= Lima metropolitan area =

Coordinates: 12.0583°S 77.0911°W

Lima Metropolitan Area
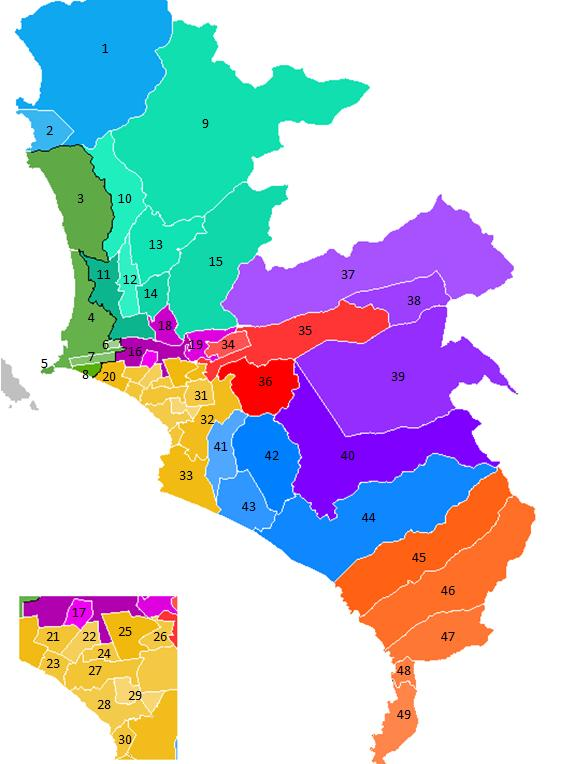
- Interactive map of Lima Metropolitan Area
- Country: Peru
- Region: Lima
- Province: Lima and Callao
- Core city: Lima

Population (estimated 2022)
  - Total: 11,804,609

GDP (nominal, 2023)
  - Metro: US$ 114 billion
  - Per capita: US$ 10,200
- Time zone: UTC-5 (PET)

The Lima Metropolitan Area (Spanish: Área Metropolitana de Lima, also known as Lima Metropolitana) is an area formed by the conurbation of the Peruvian provinces of Lima (the nation's capital) and Callao. It is the largest of the metropolitan areas of Peru, the seventh largest in the Americas, the fourth largest in Latin America, and among the thirty largest in the world. The conurbation process started to be evident in the 1980s.

The metropolitan area is composed of five subregions. These are Lima Norte, Lima Sur, Lima Este, Central Lima, and Callao. Its estimated 2020 population is over 11 million according to the INEI.

== History ==
Lima was founded by Spanish colonists on January 18, 1535. The port of Callao was founded similarly two years later (1537). The city of Lima began when Francisco Pizarro declared it at what is known in Christianity as the Epiphany. He declared it at the center of the city, the Plaza Mayor. It would become the most important city in South America.

The city of Callao has also been highly important, as for hundreds of years it was the only port in all of the Viceroyalty of Peru (all of Spanish South America at the time) allowed to ship anything to the rest of the world. For hundreds of years, Lima and Callao were separated by a desert. This did not diminish the importance of the union between the two cities. It was not until the 19th century, that they were connected by a railroad. The metropolitan linkage between these two cities did not start until they both grew enough to, in essence, crash into each other.

== Present day ==
In the present day, Lima is the most important metropolis in Peru and in the Andean region. The area's financial district is San Isidro. It is home to a large concentration of business centers, skyscrapers, and commerce. Miraflores and Barranco are two districts where the city's nightlife is mainly based in. Parts of the metropolis can be lively; music at night is common in some areas. Today different areas of the city have differing aspects and showcase variations in culture caused by varying times of settlement, differences in socio-economic level and immigration from other parts of Peru. The downtown area, unlike many downtowns in other major cities, is largely a historic district, and is home to many cathedrals and churches built during the Spanish colonial period.

In the latter half of the 20th century, the city has grown rapidly by migration from other regions of Peru. Many of these migrants began to form new communities called pueblos jovenes and asentamientos humanos, literally young towns and human settlements. These towns are similar to the favelas of Brazil, but considerably smaller. Many of them, have no running water or electricity and the city has been unable to provide the infrastructure to all the new residents. Many of the communities, such as Comas, and Villa El Salvador have evolved into modern districts, where residents have found the better life they were searching for.

== Geography ==
The conurbation has an area of 2,819.26 km^{2}. It is concentrated mainly in the coastal area and runs north–south along the Pacific coast for almost 200 km, beginning in the district of Ancón, on the border with the Huaral Province of the Lima region, and ending in the district of Pucusana, on the border with the Cañete Province, also in the Lima region. The Rímac, Chillón and Lurín rivers pass through the area. It is made up of in total 50 districts (43 of Lima Province and 7 of Constitutional Province of Callao). Most of the area is located in the desert whereas the eastern portion is located in the foothills of the Andes. It is the world's second largest desert city after Cairo, Egypt. The Lima metropolitan area is informally divided into five areas, Northern Lima, Southern Lima, Eastern Lima, Centro Lima and Callao.

== Transportation ==
Today, Lima and Callao have conurbanized to the point that only signs mark the borders. Hundreds of streets and highways link the two cities.

- Taxicabs vary in quality of service and price. Most can be simply stopped at any street, private taxi companies can be called to pick up passengers at a certain address. To improve the quality of taxis running in Lima, a new law was passed to prohibit importing used cars; thanks to this law, the city of Lima has ensured that taxis and other motorists drive increasingly new vehicles, thereby reducing smog.
- Bus

Numerous inter-urban bus companies offer transportation to other cities in Peru. Quality varies depending on the price, from luxury express buses to ill-maintained and crowded micros.

- Mass-transit systems:

El Metropolitano: The newly completed bus system called Metropolitano is an above-ground mass-transit system which traverses the north area, the north-central area, the downtown, other residential districts, the financial district, the south central area, and the Cono Sur. The system starts in Chorrillos (southern Lima) and finishes in the limit of Independencia and Comas (northern Lima). Plans for additional lines were abandoned in favor of adding complementary lines to the existing route.

Lima Metro: In 2010, the government of Alan García renewed the project of Lima Metro, starting with the construction of Line 1. It calls for the construction and implementation of 11.7 kilometres (7.3 mi) (with a total of 22.5 kilometres (14.0 mi)) of viaduct elevated of double ramp from the Atocongo Bridge to downtown Lima. The Lima Metro Line 1 is being built by a consortium made up by two engineering and construction companies. It is estimated that construction will be complete by December 2010, with remaining work the electrification of the line. Siemens Engineering has responsibility for that portion. The first part of Line 1 must be completed in June 2011 and starts daily operations in July 2011.

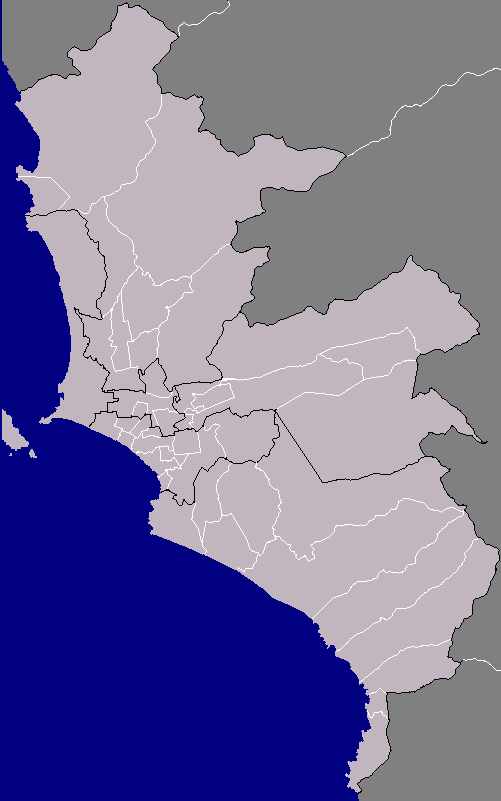
Map showing six subregions of the Lima metropolitan area

- Air transport

Lima's main passenger gateway for national and international air travelers is Jorge Chávez International Airport located in Callao (11 km. northwest from the center).

=== Population distribution ===
% of the metro area's total population, sorted by district areas:

- Lima Norte (Ancón, Carabayllo, Comas, Independencia, Los Olivos, Puente Piedra, Rimac, San Martin de Porres, Santa Rosa): 26%
- Lima Este (Ate, Cieneguilla, Chaclacayo, El Agustino, La Molina, Lurigancho-Chosica San Juan de Lurigancho, San Luis, Santa Anita): 12%
- Lima Sur (Barranco, Chorrillos, Lurín, Pachacámac, Pucusana, Punta Hermosa, Punta Negra, San Bartolo, San Juan de Miraflores, Santa María del Mar, Villa el Salvador, Villa María del Triunfo): 20%
- Central Lima (Breña, La Victoria, Lima, Lince, Pueblo Libre, San Miguel): 11%
- Residential Lima (Jesús María, Magdalena del Mar, Miraflores, San Borja, San Isidro, Santiago de Surco, Surquillo): 19%
- Callao (Bellavista, Callao District, Carmen de la Legua Reynoso, La Perla, La Punta, Ventanilla District): 12%

=== Growth of the metropolitan area ===
The following maps show how the Lima/Callao metropolitan area has grown over the years. The first map shows the population in 1535, which is the year Lima was founded, and the last map shows the population in 2006.

Population of the Lima metropolitan area (1940–2017)

Population 1940, 1961, 1972, 1981, 1993, 2007 2017

=== Future as a megacity ===
The Lima metropolitan area has become an unofficial megacity (a metropolitan area of more than ten million people) as of 2017. It was the first in the Andean States, the fourth in South America, the fifth in Latin America and the seventh in the Americas.

According to the Globalization and World Cities Research Network, Lima is currently a Beta + city, one subcategory away from being in the"Alpha" category.

== See also ==
- List of metropolitan areas of Peru
- Lima
- Callao
- Peru
- Metropolitan area
- List of Latin American cities by population
