= Cono Este =

Unofficial subregion of Lima, Peru

- Subregion
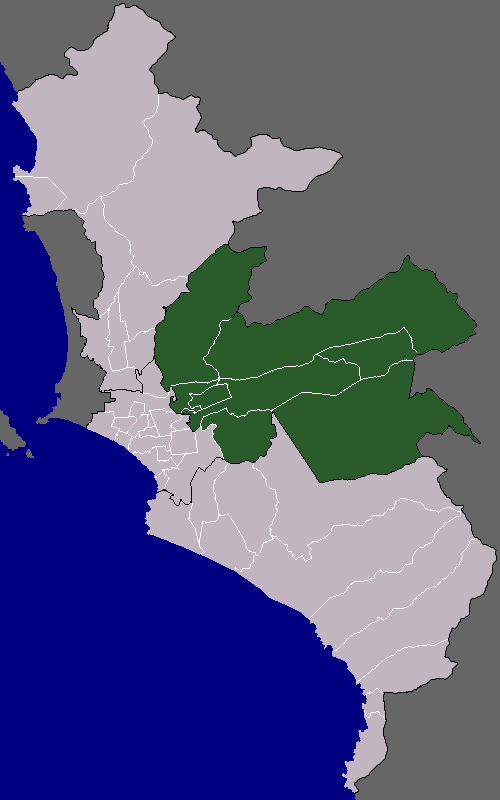
- Location of the Cono Este in Lima
- Country: Peru
- Department: Lima
- Province: Lima
- Districts: List: Ate; Chaclacayo; Cieneguilla; El Agustino; La Molina; Lurigancho; Pachacamac; San Juan de Lurigancho; Santa Anita

Area
  - Total: 620.74 km^{2} (239.67 sq mi)
- Elevation: 861 m (2,825 ft)

Population (2017)
  - Total: 1,938,187
  - Density: 3,122.4/km^{2} (8,086.9/sq mi)
- Time zone: UTC-5 (PET)

Cono Este, also known as Lima Este, is the name given to an unofficial subregion of the province of Lima, Peru. It is one of the five areas that make up Lima and Callao's metropolitan area.

Located to the east of the city, the socioeconomic levels of its residents are varied: they belong mainly to the middle class, with some areas populated by wealthier residents. During the winter, it is the only area of Lima that is not permanently covered by fog, and its most developed areas are home to retirement communities in Lurigancho-Chosica and Chaclacayo.

== Etymology ==
The term cono (lit. 'cone') was used in the mid-20th century to describe the squatted areas surrounding the city, which began to increase in number under the populist presidencies of Manuel A. Odría and Juan Velasco Alvarado. The name referred to the settlements' distance from Lima, and the word was eventually replaced by Lima, the name of the city.

== Subdivisions ==
The subregion comprises the districts of Ate, Cieneguilla, Chaclacayo, El Agustino, La Molina, Lurigancho, San Juan de Lurigancho, San Luis, and Santa Anita. Pachacamac was also once considered part of the subregion.

Santa Anita presents the highest degree of urban consolidation, while being the smallest district on the area. La Molina is a mainly residential district which gathers people of the high socioeconomic status, it also concentrates commercial activities. The least developed are those of El Agustino which is populated by slum housing, and Cieneguilla, which is mostly unurbanized. The district of Ate has to some extent undergone industrialization with several factories having been built there.

== See also ==
- Lima metropolitan area
- Judicial District of Lima
