= Cono Sur (Lima) =

Unofficial subregion of Lima, Peru

- Subregion
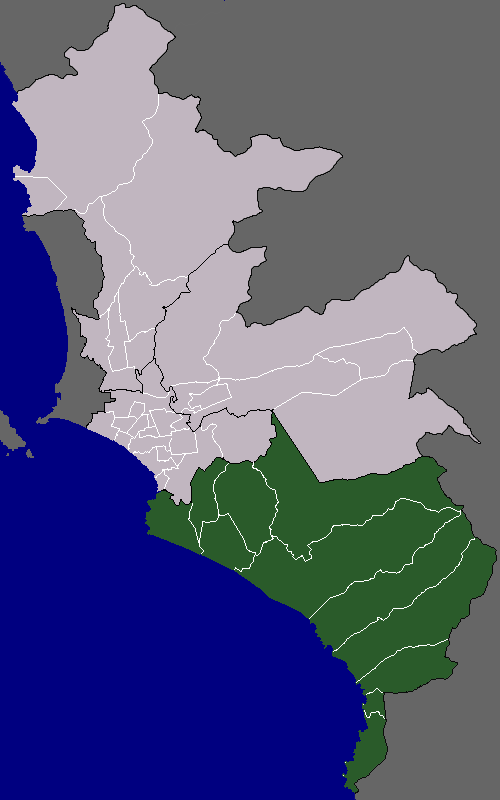
- Location of the Cono Sur in Lima
- Country: Peru
- Department: Lima
- Province: Lima
- Districts: List: Chorrillos; Lurín; Pachacamac; Pucusana; Punta Hermosa; Punta Negra; San Bartolo; San Juan de Miraflores; Santa María del Mar; Villa el Salvador; Villa María del Triunfo

Area
  - Total: 852.95 km^{2} (329.33 sq mi)
- Elevation: 175 m (574 ft)

Population (2017)
  - Total: 1,706,733
  - Density: 2,001.0/km^{2} (5,182.5/sq mi)
- Time zone: UTC-5 (PET)

Cono Sur, also known as Lima Sur, is the name given to an unofficial subregion of the province of Lima, Peru. It is one of the five areas that make up Lima and Callao's metropolitan area.

Located to the south of the city, the socioeconomic levels of its districts are varied. Most of the population however belongs to the lower and middle classes, many of which are inner-country immigrants. Many continue to live in slums known as Pueblos jóvenes. Known for its beaches, farms and factories, it is the area closest to the districts of the modern and residential areas, and its population greatly increases in the summertime.

== Etymology ==
The term cono (lit. 'cone') was used in the mid-20th century to describe the squatted areas surrounding the city, which began to increase in number under the populist presidencies of Manuel A. Odría and Juan Velasco Alvarado. The name referred to the settlements' distance from Lima, and the word was eventually replaced by Lima, the name of the city.

== Subdivisions ==
The subregion comprises the districts of Chorrillos, Lurín, Pachacamac, Pucusana, Punta Hermosa, Punta Negra, San Bartolo, San Juan de Miraflores, Santa María del Mar, Villa el Salvador, and Villa María del Triunfo.

== See also ==
- Lima metropolitan area
- Judicial District of Lima
