= List of slums in Peru =

This is a list of slums in Peru, known popularly as pueblos jóvenes.

== Lima Metropolitan Area ==
- Comas
- Villa El Salvador
- San Juan de Lurigancho
- Carabayllo
- Villa María del Triunfo
- Carmen de la Legua Reynoso
- Ventanilla
- Chosica

== Other cities ==
- Cusco
- Trujillo
- Piura
- Arequipa
- Juliaca
- Puno
- Tacna
- Iquitos
  - Belén
- Chiclayo
- Chimbote
  - Nuevo Chimbote

== See also ==
- List of slums
