= Cono Norte =

Unofficial subregion of Lima, Peru

- Subregion
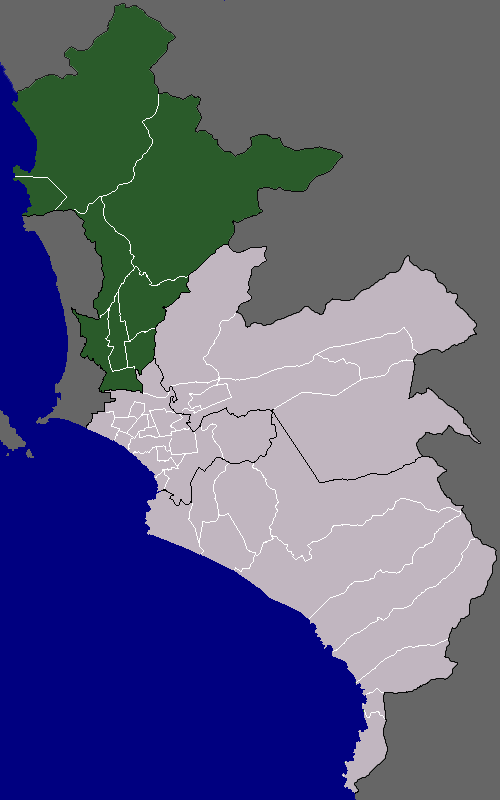
- Location of the Cono Norte in Lima
- Country: Peru
- Department: Lima
- Province: Lima
- Districts: List: Ancón; Carabayllo; Comas; Independencia; Los Olivos; Puente Piedra; Rímac; San Martín de Porres; Santa Rosa

Area
  - Total: 988.5 km^{2} (381.7 sq mi)
- Elevation: 238 m (781 ft)

Population
  - Total: 2,732,943
  - Density: 2,765/km^{2} (7,161/sq mi)
- Time zone: UTC-5 (PET)

Cono Norte, also known as Lima Norte, is the name given to an unofficial subregion of the province of Lima, Peru. It is one of the five areas that make up Lima and Callao's metropolitan area.

Located to the north of the city, the socioeconomic levels of its districts are varied: the districts of Ancón and Santa Rosa are the popular beach resorts (but not residential areas) for the city's wealthier residents. The rest of the population comprises middle and lower class residents. It is one of the most populated areas of Peru.

== Etymology ==
The term cono (lit. 'cone') was used in the mid-20th century to describe the squatted areas surrounding the city, which began to increase in number under the populist presidencies of Manuel A. Odría and Juan Velasco Alvarado. The name referred to the settlements' distance from Lima, and the word was eventually replaced by Lima, the name of the city.

== Subdivisions ==
The subregion comprises the districts of Ancón, Carabayllo, Comas, Independencia, Los Olivos, Puente Piedra, San Martín de Porres, and Santa Rosa. Rímac District was formerly part of the region, currently part of the Cono Centro.

== See also ==
- Lima metropolitan area
- Judicial District of Lima
