= Lurín District =

District in Lima, Peru

Coordinates: 12°16′45″S 76°52′30″W

Lurín
- District
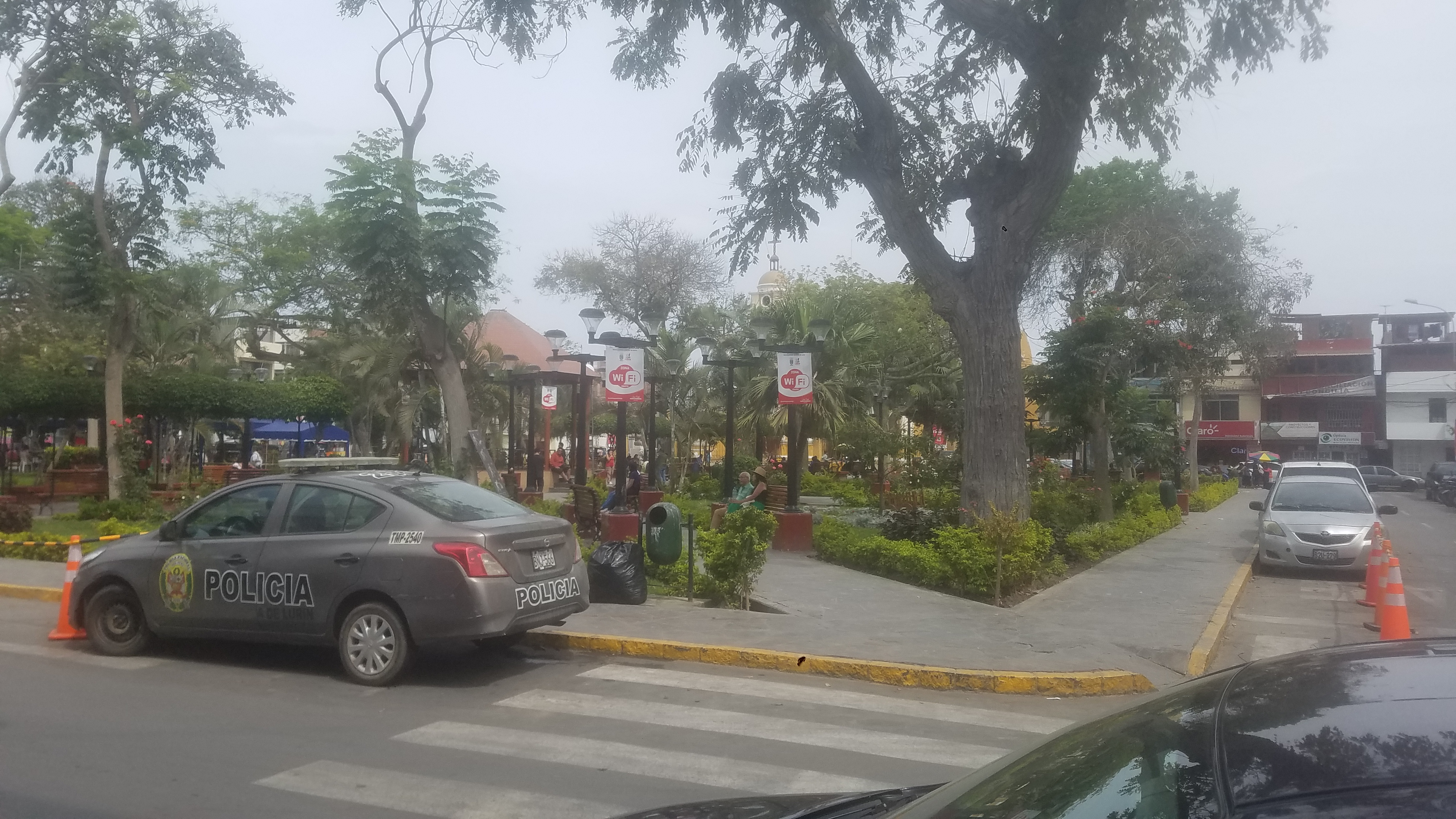

- Coat of arms

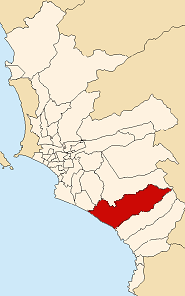
- Location of Lurín in the Lima province
- Country: Peru
- Region: Lima
- Province: Lima
- Founded: January 2, 1857
- Capital: Lurín

Government
  - Mayor: Juan Marticorena (2023–2026)

Area
  - Total: 181.12 km^{2} (69.93 sq mi)
- Elevation: 9 m (30 ft)

Population (2023)
  - Total: 115,330
  - Density: 636.76/km^{2} (1,649.2/sq mi)
- Time zone: UTC-5 (PET)
- UBIGEO: 150119
- Website: munilurin.gob.pe

Lurín is a district of the Lima Province in Peru known for its archaeological temple of Pachacámac, the Pachacámac Islands (or "La Ballena"), countryside areas, villages, fincas, rural restaurants, nightlife and beaches. The Lurín River runs through the district, one of the three valleys of the city of Lima.

== Boundaries ==
It borders on the north with the districts of Villa El Salvador, Villa María del Triunfo and Pachacámac, to the east also with the Pachacámac district, to the south with the Punta Hermosa district, and to the west with the Pacific Ocean.

== General information ==
Historically, the district was the location of the temple complex of Pachacámac.

The district was created on January 2, 1857, and since then it has been an agricultural district as it is located in the center of the Lurín River valley. It has a few beaches, which receive tourists during the summer months (December–March) principally from the city of Lima, which it is gradually being incorporated into.

This southern suburb of Lima benefits from industrial activities along the Pan-American Highway like Unique -Yanbal factory and an industrial park "Las Praderas" where important companies like Owens Illinois operate.

The district is also home to the National Museum of Peru, which opened in 2021.

== See also ==
- Administrative divisions of Peru
- Cono Sur
- Lima Metropolitan Area
