= Carabayllo District =

District in Lima, Peru

Carabayllo
- District
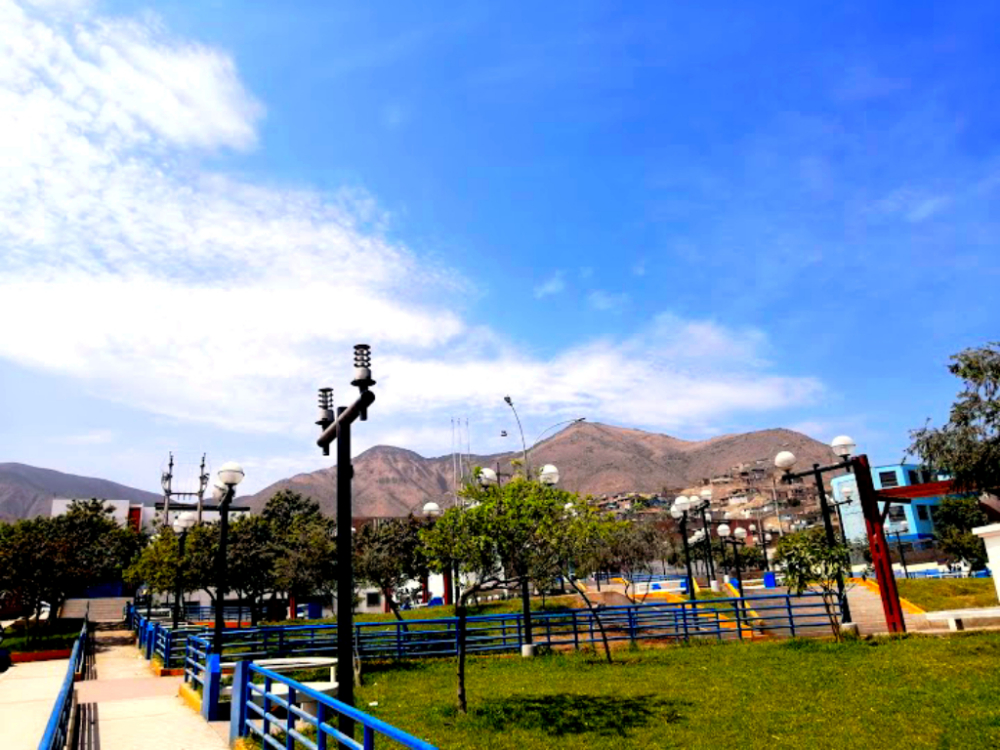

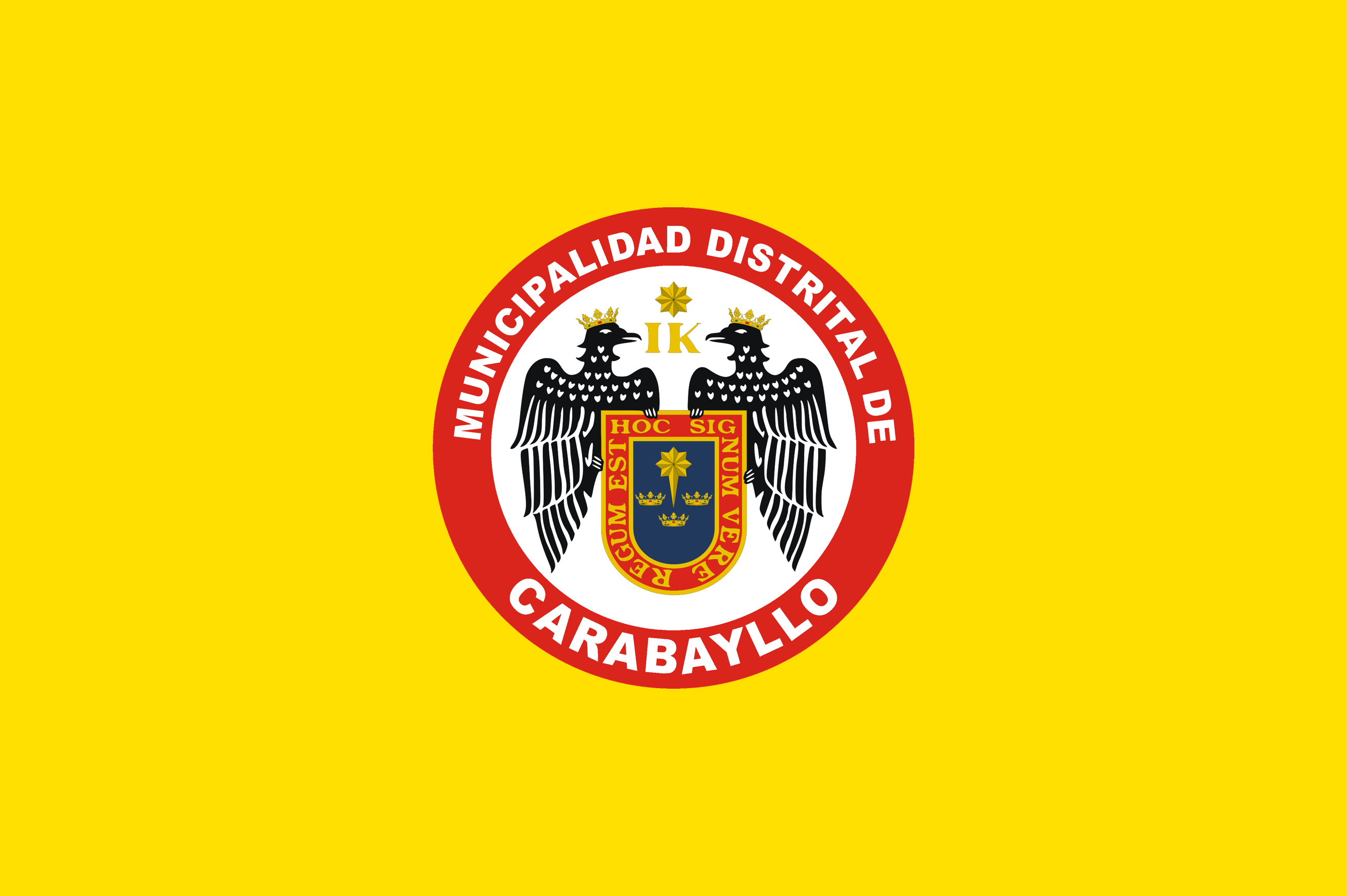
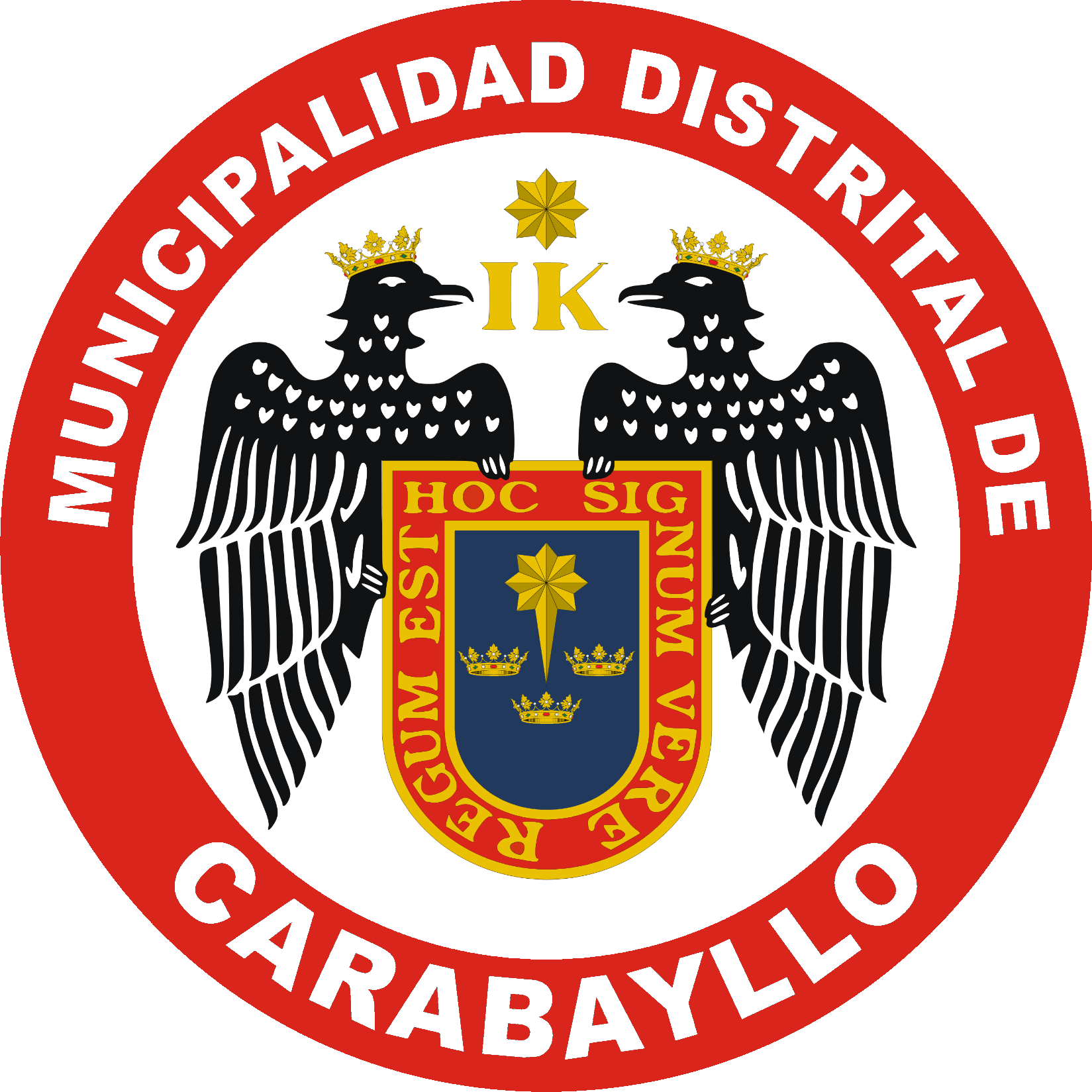
- Flag Coat of arms

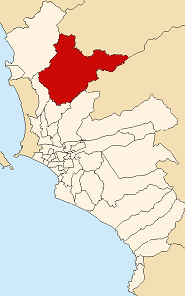
- Location of Carabayllo in the Lima province
- Coordinates: 11°51′S 77°02′W
- Country: Peru
- Region: Lima
- Province: Lima
- Created: August 4, 1821
- Capital: San Pedro de Carabayllo
- Subdivisions: 50 populated centers

Government
  - Mayor: Pablo Mendoza (2023-2026)

Area
  - Total: 346.88 km^{2} (133.93 sq mi)
- Elevation: 238 m (781 ft)

Population (2023)
  - Total: 426,985
  - Density: 1,230.9/km^{2} (3,188.1/sq mi)
- Time zone: UTC-5 (PET)
- UBIGEO: 150106
- Website: municarabayllo.gob.pe

Carabayllo (Spanish pronunciation: [kaɾaβaˈiʝo]) is a district of Lima, Peru. It is located in the Cono Norte area of the province and was created district by General José de San Martín on August 4, 1821, at which time it was the only district to occupy the area north of the Rímac River up to the province Canta.

== History ==
Carabayllo was the first district to be created by decree in the Lima Province by General José de San Martín in the independence era on August 4, 1821. At that time the district occupied the whole Chillón valley north of the Rímac River up to the Canta province. In principle, the district was the only one in the north, and included the districts of: Ancón, Santa Rosa, Puente Piedra, Ventanilla, Comas, San Martín de Porres, Independencia, Los Olivos, Santa Rosa de Quives and part of Rímac District. Through the years the district lost most of its territory to newly created districts following the growth of economic activity and the growth of the population in the area. This process started as early as 1874 when the Ancón District was created and continued to as recent as 1961 when the Comas District was created and as recent as 1969 when the Ventanilla District was founded in neighboring Callao Province. Carabayllo still remains the largest district in Lima with an area of 346 km2 and a population of about 200,000 (2005). Carabayllo is a zone of recent expansion to the city. The principal road connecting the district to the rest of the metropolis is the Tupac Amaru Avenue. It is at an altitude of 238 meters above sea level. Its social economic level is principally made up of middle and lower middle classes.

== Politics ==
Carabayllo is under the jurisdiction of its own district municipality, as well as that of the Metropolitan Municipality of Lima.

=== Subdivisions ===
Carabayllo is the site of 21 populated centres that make up the district:

| Code | Name | Region Type | Altitude (MSL) | Population (total) | Housing (total) |
|---|---|---|---|---|---|
| 0001 | Carabayllo | Chala | 238 | 328,740 (2017) | 98,884 (2017) |
| 0005 | Buenavista | Maritime Yunga | 554 | 437 (2017) | 207 (2017) |
| 0006 | Chocas Alto | Maritime Yunga | 514 | 324 (2017) | 108 (2017) |
| 0008 | Chocas Bajo | Chala | 474 | 365 (2017) | 158 (2017) |
| 0009 | Casinelli | Chala | 437 | 124 (2017) | 67 (2017) |
| 0010 | Caballero | Chala | 477 | 157 (2017) | 54 (2017) |
| 0011 | Huarangal | Chala | 408 | 99 (2017) | 58 (2017) |
| 0012 | Fray Martín | Chala | 396 | 310 (2017) | 124 (2017) |
| 0013 | Santa Rosa de Puquio | Chala | 366 | 189 (2017) | 49 (2017) |
| 0014 | Cuchicorral | Chala | 350 | 158 (2017) | 66 (2017) |
| 0022 | Cerro Cañón | Chala | 308 | 96 (2017) | 34 (2017) |
| 0033 | Olfa | Chala | 426 | 71 (2017) | 29 (2017) |
| 0034 | Río Seco | Maritime Yunga | 523 | 420 (2017) | 1,121 (2017) |
| 0035 | Paraíso | Chala | 462 | 19 (2017) | 37 (2017) |
| 0037 | El Rosario | Chala | 425 | 109 (2017) | 33 (2017) |
| 0038 | Cerro Puquio | Chala | 398 | 106 (2017) | 64 (2017) |
| 0039 | La Campana | Chala | 371 | 55 (2017) | 64 (2017) |
| 0045 | San José | Chala | 440 | 157 (2017) | 54 (2017) |
| 0055 | Carmelito | Chala | 365 | 7 (2017) | 30 (2017) |
| 0056 | Santa Elena | Chala | 372 | 0 (2017) | 1 (2017) |
| 0057 | Don Luis | Chala | 368 | 52 (2017) | 22 (2017) |
| 0064 | Santa Margarita - Molinos | Chala | 459 | 143 (2017) | 87 (2017) |
| 0065 | Sipán Perú | Chala | 490 | 69 (2017) | 34 (2017) |
| 0070 | Naranjito | Chala | 244 | 114 (2017) | 27 (2017) |
| 0086 | Los Huertos de Río Seco II Etapa | Maritime Yunga | 597 | 18 (2017) | 269 (2017) |
| 0087 | San Francisco | Chala | 461 | 100 (2017) | 105 (2017) |
| 0088 | Huatocay | Maritime Yunga | 515 | 325 (2017) | 141 (2017) |
| 0089 | El Paraíso | Maritime Yunga | 513 | 171 (2017) | 238 (2017) |
| 0090 | Loma | Chala | 455 | 6 (2017) | 3 (2017) |
| 0091 | Pirámide | Chala | 241 | 86 (2017) | 33 (2017) |
| 0092 | Remanzo | Chala | 238 | 18 (2017) | 8 (2017) |

== Geography ==
Carabayllo is bordered to the north and east by Canta Province, to the south by Comas, San Juan de Lurigancho and San Antonio de Chaclla, and to the west by Puente Piedra and Ancón districts.

=== Climate ===
Climate data for Carabayllo District (Huarangal), elevation 404 m (1,325 ft), (1991–2020)
| Month | Jan | Feb | Mar | Apr | May | Jun | Jul | Aug | Sep | Oct | Nov | Dec | Year |
|---|---|---|---|---|---|---|---|---|---|---|---|---|---|
| Mean daily maximum °C (°F) | 27.4 (81.3) | 29.2 (84.6) | 29.4 (84.9) | 27.4 (81.3) | 23.8 (74.8) | 20.2 (68.4) | 18.8 (65.8) | 19.1 (66.4) | 20.5 (68.9) | 22.3 (72.1) | 23.6 (74.5) | 25.5 (77.9) | 23.9 (75.1) |
| Mean daily minimum °C (°F) | 19.0 (66.2) | 20.1 (68.2) | 20.2 (68.4) | 18.7 (65.7) | 15.7 (60.3) | 13.8 (56.8) | 13.2 (55.8) | 12.9 (55.2) | 13.2 (55.8) | 14.0 (57.2) | 15.0 (59.0) | 16.9 (62.4) | 16.1 (60.9) |
| Average precipitation mm (inches) | 0.3 (0.01) | 2.0 (0.08) | 0.0 (0.0) | 0.2 (0.01) | 0.2 (0.01) | 1.2 (0.05) | 3.6 (0.14) | 1.8 (0.07) | 0.8 (0.03) | 0.1 (0.00) | 0.1 (0.00) | 0.0 (0.0) | 10.3 (0.4) |
Source: National Meteorology and Hydrology Service of Peru

== See also ==
- Lima
- Lima Metropolitan Area
- List of districts of Lima
- Cono Norte
- Districts of Peru
- Administrative divisions of Peru
