= Esther Festini =

Peruvian educator

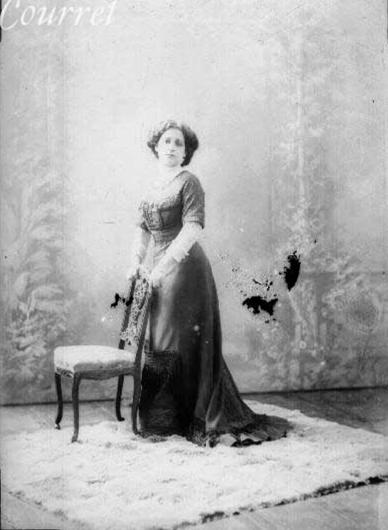

Esther Festini was a Peruvian educator. She was the first woman that went to the Universidad Nacional Mayor de San Marcos and the first one that received a Doctor of Letters.

Her effort to study education at the university was aimed at the official recognition of the Liceo Grau, a school of which she was the founder and director. She went to the UNMSM in 1898; three years later, in 1901, she graduated from high school . In 1904 she obtained the degree of Doctor from the Faculty of Philosophy and Letters thanks to her thesis, Cuestiones relativas a la educación femenina [Questions relating to female education] where she proposed a new model of public education and the need to implement schools for girls.

Upon completing 50 years of teaching activity, she was honored with a plaque in the honor yard of the Miguel Grau National School.

A street in the Lima's Magdalena del Mar District bears her name (Esther Festini de Ramos St.), as well as an educational institution in the Comas District and a secondary school in the San Martín de Porres District, both in the Peruvian capital.
