= San Bartolo District =

District in Lima, Peru

San Bartolo
- District
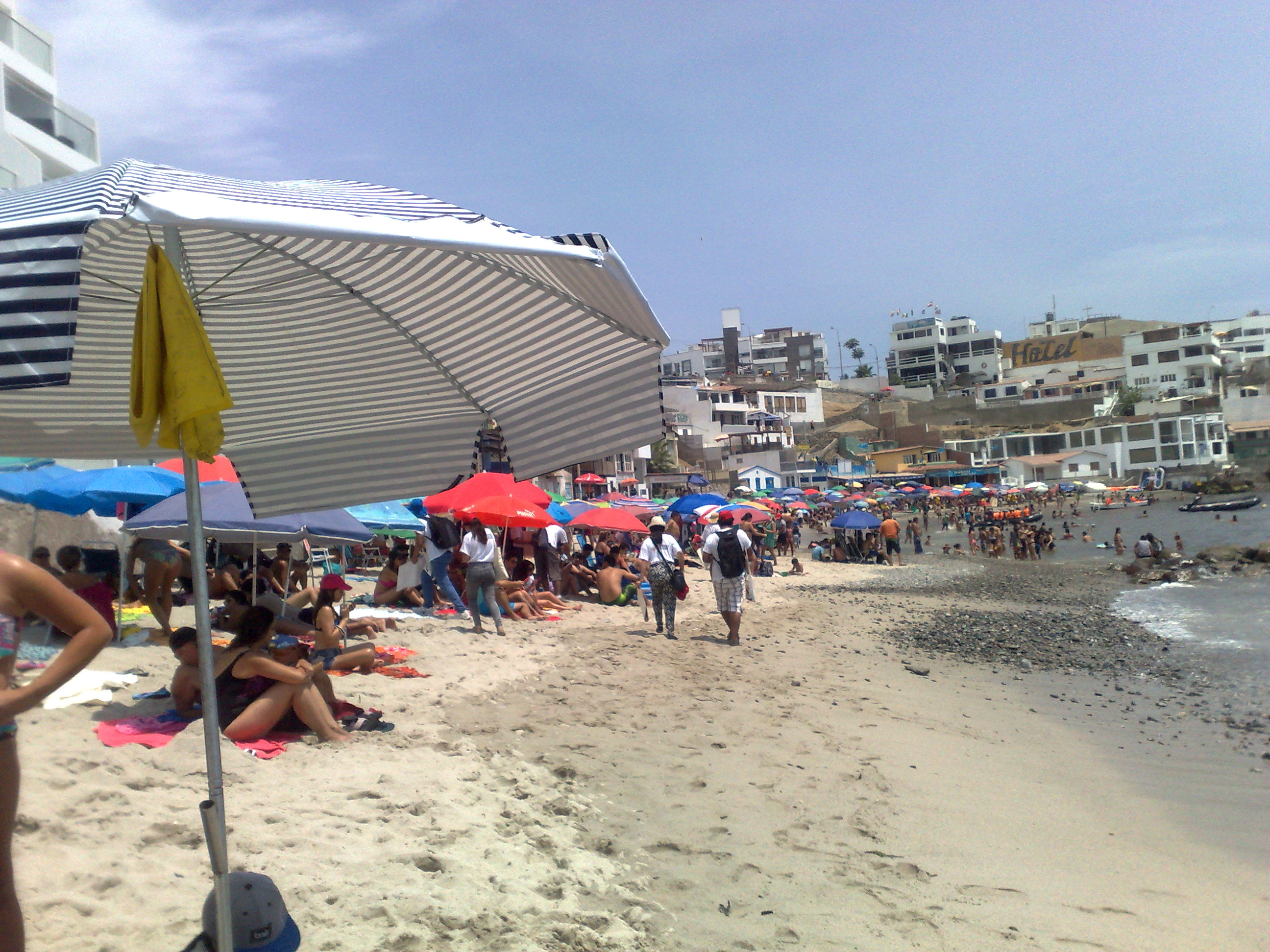
- A beach in San Bartolo

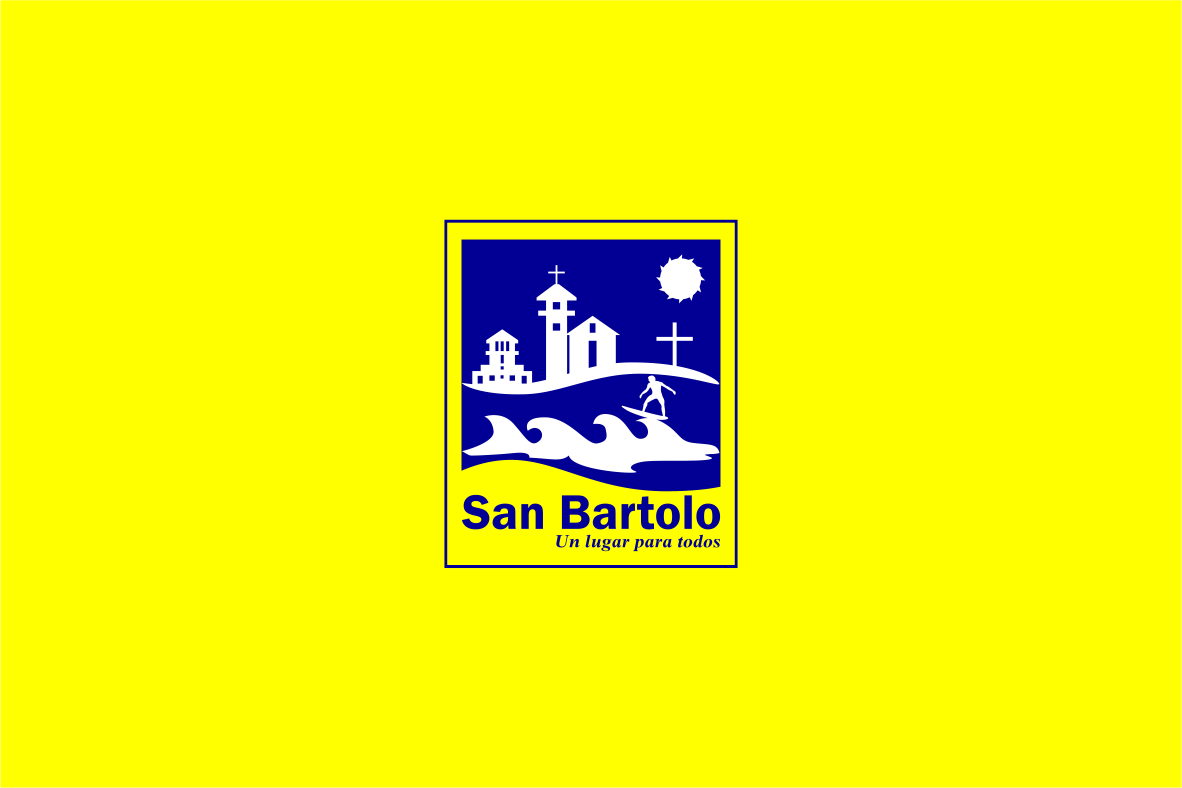
- Flag Coat of arms

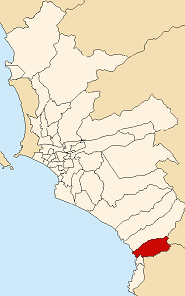
- Location of San Bartolo in the Lima province
- Coordinates: 12°25′S 76°47′W
- Country: Peru
- Province: Lima
- Founded: May 5, 1946
- Capital: San Bartolo
- Subdivisions: 18 populated centers

Government
  - Mayor: Augusto Carbajal (2023–2026)

Area
  - Total: 45.01 km^{2} (17.38 sq mi)
- Elevation: 30 m (98 ft)

Population (2023)
  - Total: 9,424
  - Density: 209.4/km^{2} (542.3/sq mi)
- Time zone: UTC-5 (PET)
- UBIGEO: 150129
- Website: munisanbartolo.gob.pe

San Bartolo is a district in southern Lima Province in Peru. It is bordered by the Pacific Ocean on the west, the district of Punta Negra on the north, the Huarochirí Province on the east, and Santa María del Mar District on the south.

It is well known for its beaches and attracts many beachgoers every summer. Many of them also rent apartments during this season, making the district's population increase considerably. San Bartolo has some restaurants and a club with a large seawater swimming pool.

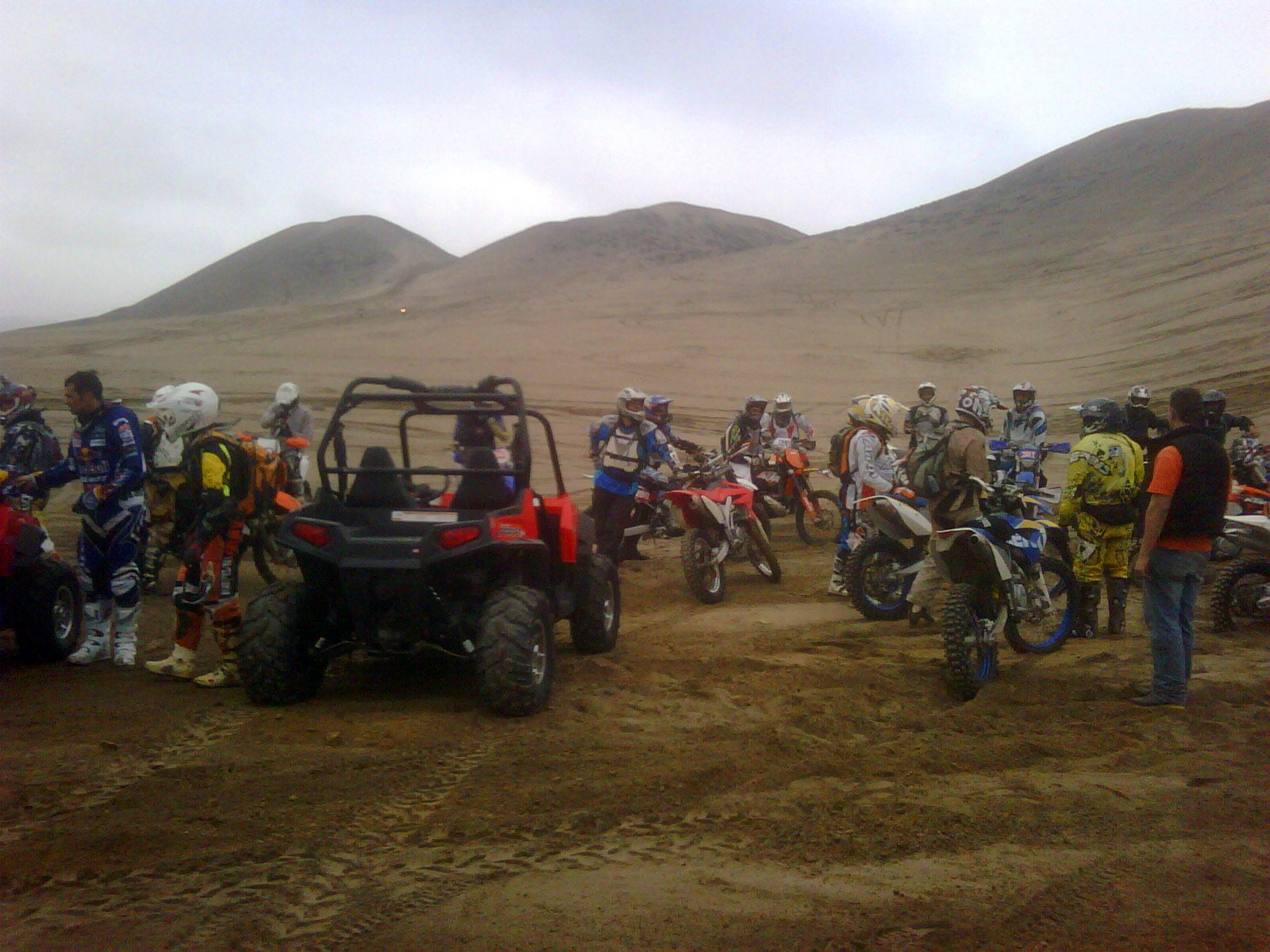
ATV and motorcycle competitions are commonplace in San Bartolo

== See also ==
- Administrative divisions of Peru
- Cono Sur
- Punta Hermosa
- Miraflores
- Chorrillos
- La Punta
- Ancón
- Asia
- Santa Rosa
