= Punta Hermosa =

District of Lima, Peru

- District
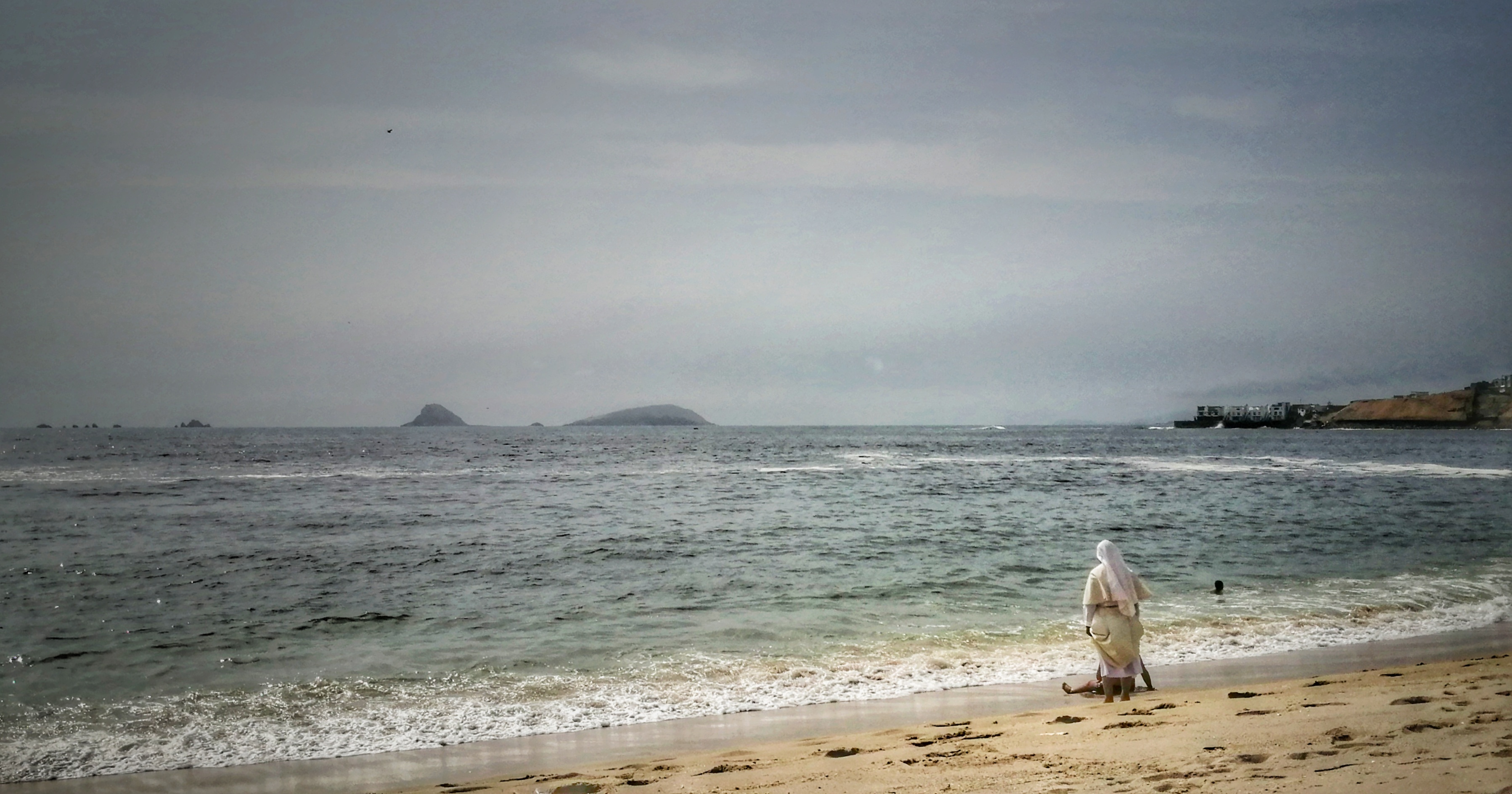
- View of El Silencio beach

- Coat of arms

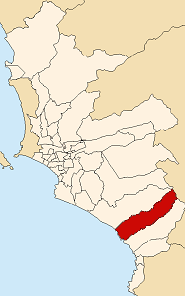
- Location of Punta Hermosa in the Lima province
- Coordinates: 12°20′S 76°49′W
- Country: Peru
- Region: Lima
- Province: Lima
- Founded: April 7, 1954
- Capital: Punta Hermosa
- Subdivisions: 4 populated centers

Government
  - Mayor: Carlos Fernández (2023–2026)

Area
  - Total: 119.5 km^{2} (46.1 sq mi)
- Elevation: 18 m (59 ft)

Population (2023)
  - Total: 23,080
  - Density: 193.1/km^{2} (500.2/sq mi)
- Time zone: UTC-5 (PET)
- UBIGEO: 150126
- Website: munipuntahermosa.gob.pe

Punta Hermosa is one of 43 districts of the Lima Province in Peru. The capital of the district is the village of Punta Hermosa. The district's main attractions are its beaches.

== Geography ==
Punta Hermosa borders the Pacific Ocean on the west; the Lurin, and Pachacámac districts on the north; Huarochirí Province's, district of Santo Domingo de los Olleros on the east; and the Punta Negra district on the south.

== Political division ==
The district is divided into 4 populated centers (Spanish: Centros Poblados):

- Punta Hermosa
- Capilla Lucumo
- Cucuya
- Pampapacta

== Beach resort ==
Punta Hermosa is located 42 km south of downtown Lima, to which it is connected by the Pan-American Highway. The district's main attraction is its beaches, which are visited by thousands of people every summer. The area, which used to be a resort/vacation district where visitors stayed only temporarily, has recently seen an urban expansion and an increase in permanent year-round residents.

== See also ==
- Administrative divisions of Peru
- Cono Sur
- Ancón District
- Santa Rosa District
