= Puente Piedra District =

District in Lima, Peru

Coordinates: 11°52′30″S 77°03′55″W

Puente Piedra
- District
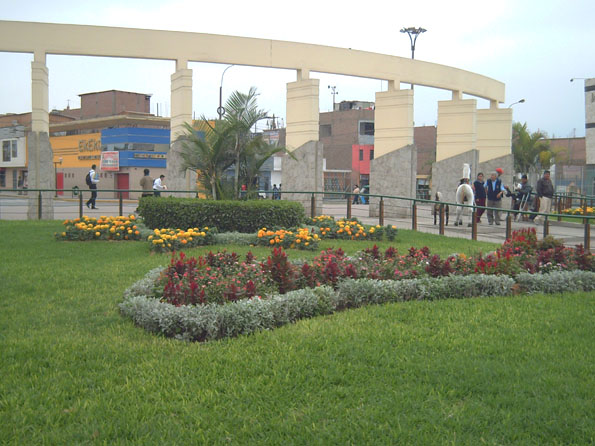

- Coat of arms

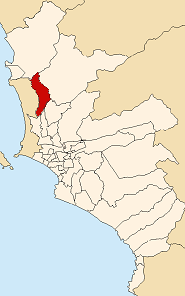
- Location of Puente Piedra in Lima
- Country: Peru
- Region: Lima
- Province: Lima
- Founded: February 14, 1927

Government
  - Mayor: Rennán Espinoza (2019–2026)

Area
  - Total: 71.18 km^{2} (27.48 sq mi)

Population (2023)
  - Total: 416,531
  - Density: 5,852/km^{2} (15,160/sq mi)
- Time zone: UTC-5 (PET)
- UBIGEO: 150125
- Website: munipuentepiedra.gob.pe

Puente Piedra is one of the 43 districts in Lima Province, Peru. It is located in the north of the city.

== History ==
In the era of the Inca Empire, in the government of Topa Inca Yupanqui, after conquering the coastal town of the Chillón River valley, he ordered the construction of bridges and roads to facilitate the passage of the Imperial Army to strengthen the expansion of Tawantinsuyu. It is in this way that a very large stone appears on the ditch that was located on the area where the district capital is located today, which at the time of the Inca era was used to cross the swamps, which allowed taking the roads through the hills to Tambo Inga and continuing to La Ensenada to cross the Chillón River by the Inca bridge.

When the Incas found out about the proximity of the Spanish, they destroyed the bridges and roads; the big stone ended up at the bottom of the ditch.

The Inca bridge of La Ensenada was rebuilt in the Viceroyalty and blown up in 1998 due to the El Niño Phenomenon.

As the swamps dried up, the dry part was covered with grass; This gave rise to Doña Francisca de Aguilar, at that time owner of Copacabana, to buy the gramadales. For those moments the famous stone continued to provide its bridge service even though the step was made from, jump to jump; because the swamps prevented the passage on the other side, for this reason, this swampy and uninhabited area took the name of "Puente Piedra" in Republican times and when the haciendas required a greater number of workers for cotton and sugar cane crops. In the year 1870, the railway from Lima to Ancón was built, and a station was built in the area, which was called "Puente Piedra Station". Around it a hamlet was formed and its agricultural inhabitants dried up the swamps and turned the grasslands into productive areas.

In 1906, the Italian Tomás Marsano appeared, asking the Peruvian government to grant the gramadales under the pretext of an irrigation project. His opponent was, at this time, Rigoberto Molina, owner of Copacabana. Marsano, for his part, insisted on claiming ownership of those lands, which were to the west of the Copacabana hacienda, despite knowing that the land had belonged to the Municipality of Lima since the viceroyalty. The inhabitants confront Tomás Marsano through a judicial process, taking refuge in the possession of the land, which with great effort they managed to put at the service of agriculture.

In 1918, Tomás Marsano legally bought the Copacabana farm and trying to take full possession, Marsano lashes out at the peaceful farmers trying to evict them or impose abusive charges. After that, the inhabitants prevented Tomás Marsano from taking possession and on January 20, 1921, they created the "Society of Puente Piedra Community Members", and later, directed by Juan Lecaros, the Community prosecuted Marsano. In 1922, during the second government of Augusto B. Leguía, the struggle achieved the most resounding triumph: the expropriation law of the Puente Piedra land was promulgated, declaring those who currently own it the owners.

The district was founded on February 14, 1927, by Law No. 5675, segregating itself from the old Carabayllo District. In this way, the Carabayllo District loses its most important homestead, the maritime strip of Ventanilla, the train station, the sugar mill and various haciendas.

Later, until the 60's, the city of Ventanilla was founded in the western part, which finally in the Revolutionary Government of the Armed Forces in 1969 created the Ventanilla District in Lima, but days after it was included within the Constitutional Province of Callao, losing more half of its initial territory.

== Economy ==
After the 'boom' of private and foreign investment in Independencia, San Martin de Porres, Los Olivos and Comas, the Puente Piedra district is now added. which is ready to be rediscovered as a social district, tourist attraction and commercial opportunity that is projected and is on its way to being one of the most developed districts of Cono Norte. In the lower part of the district there is an area full of recreation areas, swimming pools and compestres. In the center is the market area such as Huamantanga and Tres Regiones. In the Zapallal area there is a large amount of commerce as well as in the capital and the road to San Pedro de Carabayllo. The "FAMESA" fuse and explosives factory is located in the central area, which continues to operate despite the incidents in 1980 (big explosion), 1983 and 2009. And in the southern area there are also various cemeteries such as Campo Fe and Parque del Recuerdo.

== Coat of arms ==
- In the 1930s, the first coat of arms appeared that was circular in shape and contained in yellow background, the image of two clasped hands, below there are some lines that represented the Chillón River and the Ventanilla sea and on the sides the train tracks and the Pan American highway. On the edges it said: Puente de Piedras y de Amistad, and below Sobre las aguas.
- In the 1950s, a new shield appeared, which was the longest-lived, which contained the Hermes' Helmet at the top, and within it was included a representation of a sugar hacienda and the scales of justice. Lasted until 2004
- After the departure of Milton Jimenez (at that time from the Sí Cumple party), and the arrival of Rennan Espinoza (at that time from the official Peru Posible party), a new logo was created, but this time with the colors green and yellow, this shield consists of on a plant that receives the sun's rays and an image of a house with a path. After the election of Monzon and the subsequent return of Jimenez, the district takes the coat of arms of the city of Lima as its coat of arms.

== Geography ==
It has an area of 71.18 square kilometers and a population of more than 200,000.

== Boundaries ==
- North: Ancón District
- East: Carabayllo District
- South: Comas District, Los Olivos District, San Martín de Porres District
- West: Ventanilla District, Mi Peru District

== See also ==
- Administrative divisions of Peru
