= Los Olivos District =

District in Lima, Peru

Coordinates: 11°58′13″S 77°04′26″W

Los Olivos
- District
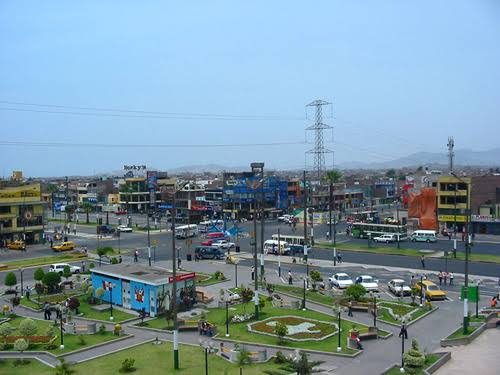

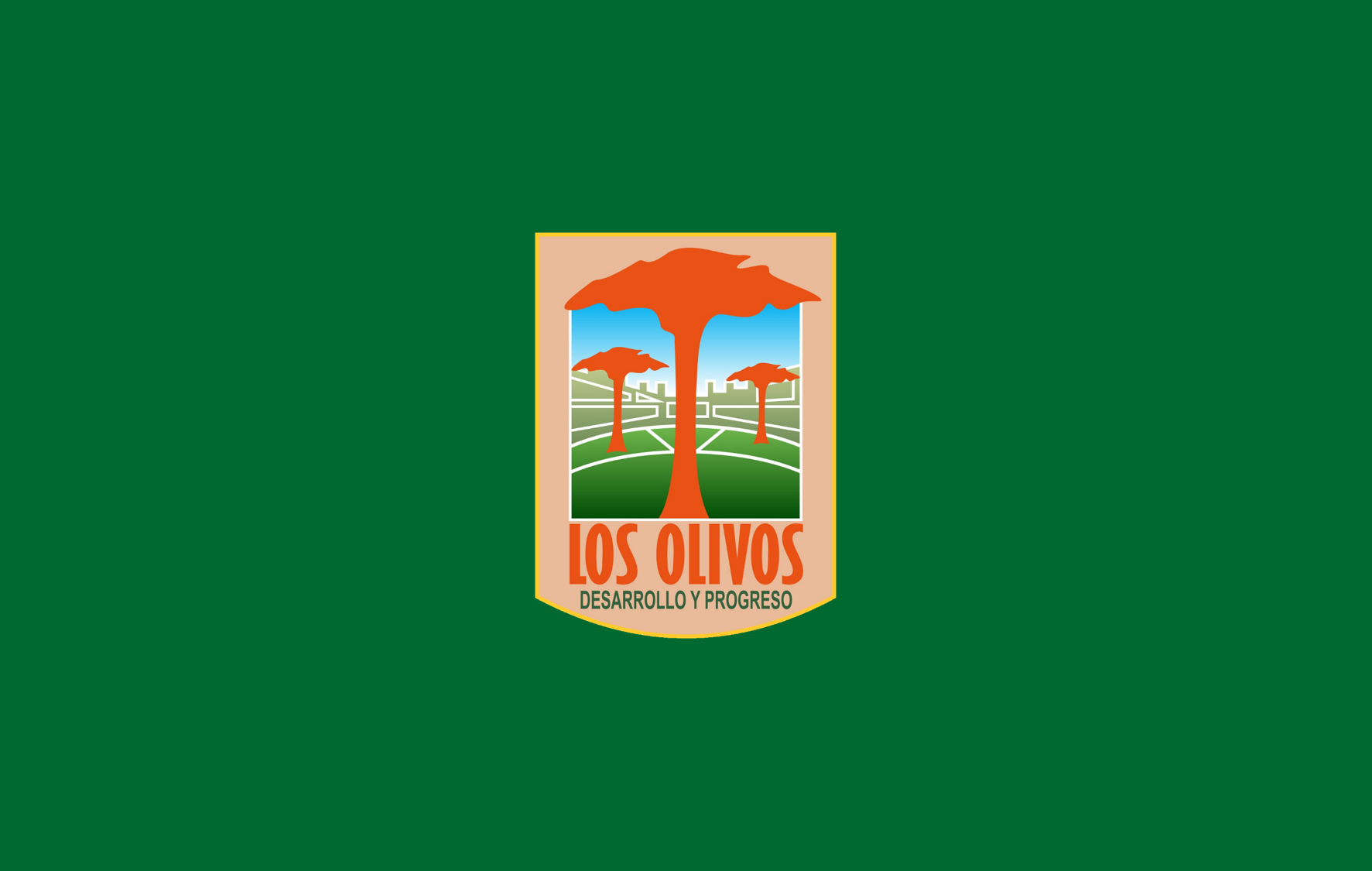
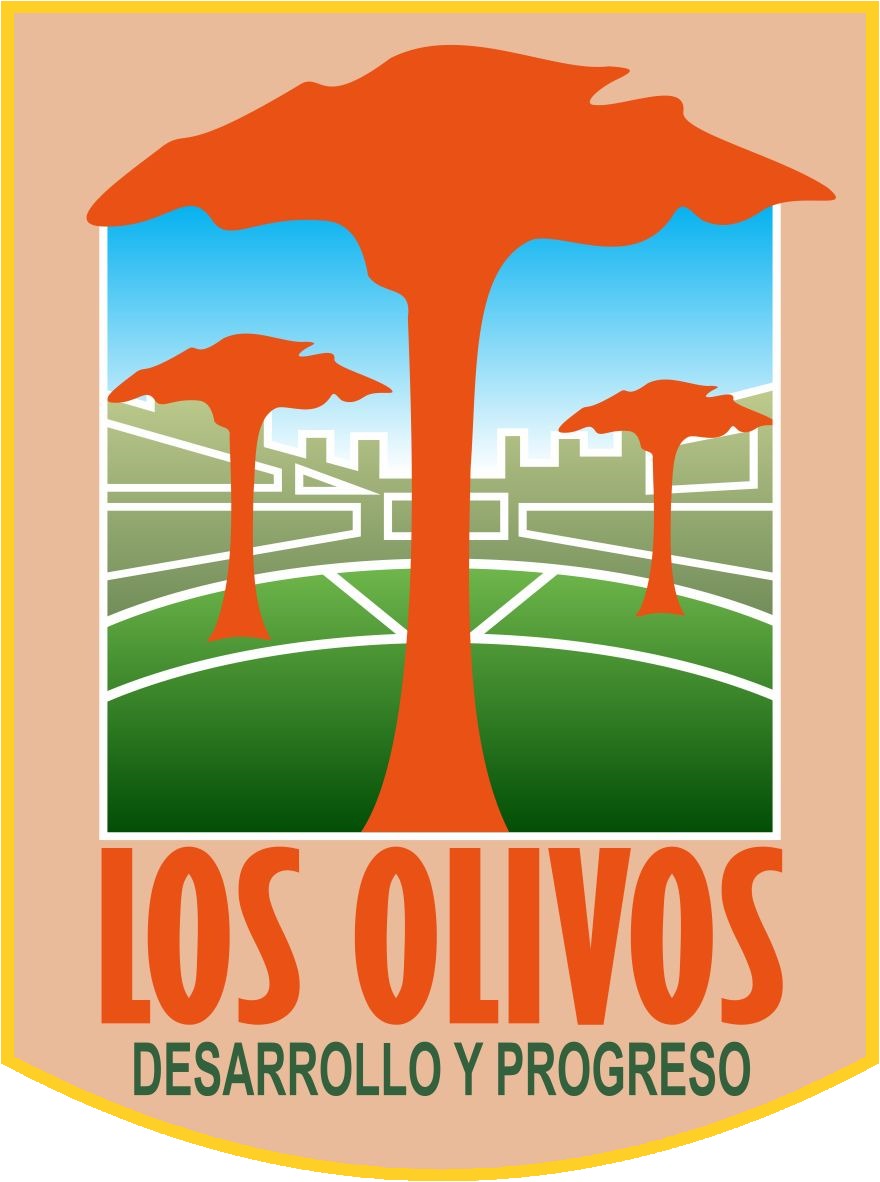
- Flag Coat of arms

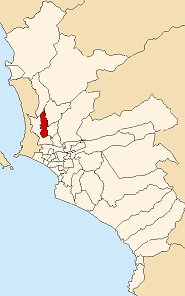
- Location of Los Olivos in Lima
- Country: Peru
- Region: Lima
- Province: Lima
- Founded: April 6, 1989
- Capital: Las Palmeras
- Subdivisions: 1 populated center

Government
  - Mayor: Felipe Castillo Oliva (2023–2026)

Area
  - Total: 18.25 km^{2} (7.05 sq mi)
- Elevation: 75 m (246 ft)

Population (2023)
  - Total: 366,371
  - Density: 20,080/km^{2} (51,990/sq mi)
- Time zone: UTC-5 (PET)
- UBIGEO: 150117
- Website: munilosolivos.gob.pe

Los Olivos is a district of the Lima Province in Peru, in the Cono Norte area in the city of Lima.

== History ==
In the Viceroyalty and early years of the republic, it was part of the great territory of Carabayllo.

In the mid-16th century, when the encomienda system failed, the Lima Cabildo granted land to Nicolás de Ribera in the Chillón Valley and to Francisco de Ampuero in Chuquitanta. By the 17th century, near these properties, the haciendas of El Naranjal, Pro, Infantas, and Aznapuquio were established.

The first efforts to create a new district date back to 1970, when a group of neighbors from El Trébol and Sol de Oro Urbanization came together to form the " Rosa de América" Management Committee. On February 4, 1977, a new committee with greater scope was created.

The district was officially established on April 6, 1989, when it separated from San Martín de Porres.

The main reason for the separation was the abandonment of these residential developments by the Municipality of San Martín de Porres.

== Geography ==
The district has a total land area of 18.25 km^{2}. Its administrative center is located 75 meters above sea level.

=== Boundaries ===
- North: Puente Piedra
- East: Comas and Independencia
- South and West: San Martín de Porres

=== Mayors ===
- 2023–2026: Luis Felipe Castillo Oliva (PP)
- 2019–2022: Felipe Baldomero Castillo Alfaro (SU)
- 2015–2018: Pedro Moises del Rosario Ramírez (PP)
- 2011–2014: Felipe Baldomero Castillo Alfaro (SU)
- 2007–2010: Felipe Baldomero Castillo Alfaro (SU)
- 2003–2006: Felipe Baldomero Castillo Alfaro (SU)
- 1999–2002: Felipe Baldomero Castillo Alfaro (VV)
- 1996–1998: Felipe Baldomero Castillo Alfaro (C90-NM)
- 1993–1995: Jesus Reynaldo Martínez Aliaga † (OBRAS)
- 1990–1992: María del Carmen Lezama Olano † (FREDEMO-AP)

== Demographics ==
According to a 2002 estimate by the INEI, the district has 301,226 inhabitants and a population density of 16,505.5 persons/km^{2}. In 1999, there were 53,660 households in the district. Most people living in this district belong to the new middle class.

Most of the heads of households in the district are immigrants, coming predominantly from the north of the country, where those from the regions of Ancash, Cajamarca, La Libertad, Piura and Lambayeque stand out, with those from the first department being more numerous. Many of these immigrants come from the little bourgeoisie.

== Economy ==
Los Olivos is considered by some media as the best developed district of Cono Norte of Lima, due to the large number of services found in the district and the high quality of life (HDI) of the district, in addition to those provided due to the proximity of the large stores and shopping centers of the Independencia and Comas Districts.

== Education ==
=== Universities ===
- Catholic University Sedes Sapientiae (UCSS)
- César Vallejo University
- Private University of the North
- Telesup University
- Technological University of Peru (UTP)
- University of Sciences and Humanities (UCH)

== 2020 stampede ==
On 22 August 2020 thirteen people were killed in a while trying to flee an illegal nightclub party in Peru raided by police on Saturday night, officials said. There were approximately 120 people at the Thomas Restobar nightclub in Los Olivos, just north of Lima, when police arrived to the scene. Neighbors had alerted police about the event. Partygoers, upon police arrival, rushed to escape through a single door, according to a statement from the Peru Interior Ministry. No tear gas or weapons were fired.
