= List of Latin American cities by population =

This is a list of the fifty largest cities in Latin America by population residing within city limits as of the mid-2020, the most recent year for which official population census results, estimate or short-term projections are available for most of these cities. These figures do not reflect the population of the urban agglomeration or metropolitan area which typically do not coincide with the administrative boundaries of the city. These figures refer to mid-2020 populations with the following exceptions:

1. Mexican cities, whose figures derive from the 2015 Intercensal Survey conducted by INEGI with a reference date of March 15, 2020;
2. Chilean cities, whose figures derive from the 2017 Census projection by Instituto Nacional de Estadísticas;
3. Venezuelan cities, whose figures originate from the 2015 estimate given by the Instituto Nacional de Estadística, with a reference date of 2016.

| | City | Image | Country | Population | Year |
|---|---|---|---|---|---|
| 1 | São Paulo | | Brazil | 11,911,337 | 2026 |
| 2 | Lima | | Peru | 10,092,000 (Note: While there is no official administrative definition of the city, it is generally considered to consist of the central 30 of the 43 districts of Lima Province, corresponding to whole metropolitan area.) | 2023 |
| 3 | Mexico City | | Mexico | 9,209,944 (Note: Population estimate is that of the federal entity known since 2016 as Ciudad de México and previously as the Distrito Federal.) | 2021 |
| 4 | Bogotá | | Colombia | 7,862,277 (Note: Population projections for Colombian cities are that of the cabecera municipal (municipal seat).) | 2024 |
| 5 | Rio de Janeiro | | Brazil | 6,731,133 | 2026 |
| 6 | Santiago | | Chile | 6,254,314 (Note: The population of Santiago was calculated using the microdata base from the 2017 Chilean census. The blocks associated with the following urban areas were considered: all of Santiago Province (except Ciudad del Valle, El Cambucho, El Maitén, Lo Aguirre, and Noviciado Alto), Puente Alto, Pirque, La Obra-Las Vertientes, Las Canteras, Chamisero, Estación Colina, Valle Grande, Chicauma, San Bernardo, Padre Hurtado, and Peñaflor. Also included are unassigned blocks from the municipalities of Santiago Province, San Bernardo, Puente Alto, Padre Hurtado, and Peñaflor..) | 2017 |
| 7 | Caracas | | Venezuela | 3,289,886 (Note: Population projection is that of the Metropolitan District of Caracas, which comprises the municipalities of Libertador, Chacao, Baruta, Sucre and El Hatillo.) | 2015 |
| 8 | Buenos Aires | | Argentina | 3,121,707 | 2022 |
| 9 | Brasília | | Brazil | 3,009,996 | 2026 |
| 10 | Medellín | | Colombia | 2,657,772 | 2024 |
| 11 | Guayaquil | | Ecuador | 2,650,288 | 2022 |
| 12 | Fortaleza | | Brazil | 2,582,360 | 2026 |
| 13 | Salvador | | Brazil | 2,559,945 | 2026 |
| 14 | Belo Horizonte | | Brazil | 2,415.451 | 2026 |
| 15 | Manaus | | Brazil | 2,327,101 | 2026 |
| 16 | Cali | | Colombia | 2,270,293 | 2024 |
| 17 | Havana | | Cuba | 2,137,847 | 2022 |
| 18 | Curitiba | | Brazil | 1,832,183 | 2026 |
| 19 | Tijuana | | Mexico | 1,810,645 (Note: Population estimate is that of the cabecera municipal (municipal seat).) | 2020 (Note: Population estimate has a reference date of 2023.) |
| 20 | Quito | | Ecuador | 1,763,275 | 2022 |
| 21 | Maracaibo | | Venezuela | 1,653,211 | 2015 |
| 22 | Ecatepec de Morelos | | Mexico | 1,643,623 (Note: Population estimate is that of the entire municipio.) | 2020 |
| 23 | Santa Cruz de la Sierra | | Bolivia | 1,606,671 | 2024 |
| 24 | Recife | | Brazil | 1,588,983 | 2026 |
| 25 | León | | Mexico | 1,579,803 | 2020 |
| 26 | Puebla | | Mexico | 1,542,232 | 2020 |
| 27 | Goiânia | | Brazil | 1,511,709 | 2026 |
| 28 | Córdoba | | Argentina | 1,505,250 | 2022 |
| 29 | Juárez | | Mexico | 1,501,551 | 2020 |
| 31 | Zapopan | | Mexico | 1,476,491 | 2020 |
| 32 | Belém | | Brazil | 1,396,157 | 2026 |
| 30 | Porto Alegre | | Brazil | 1,388,791 | 2026 |
| 33 | Guadalajara | | Mexico | 1,385,621 | 2020 |
| 34 | Guarulhos | | Brazil | 1,351,284 | 2026 |
| 35 | Rosario | | Argentina | 1,348,725 | 2022 |
| 36 | Barranquilla | | Colombia | 1,341,160 | 2024 |
| 37 | Montevideo | | Uruguay | 1,302,954 | 2023 |
| 38 | Guatemala City | | Guatemala | 1,221,739 | 2023 |
| 39 | Campinas | | Brazil | 1,189,761 | 2026 |
| 40 | Callao | | Peru | 1,171,400 | 2023 |
| 41 | Monterrey | | Mexico | 1,142,952 | 2020 |
| 42 | Tegucigalpa | | Honduras | 1,132,000 | 2023 |
| 43 | Barquisimeto | | Venezuela | 1,116,182 | 2015 |
| 44 | São Luís | | Brazil | 1,090,229 | 2026 |
| 45 | Panama City | | Panama | 1,086,990 | 2023 |
| 46 | Nezahualcóyotl | | Mexico | 1,072,676 | 2020 |
| 47 | Managua | | Nicaragua | 1,051,236 | 2022 |
| 48 | Santo Domingo | | Dominican Republic | 1,029,110 | 2022 |
| 49 | Maceió | | Brazil | 995,134 | 2026 |
| 50 | São Gonçalo | | Brazil | 959,977 | 2026 |
