= Municipalities of Peru =

Governments in the provinces and districts of Peru

Municipalities, in Peru, are the government organizations that govern the provinces and districts of that country.

== Classification ==
According to the Base law of Municipalities, these entities are classified in to Provincial Municipalities and District Municipalities. The provincial municipalities also have functions pertaining to the provincial seat which is the capital district. Rural municipalities (those whose seat has an urban population less than 50% the total) receive different classification.

== Structure ==
They are composed of two entities, the council and the mayor. The council, made up of the mayor and elected officials, is normative and. The mayor's office however, is the executive power.

== Election of authorities ==
The election of the mayor and council is held by universal suffrage for a period of three years. The number of council members is defined by the National Jury of Elections according to Laws of Municipal Elections.

== History ==
On August 9, 1873, the government of Peru passed the Organic Law of Municipalities (Spanish: Ley Orgánica de Municipalidades).

The actual law dates back to 2003.
