= Squatting in Peru =

Occupation of unused land or derelict buildings in Peru

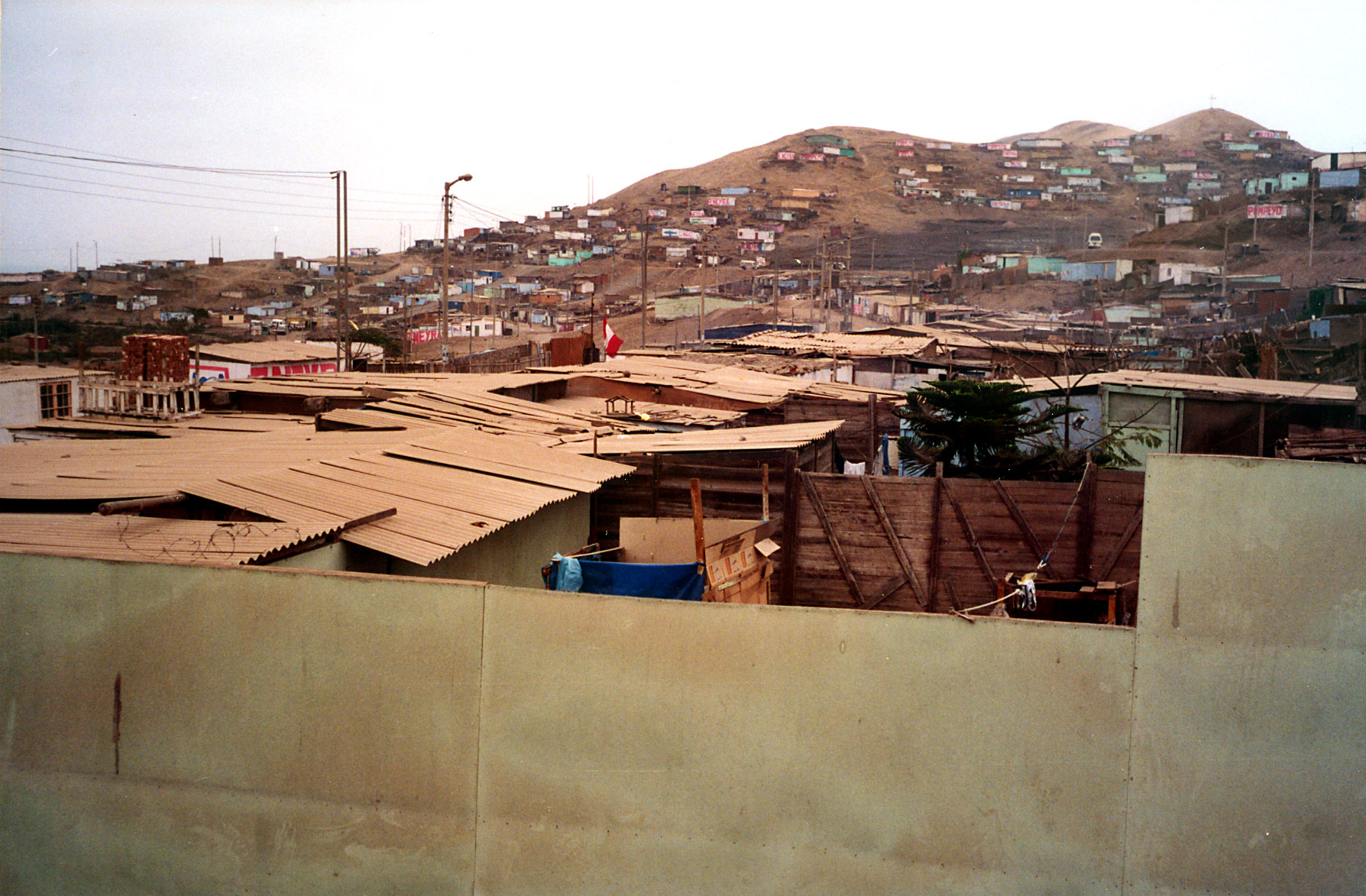
A pueblo jóven in 1997

Squatting in Peru (known in Spanish as okupa) is the occupation of unused or derelict buildings or land without the permission of the owner. From the 1940s onwards, Peru saw the illegal occupations of empty land, which created shanty towns known as barriadas and later pueblos jóvenes. Initially repressed, the Peruvian government eventually decided upon their toleration, and by 1998, it was estimated that 2.5 million inhabitants of Lima lived in such types of settlements. Similar slum tenements existed in the centre, known as solares or tugurios.

In upper-class districts of the city, a number of barriers (known by critics as the "walls of shame") have been built to separate the upper-class from lower-class areas of the city. During the COVID-19 pandemic, an increase in the occupation of land belonging to protected UNESCO World Heritage Sites, such as Caral and the Nazca Lines, was also reported.

== History ==
=== Early history ===
Squatting in Peru follows the trajectory of other Latin American cities, in that factors such as internal migration to urban areas, lack of affordable housing and ineffective governance have resulted in large informal settlements. Peruvian law states that squatters on both public and private land cannot be evicted if they have stayed there for over 24 hours. Instead, they can apply for legal title at court and if the land has not been developed over the previous decade, they can expect to win the case.

From the 1940s onwards, groups of families made land invasions to acquire homes and were often evicted forcibly, until government policy gradually changed to toleration. Many haciendas (large farms) were squatted in the 1950s by mestizo peasants and most occupations were tolerated. These mostly squatted settlements known as barriadas made up 4 per cent of new homes in 1940 and nearly 70 per cent in 1985. The rapid growth of the capital Lima is shown by estimates of the squatter population being 5,000 in 1942, 130,000 in 1958, 338,000 in 1962 and 500,000 in 1966. By the 2000s, the shanty towns were known as pueblos jóvenes ("young towns") and housed an estimated 35 per cent of the population of Lima. Most pueblos jóvenes are however assisted by the city authorities which try to provide infrastructure; others arise spontaneously as squats and a smaller proportion are built on land bought by cooperatives. By 1998, almost 2.5 million inhabitants of Lima lived in pueblos jóvenes, out of a total population of over 6.8 million. The term tugurio refers to the separate phenomenon of urban slum tenements, although residents prefer the official term solares. Around 25 per cent of Lima's population lives in these dilapidated tenement blocks.

=== Internal conflict ===
As part of the internal conflict in Peru, the Shining Path have used squatting as a tactic to gain support. On 28 July 1990, to coincide with Peruvian Independence Day, the Shining Path led an occupation in Ate-Vitarte, a district of Lima. The site was then named Raucana after Félix Raucana, one of two people who died in clashes with the police. A planned eviction in 1991 was called off after the Shining Path bombed a factory belonging to the owner.

=== 21st century ===
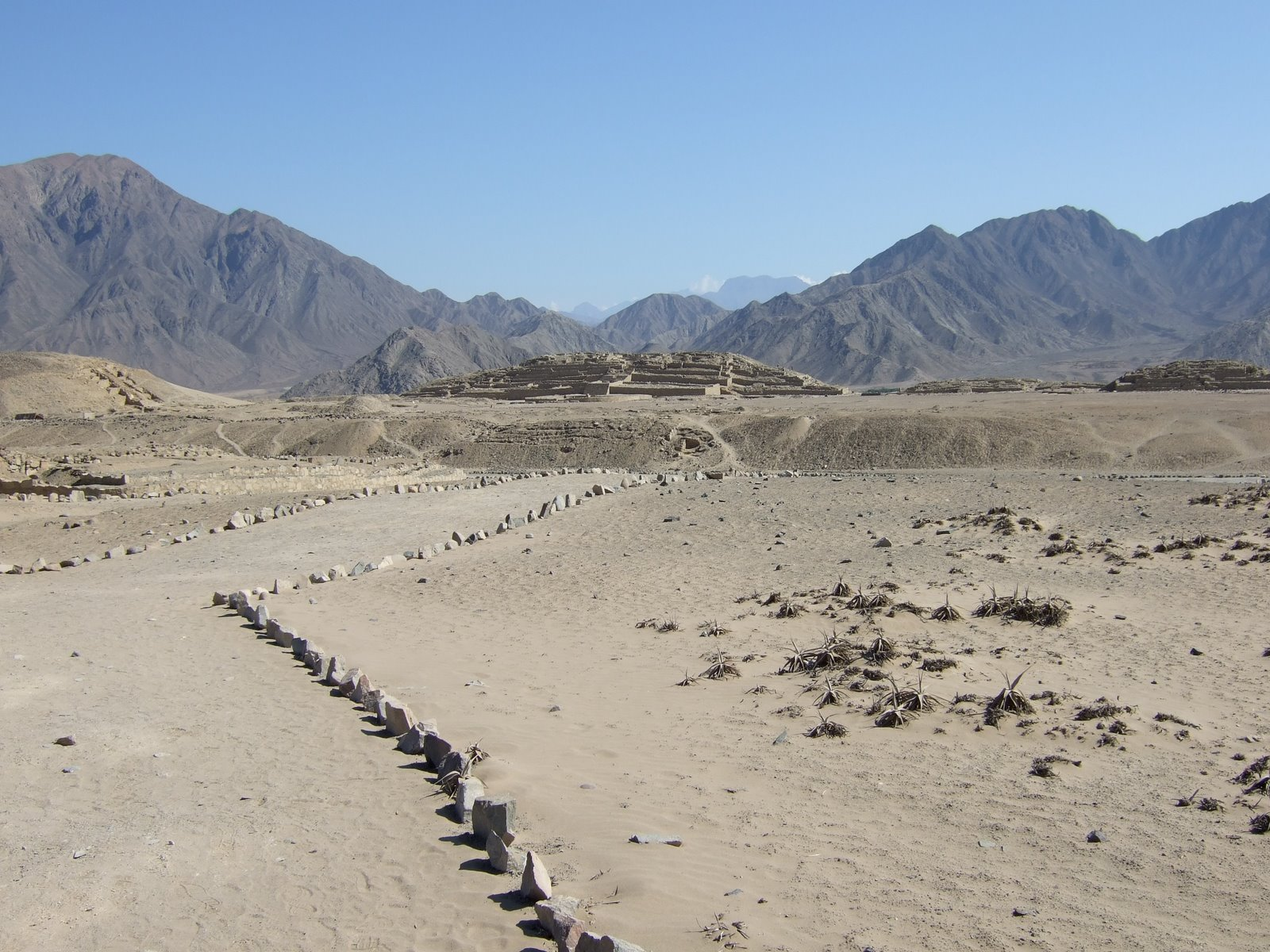
The ancient city of Caral, photographed in 2008 and occupied during the 2020 pandemic

During the COVID-19 pandemic, a national lockdown was announced. Squatters took advantage of the lessened security presence to move onto an archaeological investigation at Caral, an ancient city developed between 3,000 and 1,800 BC, which was made a UNESCO World Heritage Site in 2009. The occupiers planted trees and beans, and after being asked to leave sent death threats to archaeologist Ruth Shady. Squatters also encroached on another heritage site, the Nazca Lines. Officials from the Ministry of Culture alleged that the shacks constructed by squatters had destroyed an ancient cemetery.

The United Front of the Peoples of Peru (Frente Unitario de los Pueblos del Perú; FUPP) represents inhabitants of informal settlements and has its headquarters at Villa El Salvador.

== The "Wall of Shame" ==
From the 1980s onwards, a wall was built in Lima to separate rich settlements such as La Molina and Santiago de Surco from Pueblos jóvenes such as San Juan de Miraflores and Villa María del Triunfo. It became known as the Wall of Shame (Muro de la Vergüenza) by detractors and by 2019 was ten kilometres (6.2 mi) long. The wall means that people who work service jobs in affluent areas must commute for several hours to work. The informal settlement Villa El Salvador was squatted in 1971 and quickly grew to have a population of 25,000. By 2008, its population was 350,000 and many squatters had title to their land, although all expansion of the site continues to be illegal.
