= Cieneguilla =

District in Lima, Peru

Coordinates: 12°05′30″S 76°46′30″W

- District
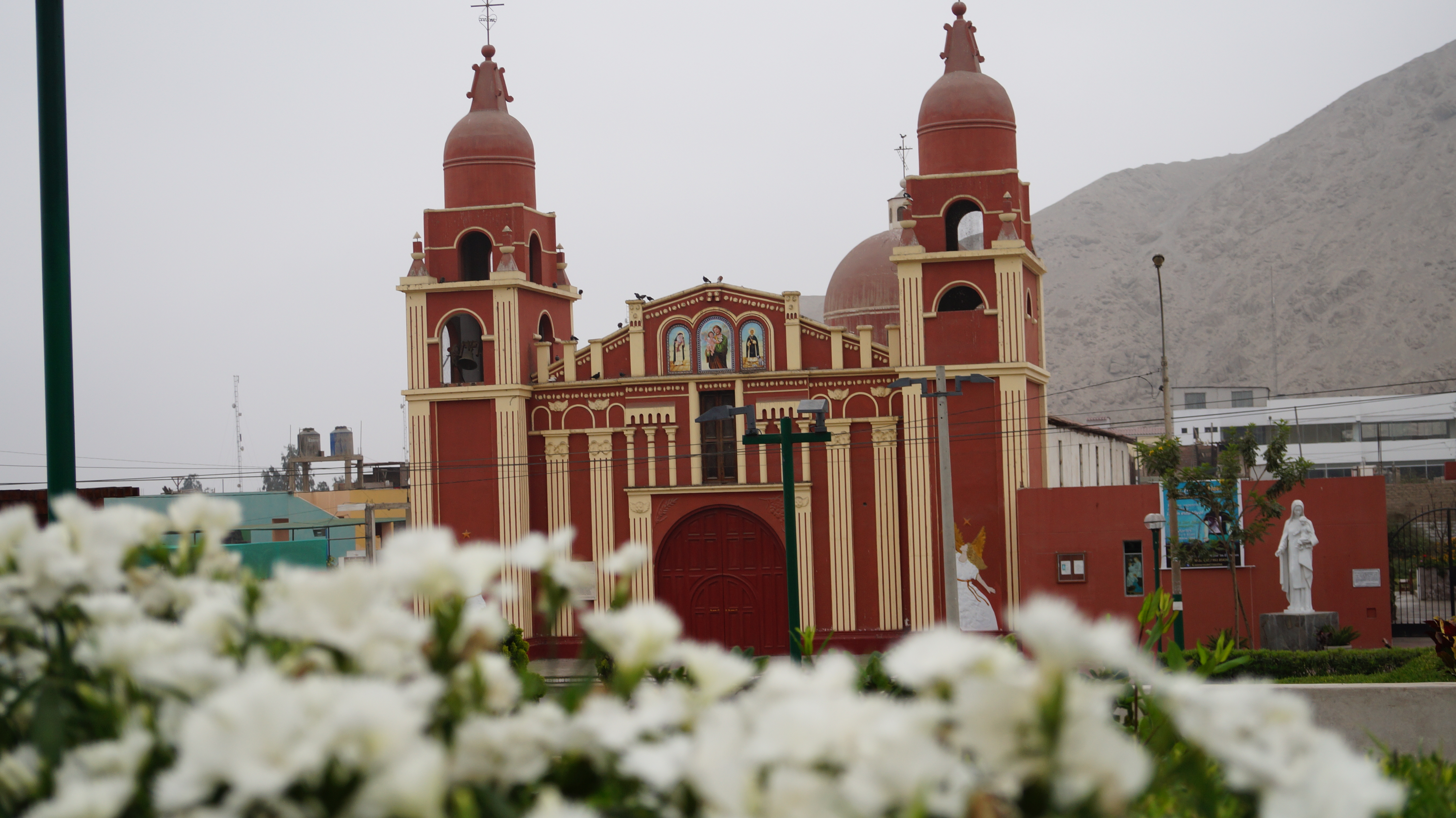
- The church of Cieneguilla

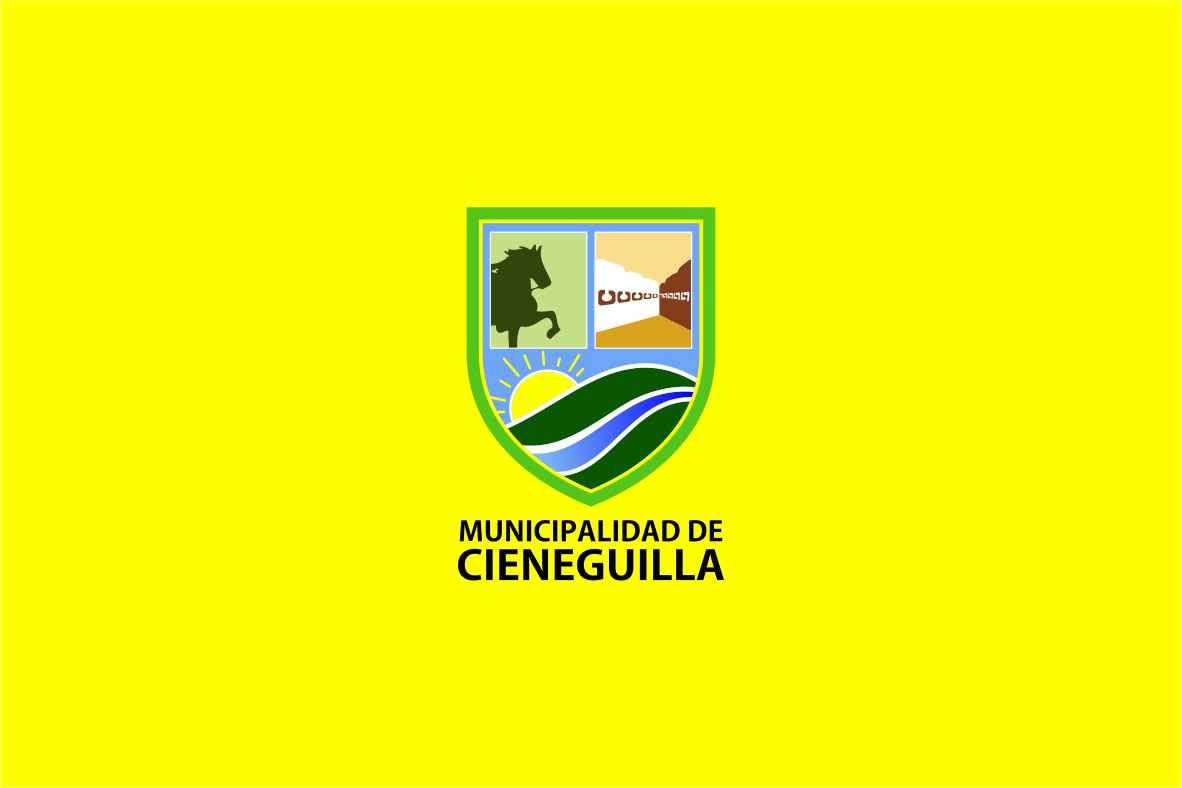
- Flag Coat of arms

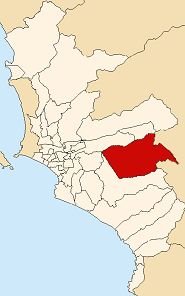
- Location of Cieneguilla in the Lima province
- Country: Peru
- Region: Lima
- Province: Lima
- Founded: March 3, 1970
- Capital: Cieneguilla

Government
  - Mayor: Emilio Chávez (2023-2026)

Area
  - Total: 240.33 km^{2} (92.79 sq mi)
- Elevation: 300 m (980 ft)

Population (2023)
  - Total: 40,683
  - Density: 169.28/km^{2} (438.43/sq mi)
- Time zone: UTC-5 (PET)
- UBIGEO: 150109
- Website: municieneguilla.gob.pe

Cieneguilla is one of the 43 districts that make up the Lima Province. It is located in the easternmost area of the province and is one of the few districts left that is not already completely urbanized.

== Boundaries ==
It borders on the east with the Huarochirí Province in the Lima Region, to the south and west with the Pachacámac District, to the north with the Ate and Chaclacayo districts.

== General ==
The main access route is a highway emanating from La Molina District. The district, founded by its first Mayor, Mr. Otakar Lukac, is found in the Lurín River valley. In this river, until the 1980s, a large amount of shrimp could be found. The Lurín River valley is the only one of the three valleys of Lima (Rimac River valley - Chillón River valley — Lurín River valley, that has not been devastated by the unregulated and unplanned urban growth of Lima. In this sense, the valley in general and Cienguilla, in particular, still have wild areas, nature, and many more attractive landscapes.

== Unique Points of Interest ==
Cieneguilla is the headquarters of Posada de Amor, a Christian children's home.

Cieneguilla is also the home of Villa Corazón de Buda, a Buddhist temple which serves practicing Buddhists in Greater Lima.

== Climate ==
Climate data for Cieneguilla, elevation 280 m (920 ft)
Month	Jan	Feb	Mar	Apr	May	Jun	Jul	Aug	Sep	Oct	Nov	Dec	Year
Mean daily maximum °C (°F)	28.3 (82.9)	29.9 (85.8)	30.5 (86.9)	27.9 (82.2)	24.2 (75.6)	22.3 (72.1)	20.8 (69.4)	20.8 (69.4)	21.2 (70.2)	23.0 (73.4)	25.0 (77.0)	26.4 (79.5)	25.0 (77.0)
Daily mean °C (°F)	23.2 (73.8)	24.3 (75.7)	25.4 (77.7)	22.3 (72.1)	19.6 (67.3)	18.4 (65.1)	17.2 (63.0)	17.1 (62.8)	17.1 (62.8)	18.2 (64.8)	19.8 (67.6)	21.1 (70.0)	20.3 (68.6)
Mean daily minimum °C (°F)	18.2 (64.8)	18.7 (65.7)	20.2 (68.4)	16.5 (61.7)	15.0 (59.0)	14.5 (58.1)	13.6 (56.5)	13.3 (55.9)	13.0 (55.4)	13.4 (56.1)	14.8 (58.6)	15.9 (60.6)	15.6 (60.1)
Average precipitation mm (inches)	2.1 (0.08)	0.0 (0.0)	2.1 (0.08)	0.3 (0.01)	0.0 (0.0)	0.1 (0.00)	1.0 (0.04)	0.2 (0.01)	0.0 (0.0)	0.1 (0.00)	0.3 (0.01)	0.2 (0.01)	6.4 (0.24)
Source: Plataforma del Estado Peruano
