= Comas District, Lima =

District in Lima, Peru

Comas
- District
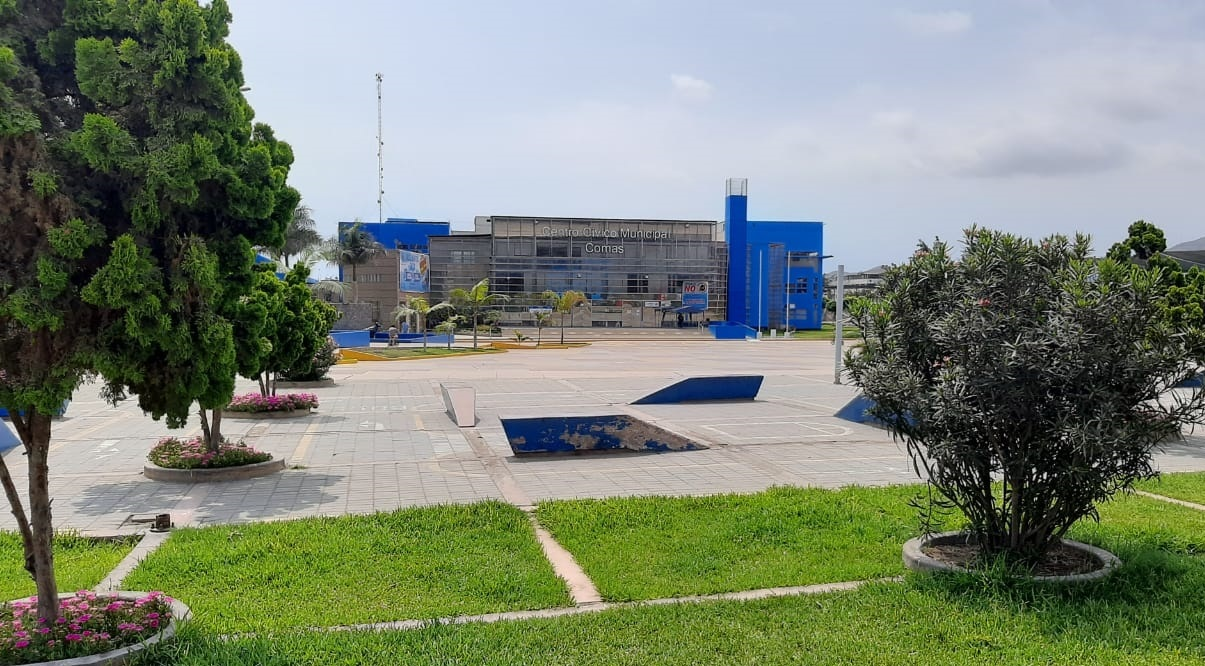

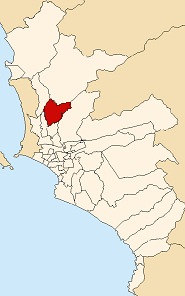
- Location of Comas in Lima
- Coordinates: 11°56′S 77°4′W
- Country: Peru
- Region: Lima
- Province: Lima
- Created: December 12, 1961
- Capital: La Libertad

Government
  - Mayor: Ulises Villegas (2023-2026)

Area
  - Total: 48.75 km^{2} (18.82 sq mi)
- 47.47 km² (without disputed area)
- Elevation: 140 m (460 ft)

Population (2023)
  - Total: 598,263
  - Density: 12,270/km^{2} (31,780/sq mi)
- Time zone: UTC-5 (PET)
- UBIGEO: 150110
- Website: municomas.gob.pe

Comas is one of the forty-three districts that make up the Lima Province in Peru, located in the department of the same name. It is located in the north area of the city. It is one of the most populous districts in Lima.

== Geography ==
Comas has a total land area of 48.75 km². Its administrative center is located 140 meters above sea level.

=== Boundaries ===
- North: Carabayllo
- East: San Juan de Lurigancho
- South: Independencia
- West: Puente Piedra and Los Olivos

== Borderline conflicts ==
In 1989 due to the territorial reduction of the San Martín de Porres district by the creation of the Los Olivos district, the old industrial area of 1.28 square kilometers, which is delimited by San Bernardo, Panamericana Norte and Gerardo Unger avenues, up to the next bank of the Chillón River, and made up of Santa Luisa, Santa Rosa de Infantas, Pro Industrial IV and IX Sector III Stage urbanizations; the Municipal Human Settlement No. 02; and the housing associations José de San Martín, José Carlos Mariátegui and San Miguel, became a disputed territory between Comas and San Martin de Porres.

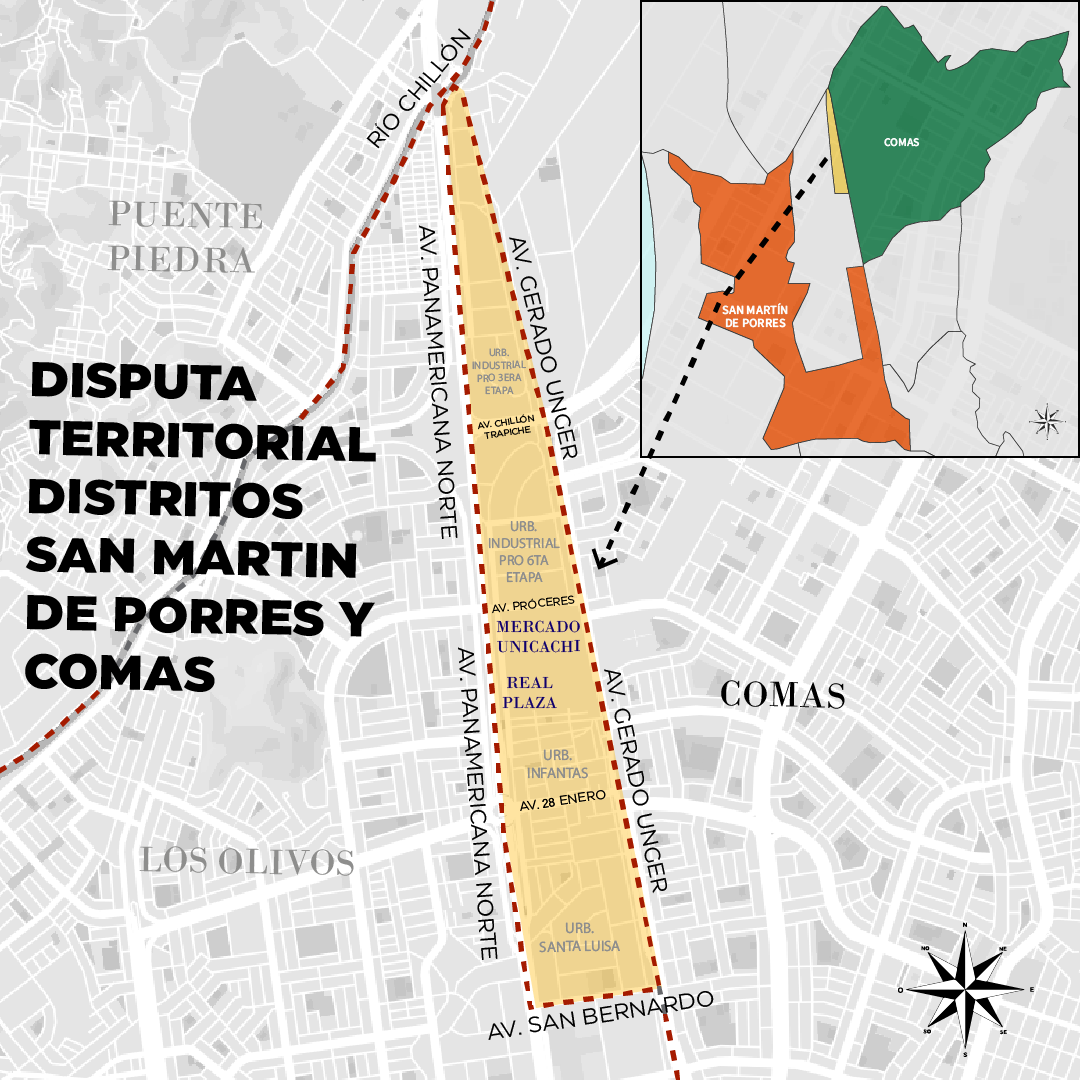
Disputed area of the Comas District and the San Martin de Porres District.

The position of the district of Comas is that due to the creation of Los Olivos, the area in dispute would be annexed because it is outside the territorial continuity of San Martín de Porres. On the other hand, the district of San Martín de Porres maintains that the law creating Los Olivos does not detail any territorial transfer to Comas or Independencia, in addition to not having been an express request from the residents. It also highlights that the law creating Comas (Law No. 13757) marks its limits on the old Panamericana Norte avenue, nowadays Túpac Amaru/Gerardo Unger Avenue.

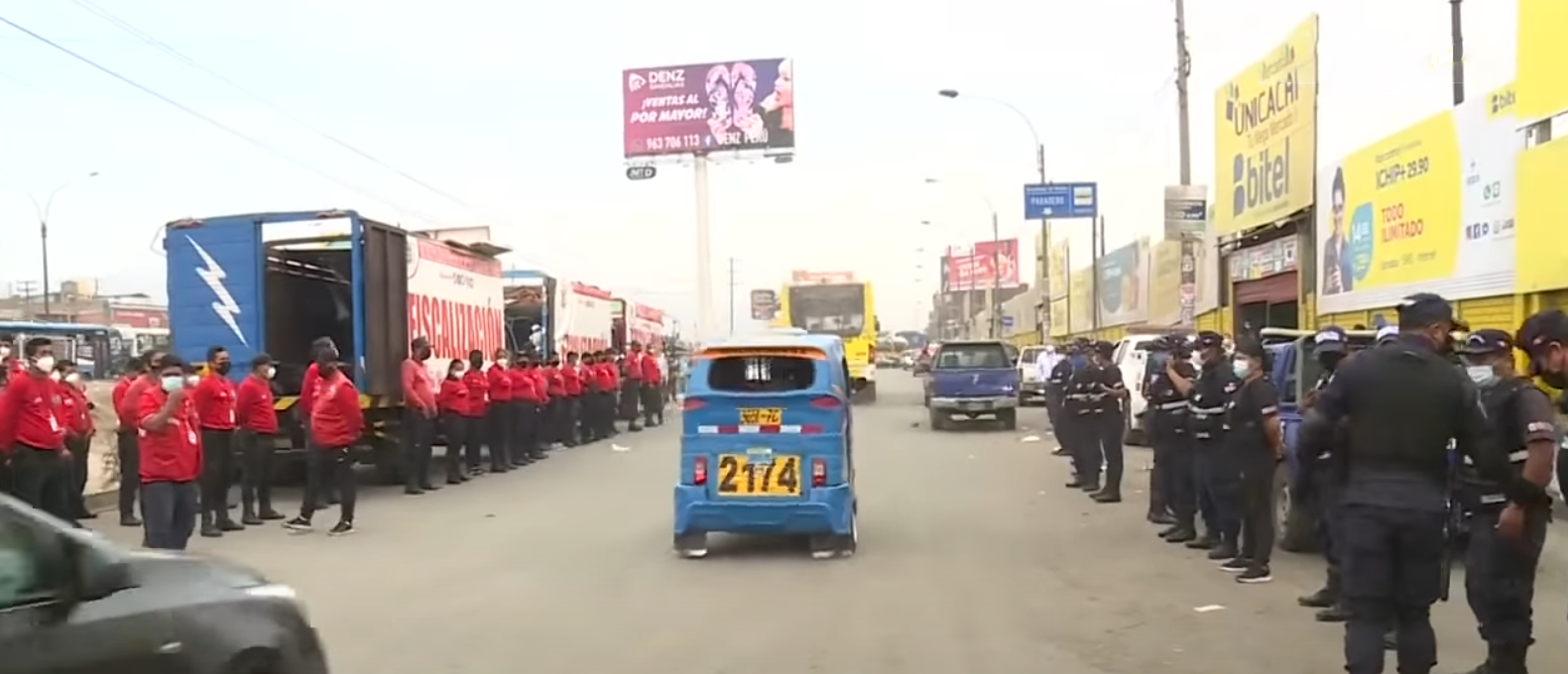
Conflict between night watchmen of San Martín de Porres and Comas.

The conflict also affects the municipal tax system since medium-sized and small businesses are taxed in both municipalities, however urbanizations are taxed in San Martín de Porres.

== Demographics ==
According to 2005 census conducted by the INEI, Comas has 464,745 inhabitants, a population density of 9,533.2 persons/km² and 100,950 households.

== History ==
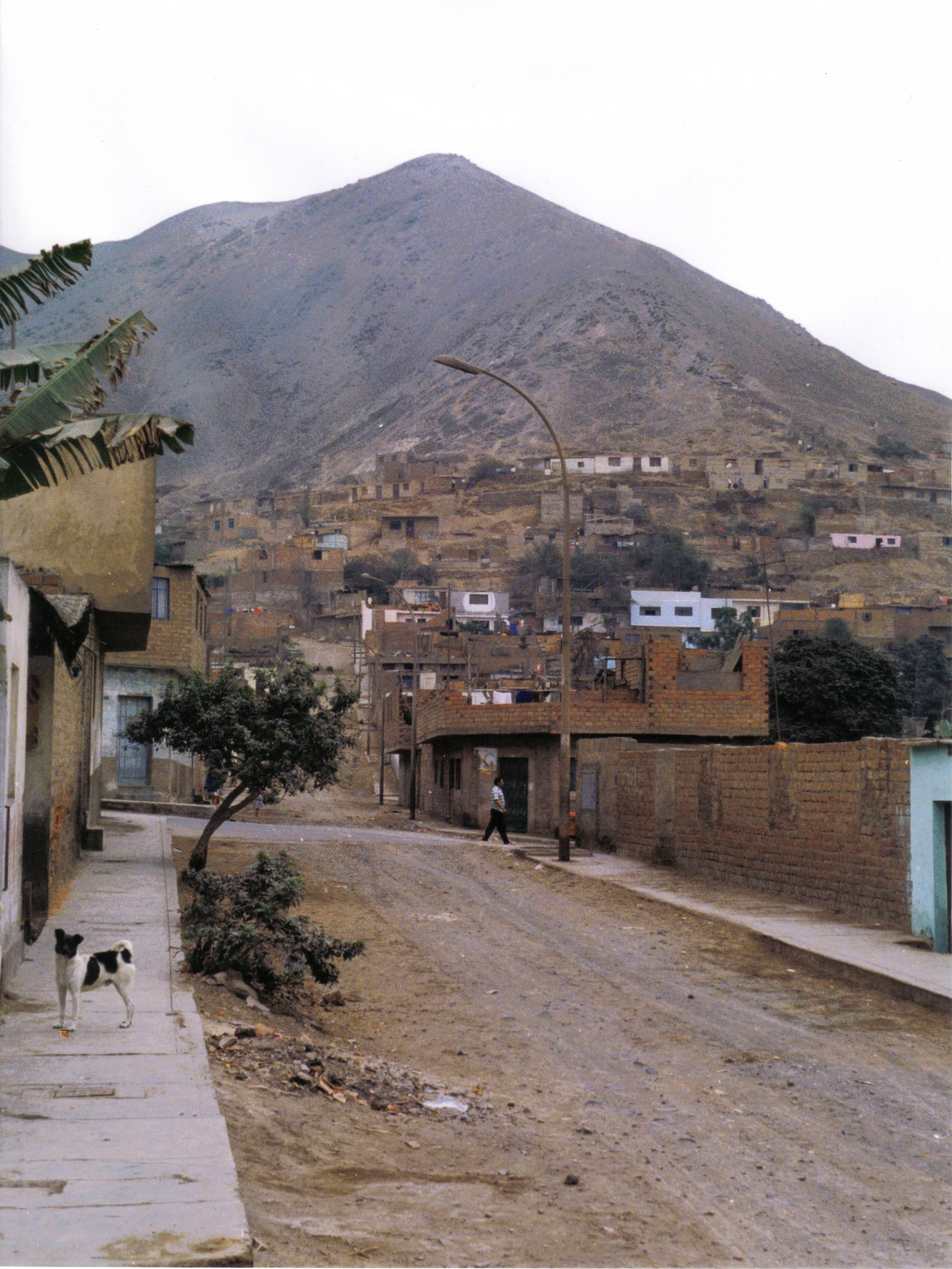
A street in Comas in 1993

During its first years of existence, Comas was a pueblo joven (human settlement). Its humble beginnings were a direct result of the many organized migrations led by immigrants from the highlands during the 1970s. Most of these peasants arrived from the regions of Junín and Huacanvelica in the central sierra of Peru.

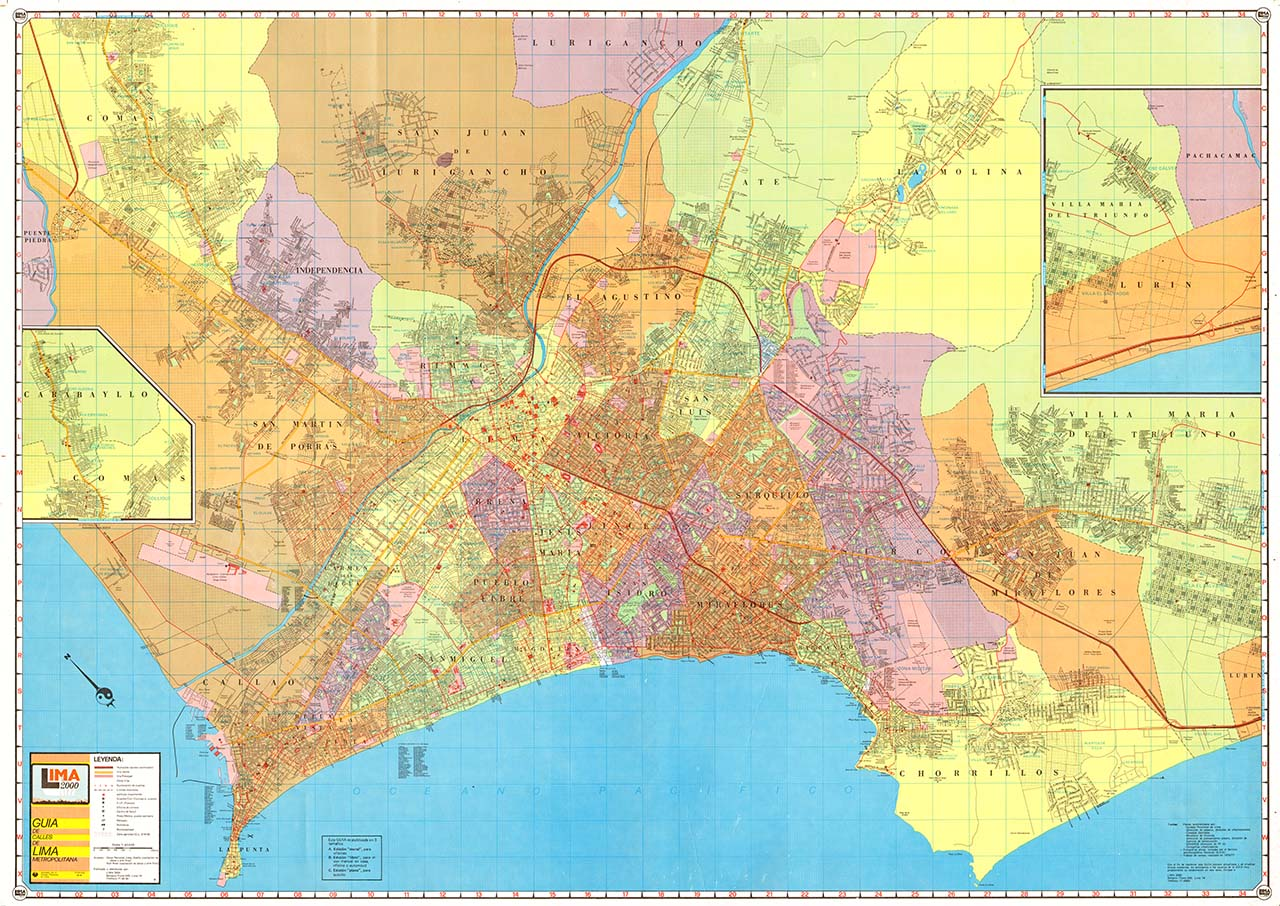
Comas district on the map of Metropolitan Lima in 1977

== Poverty ==
Comas is one of the poorest districts of Lima, although in recent years it has developed into a low-middle-class residential district. In 2019, the Mall Plaza Comas shopping centre was opened. The mall has major brand stores such as Adidas, Nike, Saga Falabella, Puma, and others.

== Transport and communications ==
There are 3 main roads serving the district: Túpac Amaru avenue, Universitaria avenue and the Chillón-Trapiche Highway.

== Today ==
In the last decade Comas' economy, infrastructure, and social structure has grown at a fast pace. It has a large middle-class, and has grown from a pueblo joven (human settlement) in a short period of time. However, in spite of this progress; it still exhibits new pueblos jovenes growing around the area that is today's Comas.

The only civil aviation school in Peru was located in Comas, at the Aeroclub de Collique.

== See also ==
- Administrative divisions of Peru
