= San Juan de Miraflores =

District in Lima, Peru

- District
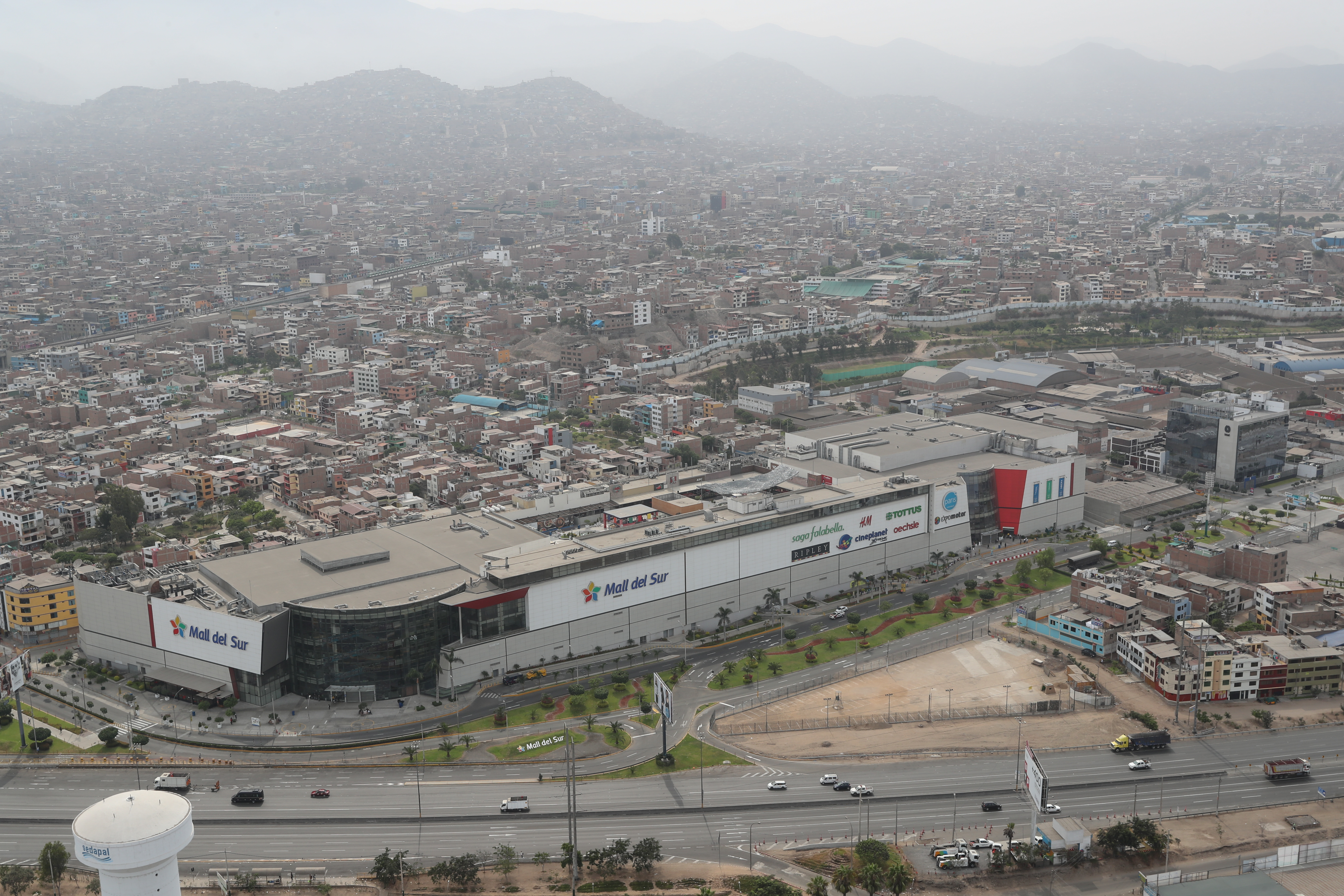

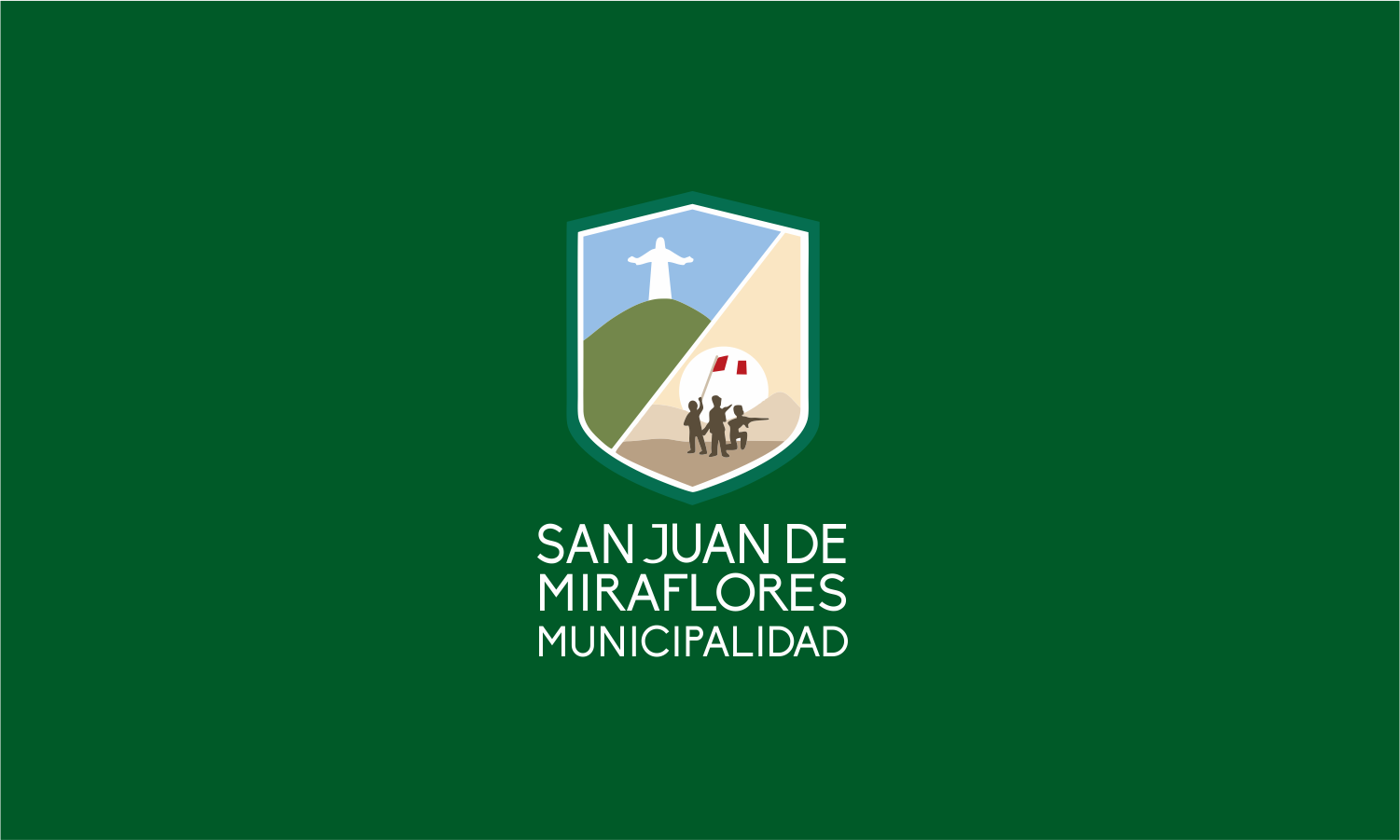
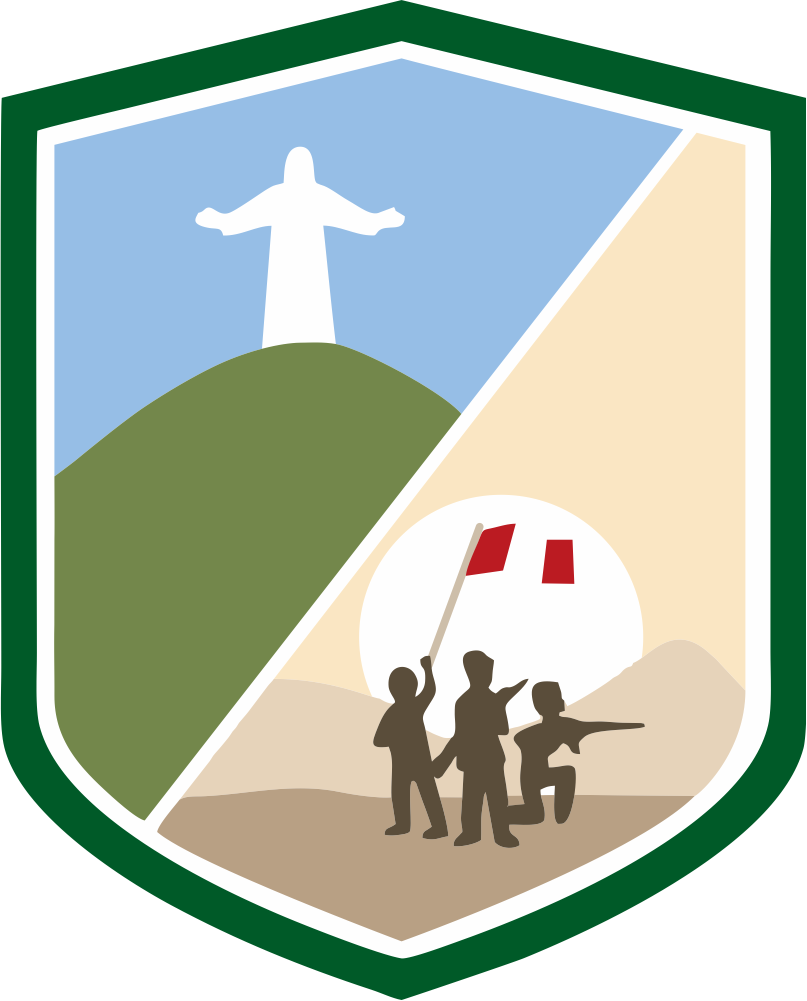
- Flag Coat of arms

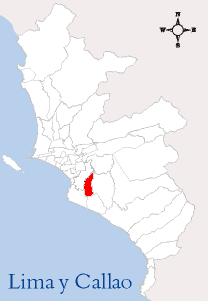
- Location of San Juan de Miraflores in Lima
- Coordinates: 12°9′5″S 76°58′12″W
- Country: Peru
- Province: Lima
- Created: January 12, 1965
- Capital: Ciudad de Dios
- Subdivisions: 6 zones

Government
  - Mayor: Delia Castro (2023-2026)

Area
  - Total: 23.98 km^{2} (9.26 sq mi)
- Elevation: 141 m (463 ft)

Population (2023)
  - Total: 430,772
  - Density: 17,960/km^{2} (46,530/sq mi)
- Time zone: UTC-5 (PET)
- UBIGEO: 150133
- Website: munisjm.gob.pe

San Juan de Miraflores (SJM) is one of the forty-three districts that make up the province of Lima, located in the department of the same name, in Peru. It is a new town, having been formed by the massive number of people moving from other towns of Metropolitan Lima (such as Miraflores, Surquillo, La Victoria, among others) and from the countryside. During the early 1960s, San Juan de Miraflores was mostly a desert area.

San Juan de Miraflores is divided into zones ("A", "B", "C", "D", "E", and "K"). In the early 80's, people from Cuzco, Ayacucho, Pasco, and many of the other departments that were under the attack of terrorists chose San Juan and Villa El Salvador as their new home. As new residents were coming into SJM, two new zones were created: Pamplona Alta and Pamplona Baja. This name was taken in honor of some of the Spanish missionaries (who were from Pamplona, Spain) who offered their help to the residents. One of Pamplona Alta's mains streets, "Pista Nueva" or "New Street", is an example of how new the area is. When it was first settled, many people lived without electricity, water or plumbing, often building their houses from reed mats into the steep hills, with treacherous paths leading to the houses at the top. As residents could afford building materials, they would begin to reinforce these reed mats with plywood, bricks, or whatever else they could find.

Today, the houses are built using a mixture of materials, and many remain under construction as residents can afford to add more bricks. Most have access to electricity, but many still lack running water or plumbing. In just the last couple of years the mayor of Lima has launched an extremely successful program to build concrete staircases, or "escapers", into the hillsides, replacing the treacherous paths and dramatically improving the living conditions of residents. These staircases are distinctively painted yellow, with bright blue signs, and neighborhood residents are hired by the city to build them.

In addition to these new zones, two more were created. By the year 1981, America and Umamarca were created. Usually, these new zones are well known because of its highly interest of being better every day, since most of the owners are the people, who worked most of their lives (and still do) in Ciudad de Dios' Market. These areas were urbanized quickly.

By 1983 and 1984, two new more zones had been created - Maria Auxiliadora and Amauta ("teacher" in English), located between zones "A" and "B". One of the main streets of Maria Auxiliadora is Pedro Miotta, which was well known as the former Panamericana Sur freeway.

== Geography ==
The district is located in the south of Lima. It has a total land area of 23.98 km^{2}. Its administrative center is located 141 meters above sea level.

=== Boundaries ===
- North: La Molina
- East: Villa María del Triunfo
- South: Villa El Salvador and Chorrillos.
- West: Santiago de Surco

== Demographics ==
According to the 2005 census by the INEI, the district has 335,237 inhabitants, a population density of 13,979.9 persons/km^{2} and 71,384 households.

== Urban structure ==
The history and urban growth in San Juan de Miraflores has occurred gradually, which has been marked in six areas. This, according to Ordinance No. 1018-MML, published on July 11, 2007 by the Metropolitan Municipality of Lima.

Zone No. 1 or Pamplona Alta Zone, includes all the sectors whose limits go from Defensores de Lima Avenue to the north of the district, whose limits are the adjacent hills. There are the urban spaces of San Luis, 28 de Julio, El Brillantes, Malvinas, Alfonso Ugarte, Miguel Grau, Leoncio Prado, Nazareno, San Francisco de la Cruz, Buenos Milagros, Los Laureles, Virgen del Buen Paso, Ollantay, Rinconada, Nueva Rinconada, among others. This last urban settlement was described in a thesis developed in 2000. Likewise, the northern area of Pamplona Alta was historically recognized as a place of hills. Recently, this recognition is being given at a legal level.

Zone No. 2 or Pamplona Baja Zone, on this land the urbanizations of Ciudad de Dios, Pamplona Baja, San Juanito, Arenal San Juan, La Gloria, 13 de Enero and Andrés Avelino Cáceres are established. It is in the central part of the district, in a strip that runs parallel between Los Héroes and Defensores de Lima avenues. It borders the districts of Santiago de Surco and Villa María del Triunfo. The district capital, according to law No. 15382, is located in this area. Its full name is Urbanización Popular Ciudad de Dios, which is organized internally into zone A and K. The housing modules were delivered (through sale) in 1958.

Zone No. 3 or Urban Zone, this name is a little confusing, since, before the existence of the San Juan A urbanization, there were the urbanizations of Ciudad de Dios, Pamplona (Baja) and others in the process of construction. It includes the San Juan urbanizations (organized into zone A, B, C, D, E1 and E2).

Zone No. 4 or María Auxiliadora Zone, is located in the southern part of the district, with sandy and salty terrain, starting on Miguel Iglesias Avenue to the left. It borders in the upper part with the district of Villa María del Triunfo. It has 16 urban establishments, including Martín de San Juan. The María Auxiliadora General Hospital is located in this area.

Zone No. 5 or Pampas Zone of San Juan, located in the southern part of the district, covers an approximate area of 350 hectares of rugged terrain and wastelands of sandy and salty consistency. It borders the districts of Villa El Salvador and Villa María del Triunfo. There is the industrial zone. It has 46 urban settlements. Among these urban settlements we have Fortaleza, Trebo Azul, Felipe Alva y Alva, La Ciudad de los Ninos and the Huayna Capac Zonal Park. In this area is the well-known Children's City of the Immaculate Conception, founded in 1955 by the Capuchin Franciscan brother Francisco Minasso of Riva Ligure, known as the "Iluminated Father", who collected abandoned children from the street.

Zone No. 6 or Pan-American South Zone, is located in the western part of the district and covers the right strip that runs parallel to the Pan-American South Highway, for an approximate extension of 6 kilometers, from the Amauta Bridge to kilometer 18 of the Pan-American Highway. It borders the districts of Santiago de Surco and Chorrillos. It has 50 urban settlements. Among these we have Umamarca, Las Américas, Los Eucaliptos, Las Dunas.

There is talk of Zone No. 7, corresponding to the Monterrico Sur Urbanizations and other areas bordering the district of Santiago de Surco. Remember that the district of San Juan de Miraflores since its legal-political existence, the west bordered the avenue now known as Caminos del Inca avenue. This is usually one of the reasons for seeking a solution to the border dispute between the authorities of these districts.

== Notable people ==
- Pedro Gallese (b. 1990) – professional footballer
- Manuel Uribe (b. 1948) – professional footballer

== See also ==
- Administrative divisions of Peru
