= Pachacámac District =

District in Lima, Peru

Coordinates: 12°13′48″S 76°51′33″W

Pachacámac
- District
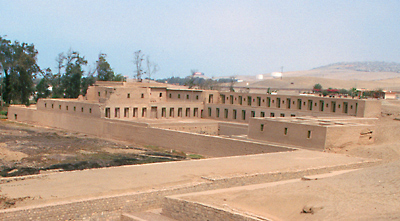
- Pachacámac archaeological site

- Coat of arms

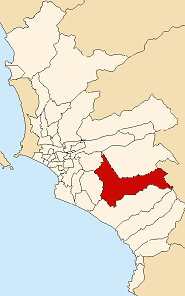
- Location of Pachacámac in the Lima province
- Country: Peru
- Region: Lima
- Province: Lima
- Founded: January 2, 1857
- Capital: Pachacamac
- Subdivisions: 11 populated centers

Government
  - Mayor: Enrique Cabrera (2023-2026)

Area
  - Total: 160.23 km^{2} (61.87 sq mi)
- Elevation: 75 m (246 ft)

Population (2023)
  - Total: 153,189
  - Density: 956.06/km^{2} (2,476.2/sq mi)
- Time zone: UTC-5 (PET)
- UBIGEO: 150123
- Website: munipachacamac.gob.pe

Pachacámac is one of 43 districts of the Lima Province in Peru. The capital of the district is the village of Pachacámac. Its main asset is the archaeological Inca site Pachacámac.

== Geography ==
The district is located in the southern part of the Lima province at an elevation of 75m.

=== Boundaries ===
- North: La Molina, Ate Vitarte and Cieneguilla.
- East: Cieneguilla and Huarochirí Province.
- South: Lurín
- West: Villa María del Triunfo

== History ==
Pachacámac was first encountered by the european Hernándo Pizarro on January 30, 1530, while on his quest for gold and his search for a location of a new capital. In 1573, the city of Santísimo Salvador de Pachacámac was founded. In 1857, Pachacámac was founded as a republican district.

== Political division ==
The district is divided into 11 populated centers (Spanish: Centros Poblados):

- Pachacámac
- Puente Manchay
- Tambo Inga
- Pampa Flores
- Manchay Alto Lote B
- Invasion Cementerio
- Manchay Bajo
- Santa Rosa de Mal Paso
- Cardal
- Jatosisa
- Tomina

== Capital ==
The capital of the Pachacámac district is the village of Pachacámac.

== Climate ==
Climate data for Pachacámac District (Manchay Bajo), elevation 148 m (486 ft)
Month	Jan	Feb	Mar	Apr	May	Jun	Jul	Aug	Sep	Oct	Nov	Dec	Year
Mean daily maximum °C (°F)	26.9 (80.4)	27.8 (82.0)	27.5 (81.5)	25.9 (78.6)	23.2 (73.8)	20.5 (68.9)	19.5 (67.1)	19.2 (66.6)	19.8 (67.6)	21.5 (70.7)	23.0 (73.4)	25.1 (77.2)	23.3 (74.0)
Daily mean °C (°F)	22.6 (72.7)	23.4 (74.1)	23.1 (73.6)	21.5 (70.7)	19.4 (66.9)	17.6 (63.7)	16.8 (62.2)	16.4 (61.5)	16.7 (62.1)	18.0 (64.4)	19.3 (66.7)	21.1 (70.0)	19.7 (67.4)
Mean daily minimum °C (°F)	18.2 (64.8)	19.0 (66.2)	18.8 (65.8)	17.1 (62.8)	15.5 (59.9)	14.7 (58.5)	14.1 (57.4)	13.6 (56.5)	13.7 (56.7)	14.5 (58.1)	15.6 (60.1)	17.0 (62.6)	16.0 (60.8)
Average relative humidity (%)	82	81	81	79	84	87	87	88	87	84	81	80	83
Source: Plataforma del Estado Peruano

== See also ==
- Administrative divisions of Peru
