= Administrative divisions of Peru =

The administrative divisions of Peru have included since 2002 a regional level consisting of departments or regions (departamentos; informally regiones), and a local level consisting of provinces (provincias), which are further divided into districts (distritos). In addition, below the district level, the constitution permits the creation of populated centers (Centros poblados) by provincial governments.

== History ==
Peru's administrative subidivison has changed from time to time since the nation gained independence from Spain in the early 19th century. The old territorial subdivisions have split or merged due to several reasons, the most common ones being the need for decentralization and population increase, especially in Lima. A failed attempt to divide the country into twelve autonomous regions had previously been made during the 1980s under the government of Alan García.

== Subdivisions ==
=== Departments ===
Peru is divided into 24 departments, informally known as regions, each operating under their own regional government (Spanish: gobierno regional). In addition, two provinces—Callao and Lima—are subject to a special regime equal in status to the aforementioned, with the latter not belonging to any department and operating under its own regional government. Lima, on the other hand, operates under a quasi-autonomous special regime, as it functions under the jurisdiction of the Metropolitan Municipality of Lima instead of the Regional Government of Lima.

Regional governments consist of an elected regional governor and regional council.

=== Provinces ===
The departments of Peru are further divided into 196 provinces administered as provincial municipalities (Spanish: municipalidades provinciales). Provincial governments consists of an elected provincial mayor and provincial council.

=== Districts ===
The provinces of Peru are further divided into 1,695 districts administered as district municipalities (Spanish: municipalidades distritales). Districts government consists of an elected district mayor and district council.

For a new district to be legally established, a 1982 law requires a minimum number of residents to live in the area: 3,500 if it is located in the rainforest, 4,000 in the Andes highlands, and 10,000 in the coastal area.

In the dry Andean area, many districts have fewer than 3,500 inhabitants. In some cases, their populations have decreased in comparison to the days when they were founded. Districts that are located at very high altitudes tend to be scarcely populated. These districts are usually large in area but have little available level land for use. Many basic government services do not reach all residents of these districts due to their difficult geography. Many such districts lack the financial means to govern their whole jurisdictions and often have high emigration rates.

A similar pattern can be observed in many districts located in the Peruvian Amazon rainforest. Once important settlements created during the era of colonization, they now do not offer much space for agriculture. Deeper into the jungle, the districts of the selva baja (lower jungle) have higher populations living in geographically large districts. Districts located outside the former colonized area have very low populations, which are entirely composed of native Amazonian tribes.

All over the country, many districts have higher populations than the minimum required by law. This is true of the colonized areas of the rainforest and the northern Andes, as well as in the southern Andes from Huancayo to the shores of Lake Titicaca, which is the historical heartland of the Peruvian highlands. These districts are old centers of civilization; they tend to be smaller in area, with high population densities since pre-Hispanic times.

Districts in the Chala (coastal area) tend to be mid-sized, except in low-density areas such as the Sechura Desert and part of the southern coast. All have gained large populations due to emigration from other regions of the country, which has turned the Peruvian coast into the country's main economic powerhouse.

Districts with a population of more than 10,000 inhabitants should ideally be subdivided, particularly if they are also large in area, as is the case in part of the Amazon rainforest. Settlement can happen quickly and boundaries of districts are often not modified, except in large urban areas. This is less of a problem on the coast, where communication is easier. However, reaching large populations remain a problem in this area.

=== Populated centres ===
Districts are further subdivided into populated centres. As of 2022, there are 2,859 populated centers in total, which are administered by municipalities headed by a mayor elected every four years. Aditionally, Peru's Instituto Nacional de Estadística e Informática (INEI) divides the country into functional categories for censal purposes.

== See also ==
- Municipalities of Peru
