= Lurigancho-Chosica =

District of Lima, Peru

Lurigancho (Note: Often known as Lurigancho-Chosica or as Chosica to distinguish it from San Juan de Lurigancho.)
- District
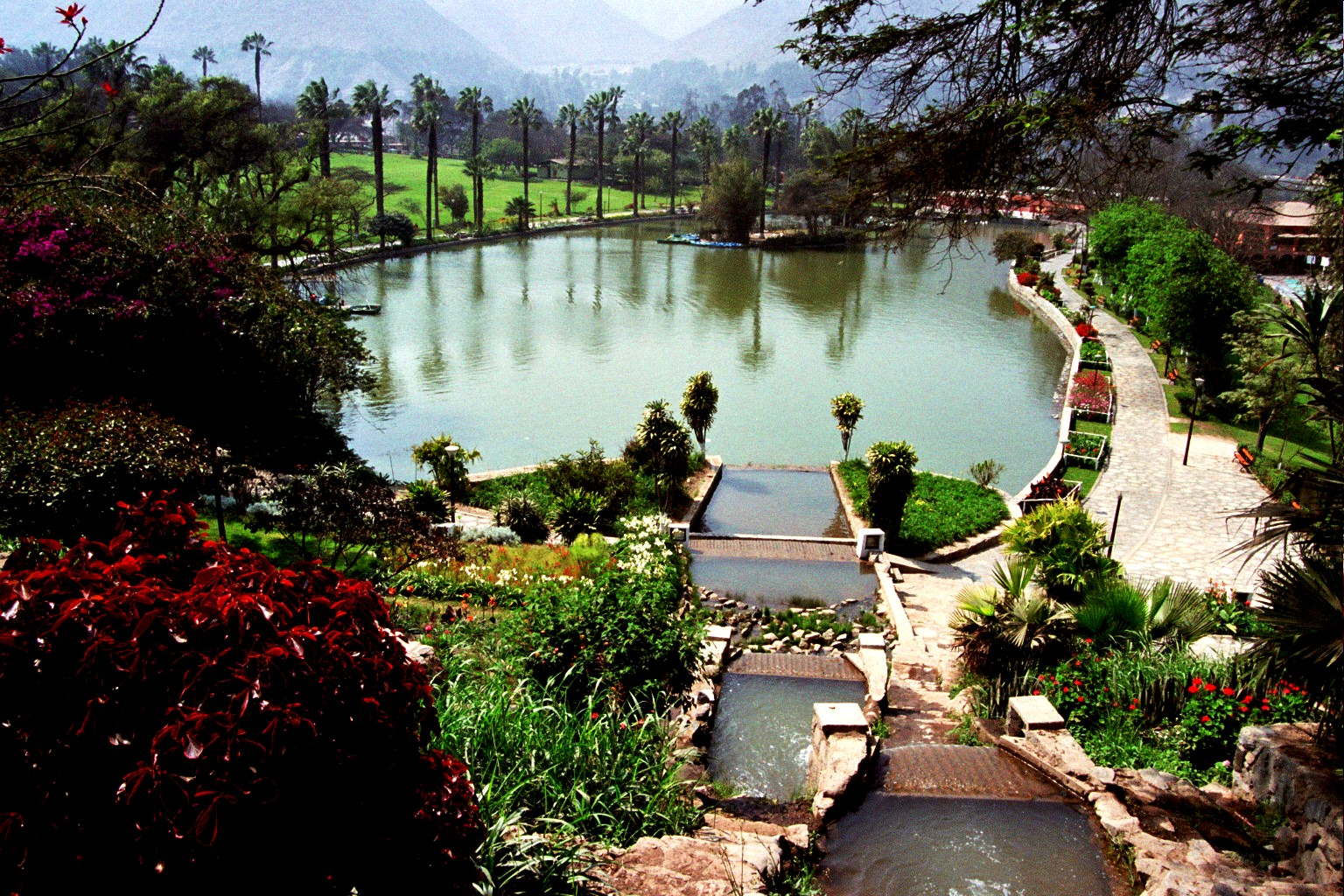
- View of El Bosque Country Club

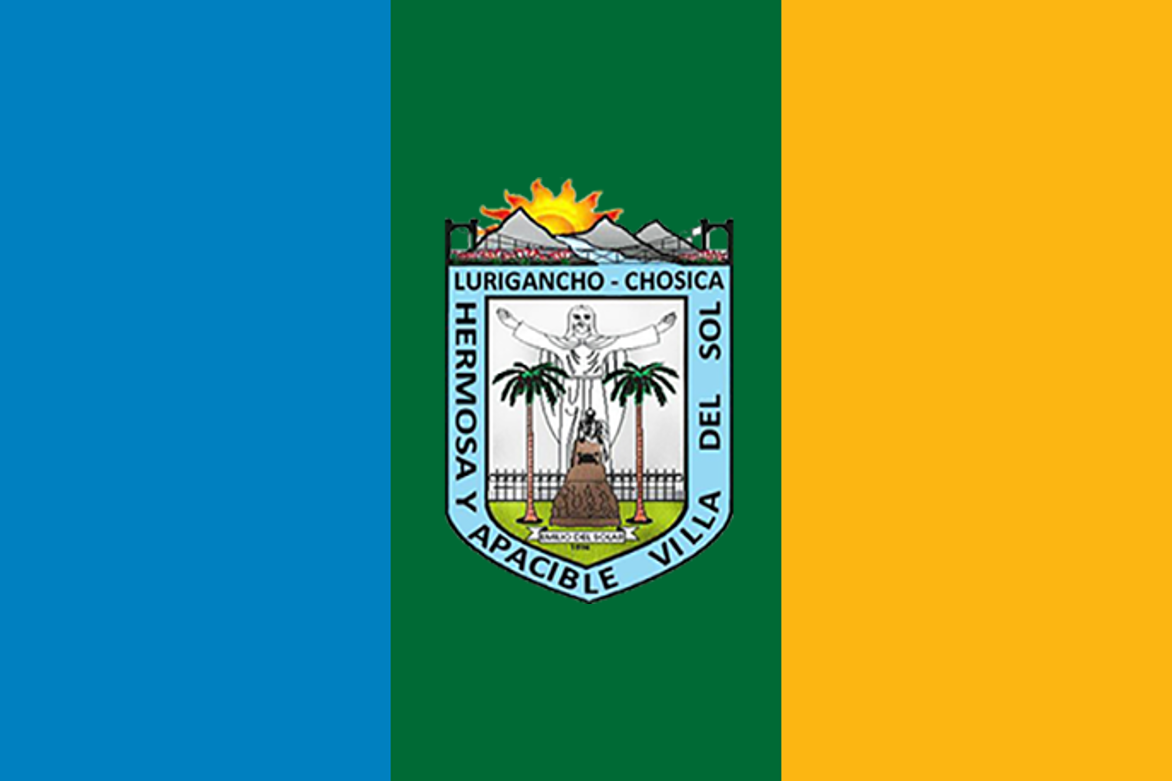
- Flag Coat of arms

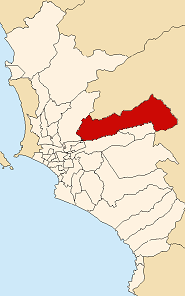
- Location of Lurigancho in Peru
- Coordinates: 12°02′S 77°01′W
- Country: Peru
- Department: Lima
- Province: Lima
- Founded: January 2, 1857
- Capital: Chosica

Government
  - Mayor: Oswaldo Vargas (2023-2026)

Area
  - Total: 236.47 km^{2} (91.30 sq mi)
- Elevation: 861 m (2,825 ft)

Population (2023)
  - Total: 303,966
  - Density: 1,285.4/km^{2} (3,329.3/sq mi)
- Time zone: UTC-5 (PET)
- UBIGEO: 150118
- Website: munichosica.gob.pe

Lurigancho is a district of Lima, Peru. It is located in the valley of the Rímac River, which it shares with neighboring Chaclacayo and Ate districts. Its capital is the town of Chosica, located 861 m (2,825 ft) above sea level.

== Etymology ==
The district's official name is "Lurigancho," a name with two possible origins. It is either the changed name of a pre-Columbian culture (Ruricancho), or taken from Hurin Huancho (lit. 'Huancho of the Valley'), a term used to describe the Huancho, an ethnic group that established a cacicazgo of the same name.

In order to distinguish it from San Juan de Lurigancho, a district that separated from Lurigancho District in 1967, it is commonly known as Lurigancho-Chosica, or simply as Chosica, after the populated centre of the same name. The district's official name has often caused confusion between both districts, leading to the prevalence of its unofficial names.

== History ==
The district was created on January 2, 1857, with the town of Lurigancho (in the current San Juan de Lurigancho district, split off in 1967) as its capital. It had a population of 1248 inhabitants, most of them dedicated to agricultural activities, according to the census of 1876.

== Politics ==
Its capital, Chosica, is located in the extreme east of the district, near the border with the Province of Huarochirí.

=== Subdivisions ===
Lurigancho has one minor populated centre inside the urban core of Lima, which is Santa María de Huachipa which is located in the extreme west of the district and adjacent to San Juan de Lurigancho. Other notable urban areas in this zone are Jicamarca and Cajamarquilla, where one of the principal zinc refineries of the country is located. In the mountain zone in proximity to the refinery is located the Jicamarca Radio Observatory.

== Geography ==
=== Boundaries ===
- North: Huarochirí Province in the Lima Region
- East: Huarochirí Province
- South: Chaclacayo, Ate and El Agustino
- West: San Juan de Lurigancho

=== Climate ===
Climate data for Ñaña (Peruvian Union University), elevation 543 m (1,781 ft), (1991–2020)
Month	Jan	Feb	Mar	Apr	May	Jun	Jul	Aug	Sep	Oct	Nov	Dec	Year
Mean daily maximum °C (°F)	26.3 (79.3)	27.2 (81.0)	27.1 (80.8)	26.2 (79.2)	24.7 (76.5)	22.5 (72.5)	21.6 (70.9)	21.9 (71.4)	22.7 (72.9)	23.5 (74.3)	24.1 (75.4)	25.0 (77.0)	24.4 (75.9)
Mean daily minimum °C (°F)	17.3 (63.1)	18.4 (65.1)	18.4 (65.1)	17.2 (63.0)	15.2 (59.4)	12.8 (55.0)	11.8 (53.2)	11.4 (52.5)	12.5 (54.5)	13.7 (56.7)	14.5 (58.1)	15.7 (60.3)	14.9 (58.8)
Average precipitation mm (inches)	0.7 (0.03)	1.1 (0.04)	0.4 (0.02)	0.1 (0.00)	0.2 (0.01)	0.6 (0.02)	0.7 (0.03)	0.5 (0.02)	0.4 (0.02)	0.3 (0.01)	0.2 (0.01)	0.3 (0.01)	5.5 (0.22)
Average relative humidity (%)	86.9	87.1	87.7	87.4	87.5	88.0	88.4	88.5	87.9	87.6	87.6	87.5	87.7
Source 1: NOAA
Source 2: Servicio Nacional de Certificación Ambiental para las Inversiones Sostenibles (humidity)

Climate data for Chosica (National University of Education Enrique Guzmán y Valle), elevation 851 m (2,792 ft)
Month	Jan	Feb	Mar	Apr	May	Jun	Jul	Aug	Sep	Oct	Nov	Dec	Year
Mean daily maximum °C (°F)	27.3 (81.1)	27.7 (81.9)	28.0 (82.4)	26.0 (78.8)	23.5 (74.3)	21.9 (71.4)	21.3 (70.3)	22.4 (72.3)	23.7 (74.7)	24.8 (76.6)	25.5 (77.9)	25.9 (78.6)	24.8 (76.7)
Daily mean °C (°F)	22.5 (72.5)	23.2 (73.8)	23.1 (73.6)	21.7 (71.1)	18.9 (66.0)	17.2 (63.0)	16.1 (61.0)	17.1 (62.8)	18.2 (64.8)	19.1 (66.4)	20.3 (68.5)	20.9 (69.6)	19.9 (67.8)
Mean daily minimum °C (°F)	17.8 (64.0)	18.5 (65.3)	18.2 (64.8)	17.4 (63.3)	14.4 (57.9)	12.5 (54.5)	10.9 (51.6)	11.8 (53.2)	12.7 (54.9)	13.5 (56.3)	15.1 (59.2)	15.9 (60.6)	14.9 (58.8)
Average precipitation mm (inches)	5.7 (0.22)	7.7 (0.30)	6.2 (0.24)	1.2 (0.05)	0.2 (0.01)	0.0 (0.0)	0.0 (0.0)	0.0 (0.0)	0.1 (0.00)	0.1 (0.00)	0.2 (0.01)	1.8 (0.07)	23.2 (0.9)
Source: Plataforma del Estado Peruano

== Demographics ==
According to a 2002 estimate by the INEI, the district has 125,088 inhabitants and a population density of 529 persons/km². In 1999, there were 32,327 households in the district.

== Culture ==
=== Education ===
Colegio Peruano-Alemán Beata Imelda, a German school, is in the district.

Colegio Santa Rosa de Chosica, private, Catholic School.

Colegio 0058 Cusco

== See also ==
- Administrative divisions of Peru
