= German Peruvians =

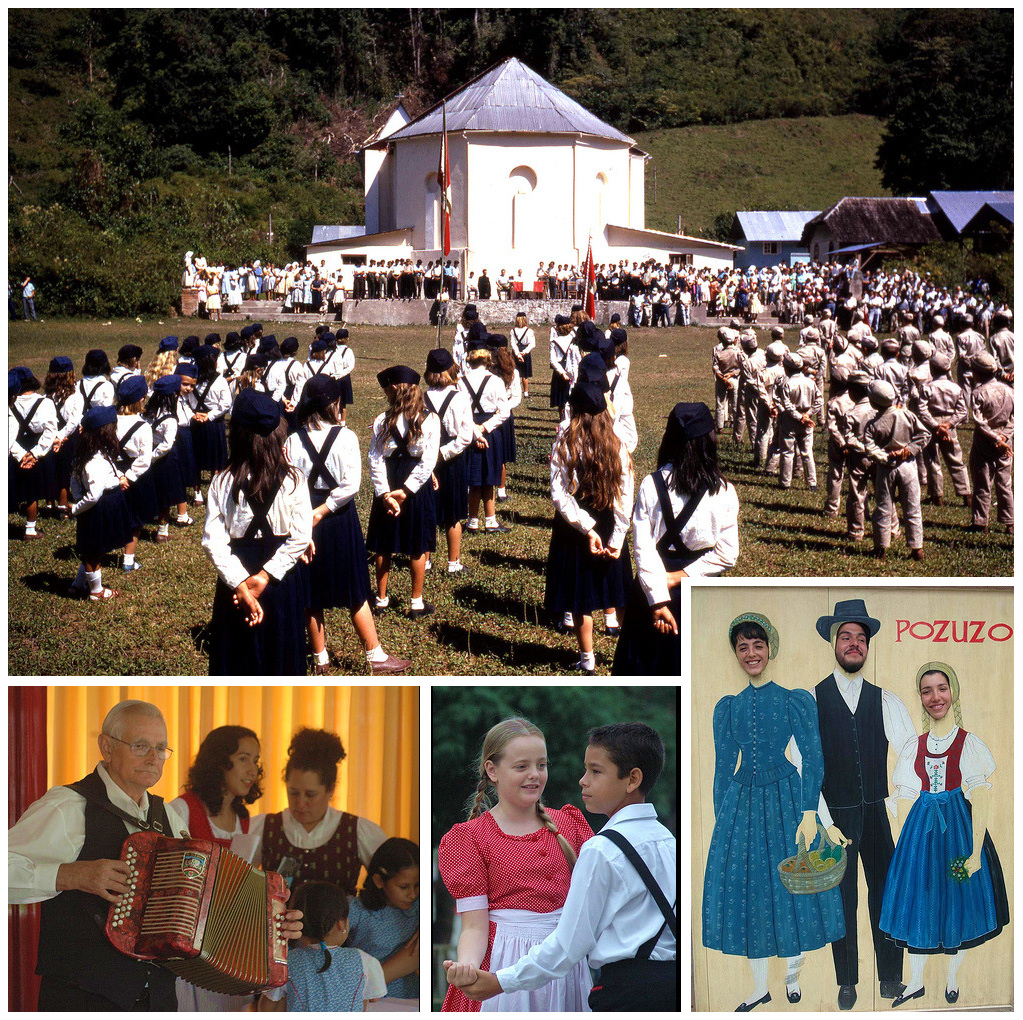
- (Germany) (Peru)

Total population
- +50k Estimated

Regions with significant populations
- Lima, Oxapampa, Pozuzo, Villa Rica, Trujillo

Languages
- Spanish, German, Hunsrik, Austrian German

Religion
- Roman Catholicism, Protestantism, Judaism

German Peruvians are Peruvian citizens of full or partial German ancestry. In general, the term is also applied to descendants of other German-speaking immigrants, such as Austrians or the Swiss, or to someone who has immigrated to Peru from German-speaking countries, such as German Italians (Italian citizens of German descent and speak German language).

== 20th century ==
During World War II, some German Peruvians fell under the influence of Nazi Germany and began their own branches of the Nazi Party. About 2,000 German Peruvians lived in Peru during World War II, with the total number of known active Nazi party members in Peru being documented at more than 200. Prominent families such as the Emmel family in Arequipa and Fischer family in Andahuaylas, the Albrecht family in Cusco and the Schäfer family in Piura signed their names as Nazi Party members. Carl Dedering led the Nazi Party in Peru and much of the documentation regarding the party in Peru was lost, some of it burned by party members to prevent incrimination. In the remote village of Pozuzo, the Nazi Flag would be raised on the town's flagpole.

Peru's government would abide by British blacklists targeting German businesses in the country during the war. The Alexander Humboldt School in Lima was a meeting place for five branches of the Nazi Party, with the school's director and teachers being deported to internment camps in the United States for being leaders. After Peru broke diplomatic relations with Germany in 1942, some naturalized German Peruvians were sent to internment camps in the United States. Many German Peruvians placed their accounts in the Embassy of Francoist Spain due to its closeness with Nazi Germany, with about 3 million soles being present by 1945.

== Education ==
German schools in Peru:

- Colegio Peruano-Alemán Beata Imelda
- Deutsche Schule Lima Alexander von Humboldt (Lima)
- Deutsche Schule Max Uhle Arequipa
- Reina del Mundo Schule (Colegio Peruano-Alemán Reina del Mundo)

== Notable German Peruvians ==
- Andrea Moberg
- Moritz Hochschild
- Liesel Holler
- Federico Kauffmann
- Jorge Koechlin
- Maju Mantilla
- Alberto Thieroldt
- Edith Noeding
- Gladys Zender
- Barton Zwiebach
- Juliane Koepcke
- Martha Hildebrandt
- Antonio Brack Egg
- Isaac Mekler
- Christian Meier
- Guillermo Wiese de Osma
- Guillermo Lohmann Villena
- Francisco Sagasti
- Tracy Freundt
- Hans Rudolf Oehlhey
- Nancy Lange

== German Peruvian institutions and associations ==
- Instituto Superior Tecnologico Privado Peruano
- Colegio Peruano Alemán - Alexander von Humboldt
- Colegio Waldorf Lima
- Asociación Peruano Alemán Leopoldo Krause
- Colegio Peruano Alemán "Beata Imelda"
- Instituto Cultural Peruano Aleman
- Colegio Peruano-Alemán "Max Uhle"
- Colegio Peruano Alemán Augusto Weberbauer
- Club Peruano Aleman
- CAPA - Centro de Amistad Peruano Alemán
- Cámara de Comercio e Industria Peruano-Alemana
- Archivo de la Inmigración Alemana en el Perú
- Asociación Cultural Johannes Gutenberg
- Asociación Médica Peruana-Alemán
- Beneficencia peruano-alemana / Deutsch-peruanischer Hilfsverein
- Centro Mallqui
- Fundación Brandt
- Humboldt Club del Perú
- Instituto Cultural Peruano Alemán de Arequipa
- Cultural Acupari
- Agro Acción Alemana / Deutsche Welthungerhilfe (DWHH)
- Comisión Brandt
- Instituto Goethe

== See also ==
- Germany–Peru relations
- German diaspora
- Immigration to Peru
