= Chosica =

Populated centre in Lima, Peru

- Populated centre
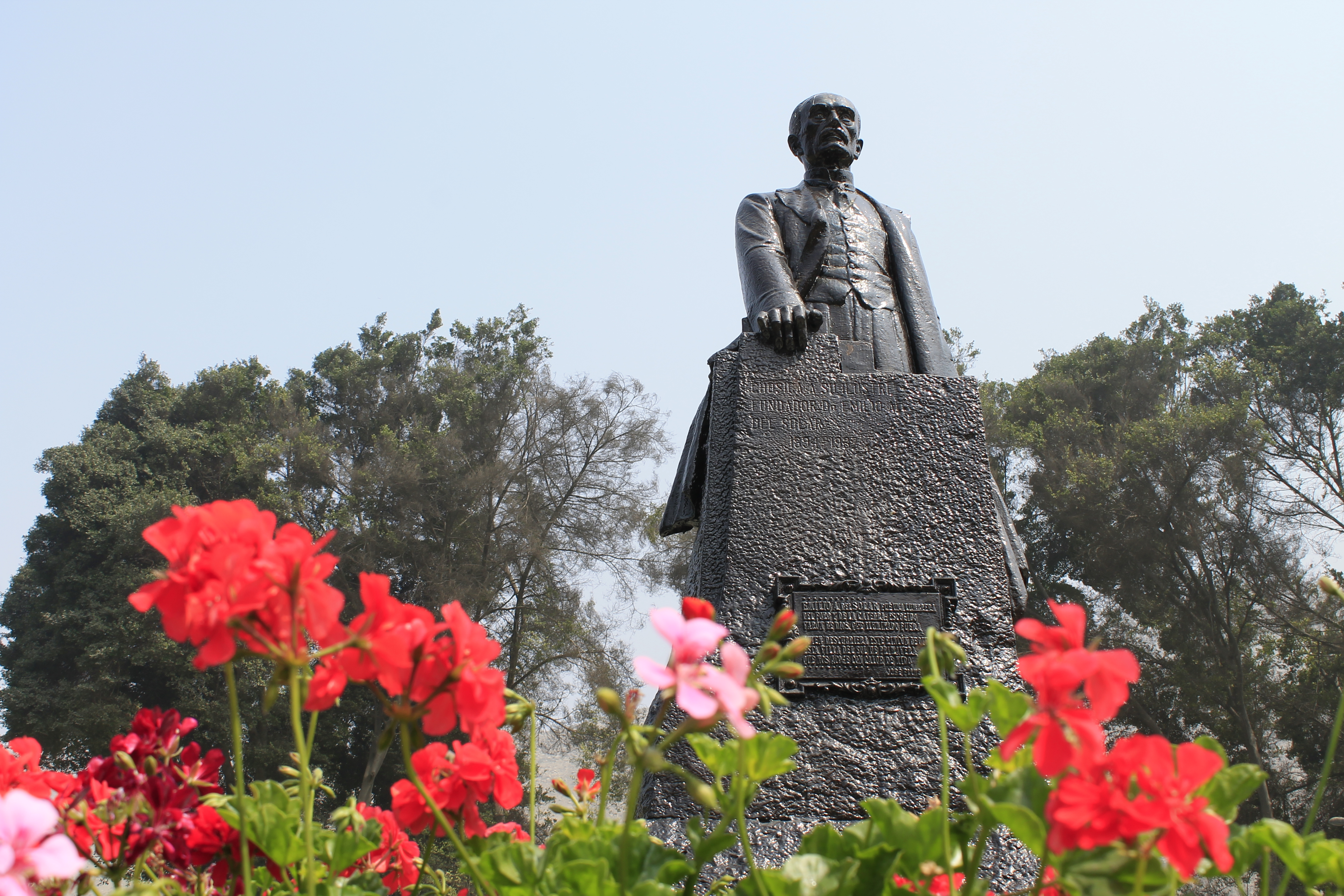
- Monument to Emilio del Solar
- Etymology: Cchusica (Aymara for 'owl')
- Motto: La hermosa villa del Sol
- Interactive map of Chosica
- Country: Peru
- Department: Lima
- Province: Lima
- District: Lurigancho-Chosica
- Established: October 13, 1894
- Founder: Emilio del Solar

Area
  - Total: 236.47 km^{2} (91.30 sq mi)

Population (2017)
  - Total: 20,000
  - Density: 85/km^{2} (220/sq mi)
- Demonym(s): chosicano, -na
- Time zone: UTC-5 (PET)

Cultural Heritage of Peru
- Official name: Zona Monumental de Chosica
- Type: Immobable tangible
- Designated: November 4, 1993
- Legal basis: R.J. Nº 548-83-INC/J

Chosica is a populated centre and the political capital of Lurigancho-Chosica, a district of Lima, Peru. With a total area of 236.47 square kilometres (91.30 sq mi), it is known for its climate and as a strategic settlement between the Pacific Ocean and the central Andes of the country.

The Monumental Zone of Chosica (Spanish: Zona Monumental de Chosica) is the designation under which Chosica's central historic quarter is administered under a special regime that protects its monumental heritage. The area, alongside its monuments, forms part of the cultural heritage of Peru.

== Etymology ==
Chosica's name comes from the Aymara word Cchusica, meaning owl.

== History ==
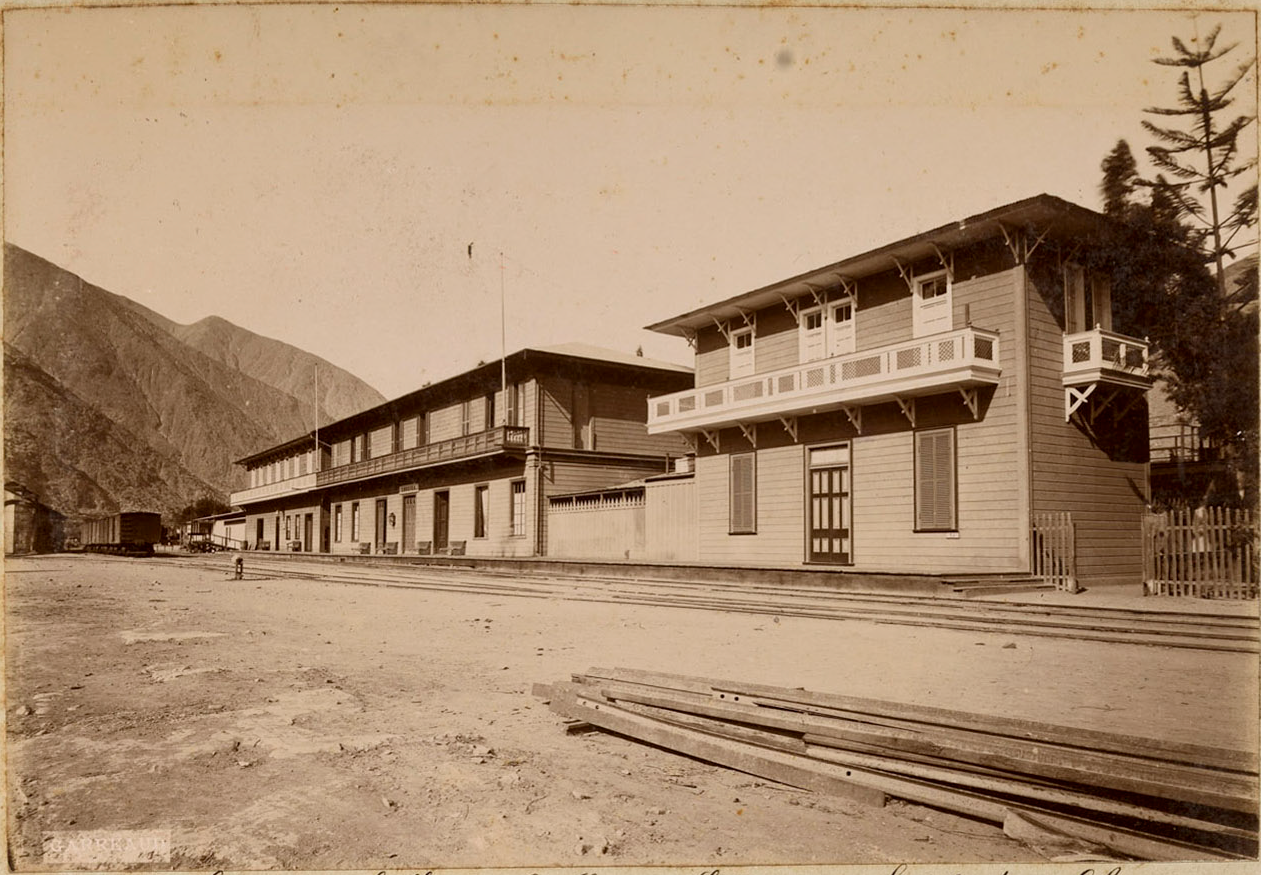
The train station, c. 1900.

Chosica was founded on October 13, 1894, by Emilio Agustin del Solar y Mendiburu (1876–1910), a jurist and a public prosecutor of Lima's Supreme Court. Del Solar also served as member of Lima's Provincial Council and as a lawyer for the Ferrocarril Central del Perú. Local tradition states that Mendiburu suffered from a chronic respiratory illness, due to which he became infatuated with the area, convincing several members of Lima's aristocracy to build countryside villas, whose styles included Gothic Revival, Classical Revival, and Spanish Revival, among others.

On November 9, 1896, it was named by president Nicolás de Piérola as the political capital of Lurigancho District through Law No. 5,446. In 1899, the district's municipal authority moved to the city, later demoted to populated centre.

Its historic quarter was declared a Monumental Zone in 1983. The area is bordered by parts of 28 de Julio, Iquitos, Cusco, Tacna, San José, Arequipa, Trujillo, and Libertad streets.

== Geography ==
Chosica is located at the easternmost part of the district of Lurigancho.

=== Climate ===
Climate data for Chosica
Month	Jan	Feb	Mar	Apr	May	Jun	Jul	Aug	Sep	Oct	Nov	Dec	Year
Mean daily maximum °F	82	82	79	77	72	68	64	64	68	72	77	79	74
Mean daily minimum °F	72	72	68	64	59	55	54	54	55	59	64	68	62
Mean daily maximum °C	28	28	26	25	22	20	18	18	20	22	25	26	23
Mean daily minimum °C	22	22	20	18	15	13	12	12	13	15	18	20	17
Average rainy days	5	6	4	1	0	0	0	0	0	0	1	2	19
Source: SENAMHI

== Demographics ==
According to the Peruvian government's Instituto Nacional de Estadística e Informática, Chosica's population was numbered at 5,445 in 1993.

=== Notable people ===
- Daniel Alomía Robles (1871–1942), composer from Huánuco and author of El Cóndor Pasa
- Alfonso Huapaya Cabrera (1911–2009), former football player and manager

== See also ==
- Santa María de Huachipa
