= 1993 Peruvian census =

The 1993 Peru Census was a detailed enumeration of the Peruvian population made on July 11, 1993, by the Instituto Nacional de Estadística e Informática. Its full name in Spanish is IX Censo de Población y IV de Vivienda ("Ninth Population and Fourth Household Census").

The latest census done by the Peruvian Government is the es:Censo peruano de 2025.

== Population ==
According to this census, the total population in Peru is 22,048,356 inhabitants, 50.3% of which (11,091,981) are female and 49.7% (10,956,375) are male.

=== Departments ===
Department	Persons born in the dept. or abroad	% of country's population
Amazonas	337,421	1.5
Ancash	1,192,942	5.4
Apurímac	550,846	2.5
Arequipa	846,180	3.8
Ayacucho	766,962	3.5
Cajamarca	1,652,073	7.5
Callao	418,261	1.9
Cusco	1,147,713	5.2
Huancavelica	580,892	2.6
Huánuco	729,553	3.3
Ica	595,235	2.7
Junín	1,185,301	5.4
La Libertad	1,320,230	6.0
Lambayeque	915,968	4.2
Lima	4,430,910	20.1
Loreto	742,717	3.4
Madre de Dios	45,655	0.2
Moquegua	114,228	0.5
Pasco	299,749	1.4
Piura	1,568,391	7.1
Puno	1,329,474	6.0
San Martín	474,024	2.1
Tacna	149,838	0.7
Tumbes	136,738	0.6
Ucayali	240,945	1.1
Abroad	52,725	0.2
Unspecified	223,385	1.0
Total	22,048,356	100%

=== Lima Metropolitan Area ===
The Lima Metropolitan Area consists of the cities of Lima and Callao.

Area	Population	% of country's population
Lima Metropolitan Area	6,434,323	28.4

== Languages ==
Spanish is the most spoken language in the country, with 89.5% using it as their first language, while Quechua is spoken at home by 16.5% of the population, 2.3% speak Aymara, 0.7% speak other indigenous languages, and 0.2% speak foreign languages.

== Education ==
The illiteracy rate is 15%.

== See also ==
- Peru Census
- Peru 2005 Census
- Peru 2007 Census
