= Universidad San Ignacio de Loyola =

Private university in Lima, Peru

Saint Ignatius of Loyola University
- Universidad San Ignacio de Loyola (Spanish)
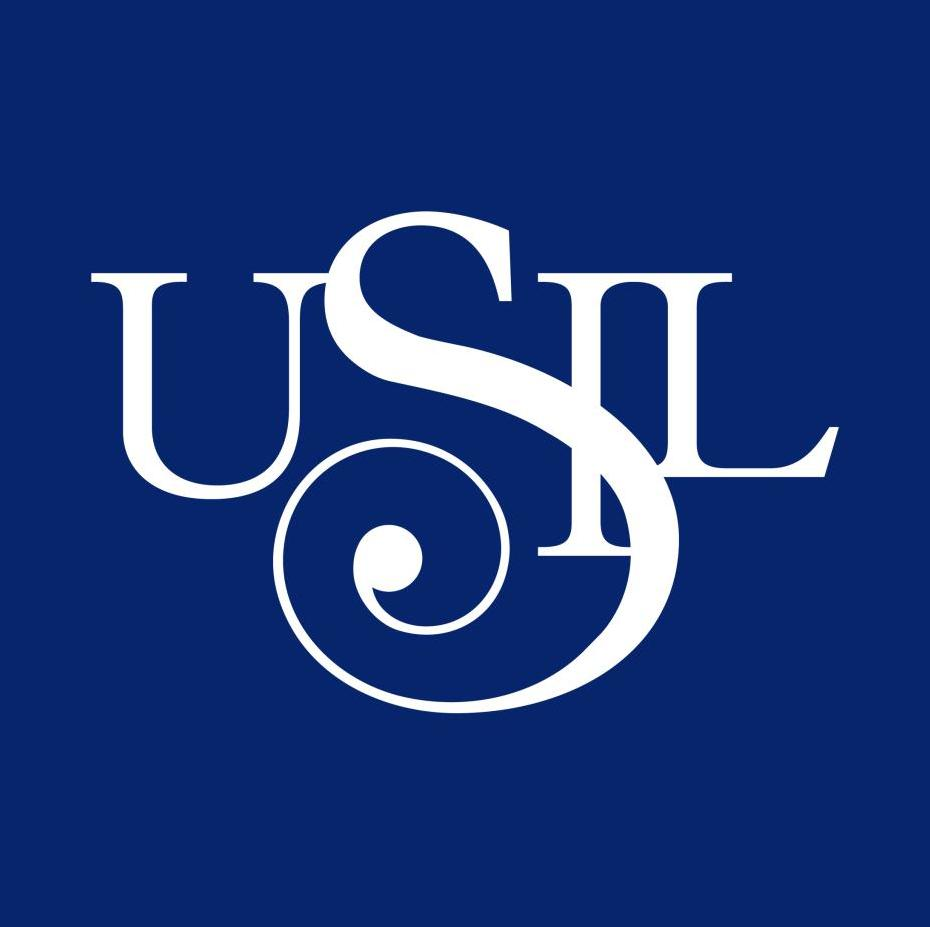
- Motto: Emprendedores que Forman Emprendedores (Spanish)
- Motto in English: Entrepreneurs Educating Entrepreneurs
- Type: Private Research Coeducational Higher education institution
- Established: December 7, 1995; 30 years ago
- Founders: Raúl Diez Canseco Terry
- Affiliations: Corporación Educativa USIL
- Chancellor: Ramiro Salas Bravo
- Rector: Jorge Talavera Traverso
- Students: 18,763 (2018)
- Undergraduates: 18,580
- Postgraduates: 183
- Location: Campus USIL: Av. La Fontana 550, La Molina, Lima, Peru; 12.072536°S 76.951656°W
- Campus: Urban; --Fernando Belaúnde Terry Campus --Miguel Grau Seminario Campus
- Colors: Blue and white
- Nickname: USIL
- Website: usil.edu.pe

St. Ignatius of Loyola University (Spanish: Universidad San Ignacio de Loyola) (USIL) is a private institution for higher education and research in Lima, Peru. It was founded in 1995, as part of the Educational Corporation San Ignacio de Loyola, by Raúl Diez Canseco. The main campus is based in La Molina district. Four decentralized campuses in Pachacamac, Huachipa, Independencia, and Magdalena, provide additional infrastructure for lectures, research, workshops, and sport facilities. Historically, USIL has focused on business, management, and entrepreneurship; however, in recent years, it has expanded significantly in the fields of Education, Engineering and Health Sciences. By 2023, USIL offers 34 undergraduate and 13 postgraduate programmes in 8 faculties.

== History ==
=== 20th century ===
The origin of USIL is the San Ignacio de Loyola Academy, which was founded in 1968. The academy provided training for people that were aiming to sit the general examination for admission into Peruvian universities. Lectures were initially given in the parochial hall of Nuestra Señora de Fatima church in Miraflores, by authorization of José Antonio Eguilior, a priest of the Jesuit order. The support given by the Jesuits would shape important aspects of the institution over the years.

In 1983, the educational corporation expanded and founded the Instituto Superior Tecnológico, a trade school which is no longer part of the corporation.

By the mid-90's, there was a national concern about the limited options to access college education, which led the Peruvian Congress to pass the law DL N°882 to promote private investment in higher education. The new legal framework allowed a financially sustainable project for a new university. In 1995, the National Council for the Authorization of Universities (CONAFU) approved the creation of Saint Ignatius of Loyola University. Lectures started in 1996 for undergraduate programmes focused on Business and Entrepreneurship. The School of Postgraduate Studies was also established in 1996. In 1998, the university founded the School for Chefs "Don Ignacio" and strengthen the hospitality programmes.

=== 21st century ===
At the start of the 21st century, USIL expanded its academic offer. Additionally, it refined its professional training by inaugurating the Restaurant "Don Ignacio" in La Molina and Hotel "La Casa de Don Ignacio" in Cusco as part of the Faculty of Hospitality. In 2009, the university inaugurated a new campus in northern Lima, followed by the Institute for Entrepreneurship. By 2015, USIL expanded to four campuses across Lima. Additionally, the educational corporation developed centres and colleges in Asunción, Miami, and Beijing. In 2017, the National Superintendence of Higher Education (SUNEDU) granted USIL a new functioning license, confirming the fulfilment of the quality standards established by the new education reform. Since 2020, the university has invested significantly in health sciences, including the establishment of the Institute for Food Sciences and Nutrition and a new undergraduate programme of medicine.

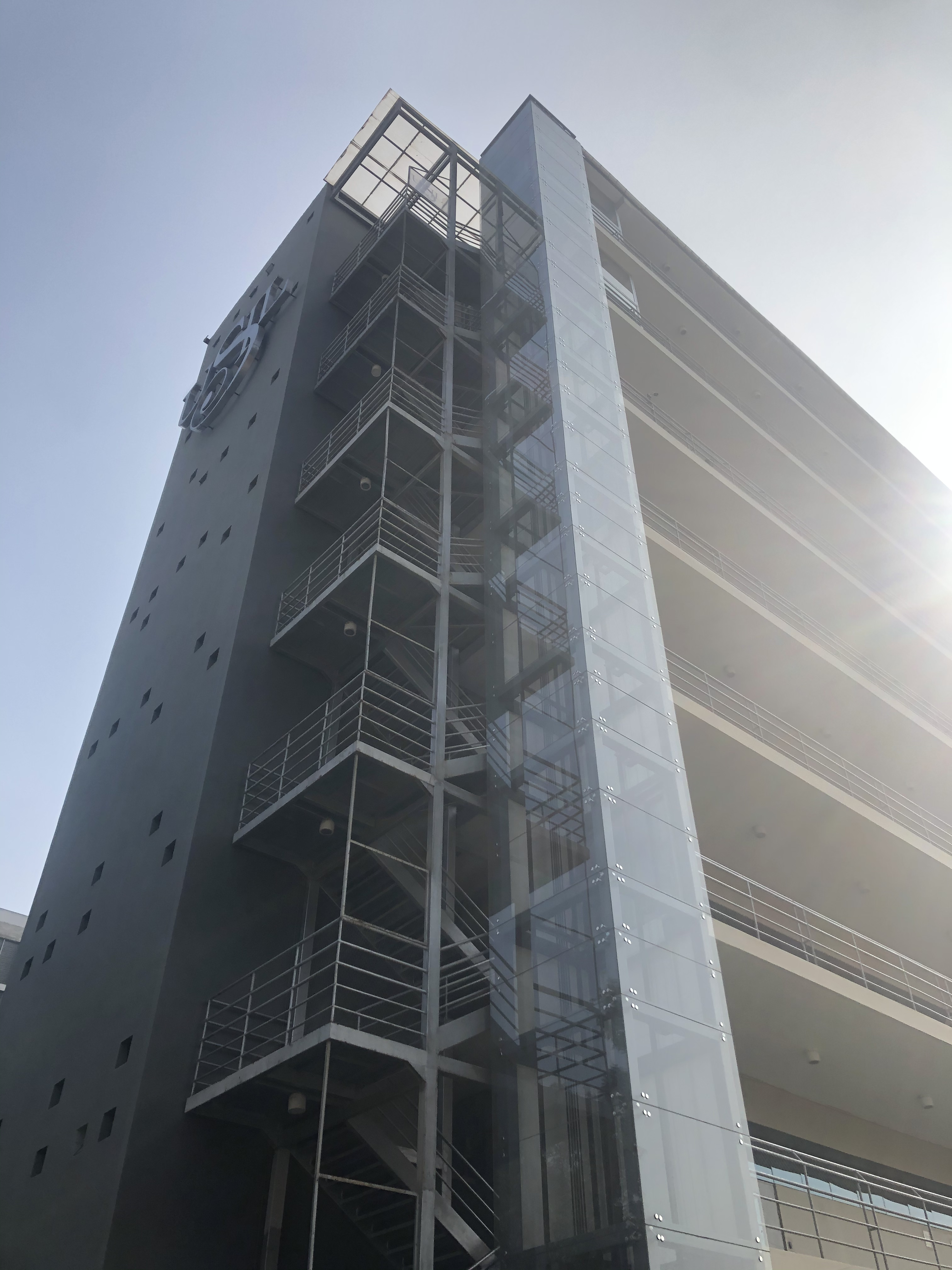
Building - Campus MGS

== Campuses ==
=== La Molina ===
The main campuses are located in the residential district of La Molina, about 16 km from Lima's downtown. The infrastructure cover approximately 3 hectares.

==== Fernando Belaúnde Terry Campus ====
The first campus was built in the mid-1990 and it's named after the former President of Peru, Fernando Belaúnde Terry. It has an extension of 11,100 m^{2}. Nowadays, it provides infrastructure for the Faculty of HTG and the Faculty Health Sciences. Since 2022, Hall A has been undergoing refurnishment works for its repurposement. Scheduled for inauguration in mid-2023, the multimillion investment aims to provide cutting-edge infrastructure for the Health Sciences programmes.

==== Miguel Grau Seminario Campus ====
A second campus in La Molina is named after Miguel Grau Seminario, Peruvian hero in the War of the Pacific. It is based only 200 m away from Fernando Belaunde Terry Campus. It has an extension of 18,600 m^{2}, and provides infrastructure for most faculties, the offices for the School of Postgraduate Studies, the Centre for Global Education and the Chaplaincy. It also provide the venues for most ceremonies and international events.

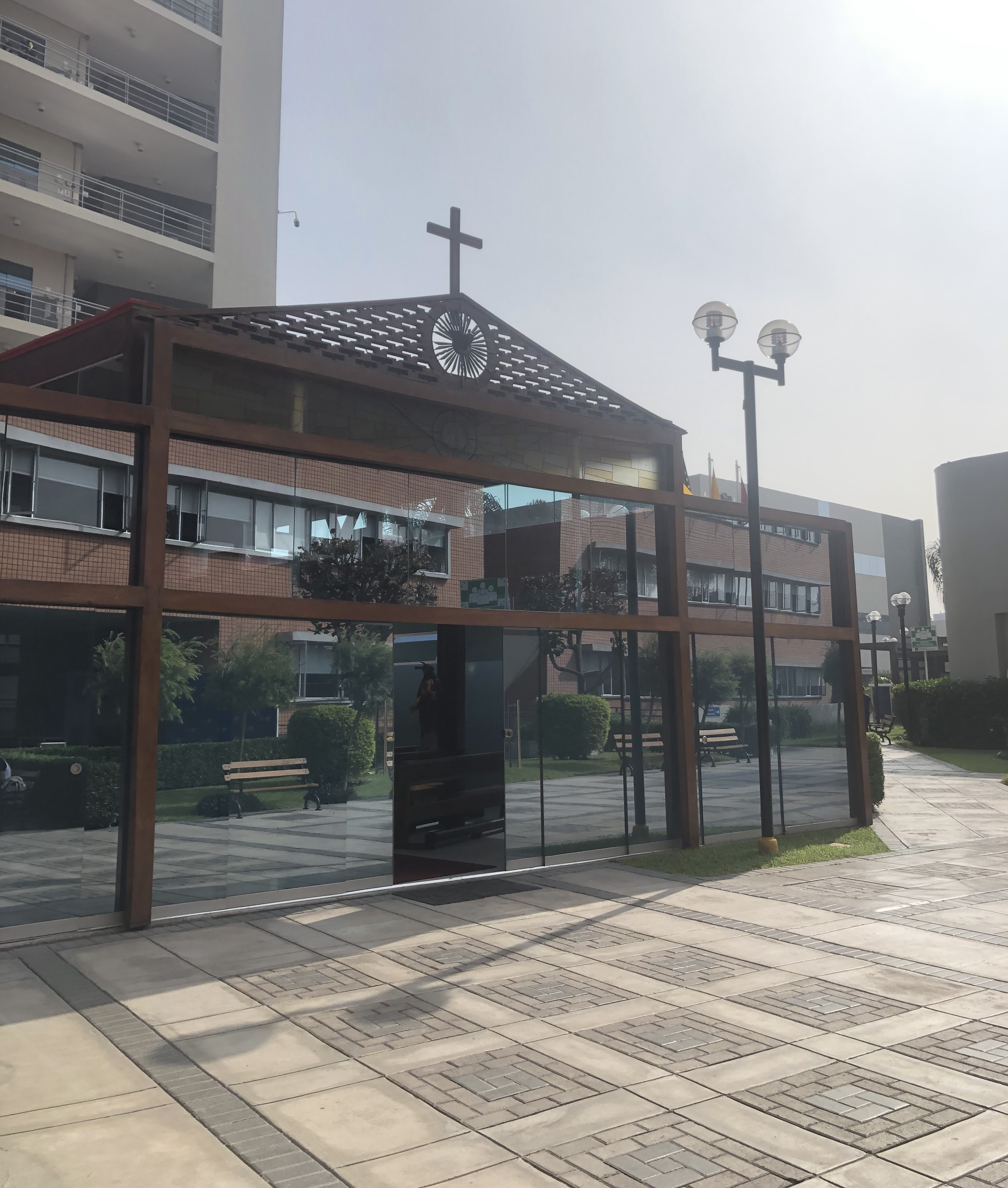
Chaplaincy - Campus MGS

=== Pachacamac ===
The Pachacamac campus has approximately 7 hectares. It is located in Pachacamac district, about 45 km to the south of Lima. It houses multiple laboratories for the Faculty of Engineering, including the Agroindustrial Plant, and the Institute for Food Sciences and Nutrition (ICAN). It is also the main centre for the university's sport facilities.

=== Lima Norte ===
It is located in the district of Independencia. The campus provides the facilities for the CPEL programme, a degree-awarding programme designed for adults with professional experience. The Institute for Entrepreneurship operates partially in this campus.

=== Magdalena ===
The Magdalena Campus, located in the district of Magdalena del Mar, is the base location for the Institute for Entrepreneurship.

=== Auxiliary Campus in Huachipa ===
The Auxiliary Campus in Huachipa, is located in the village Santa María de Huachipa, approximately 30 min from Lima. It has an extension of 2.5 hectares and it is used for sport events, festivals and other general recreation activities for the students and staff.

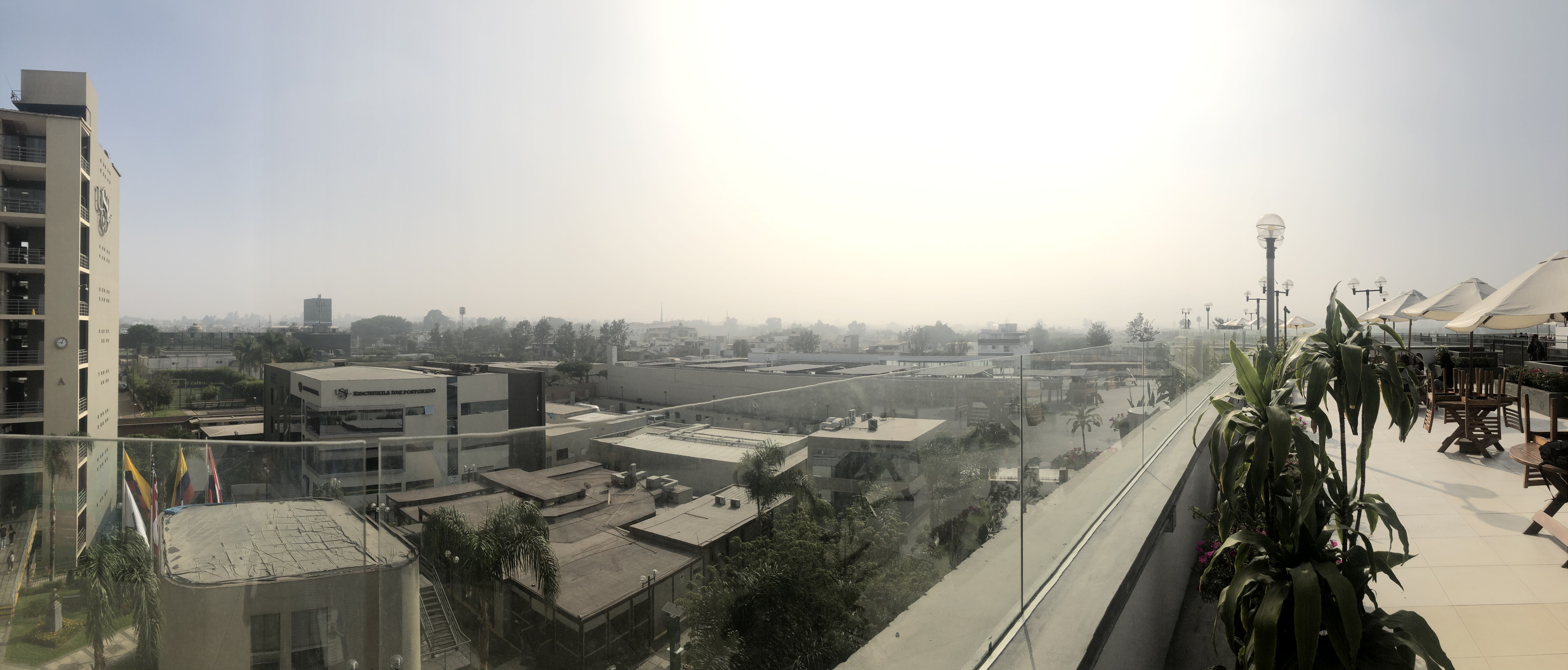
Panoramic view from the roof terrace in Hall C - Campus MGS

== Organisation and administration ==
=== Governance ===
USIL is part of the San Ignacio de Loyola Educational Corporation which operates as the highest administrative body for the university. The corporation is led by the Founder-President Raúl Diez Canseco, the Executive-President Luciana de la Fuente-Carmelino, the Chief Executive Officer Juan Manuel Ostoja, and the Consulting Council comprising ten esteemed members with notable international careers.

The Rector is the most senior academic official and the main representative of the university. Since August 2023, the position is held by Dr. Jorge Talavera Traverso. Additionally, two vice-rectories, dedicated to Academic Affairs and Research respectively, actively contribute to fulfil the university's goals.

=== Faculties and undergraduate programmes ===
==== Faculty of Architecture ====
- Architecture

==== Faculty of Arts and Humanities ====
- Commercial art and design
- Music

==== Faculty of Business ====
- Business Administration
- Business Administration and Entrepreneurship
- Business Administration and Corporative Finance
- Economics
- Economics and Finance
- Economics and International Business
- International Business
- Marketing

==== Faculty of Communications ====
- Communications

==== Faculty of Education ====
- Early Childhood Education
- Secondary Education with specialty in English Language

==== Faculty of Engineering ====
- Agroindustrial Engineering
- Data Science
- Industrial and Commercial Engineering
- Systems Engineering and Information
- Civil Engineering
- Business Engineering
- Food Industrial Engineering
- Logistics and Transport Engineering
- Environmental Engineering
- Mechanical Engineering

==== Faculty of Health Sciences ====
- Physical Activity and Sports Sciences
- Nutrition and Dietetics
- Medicine
- Psychology

==== Faculty of Hospitality Management, Tourism and Gastronomy ====
- Culinary Arts
- Hospitality Management
- Management and Tourism
- Management and Innovation in Gastronomy

==== Faculty of Law ====
- Law
- International Relations

=== Academic Centres ===
==== Center for Global Education ====
USIL houses the Center for Global Education, which offers a unique programme that allow students to begin their bachelor studies in Lima and complete them at prestigious universities in Australia, Canada, the UK, or the USA.

==== Center for Language Studies ====
The Center for Language Studies provides to the college community the necessary infrastructure and learning programmes for English, Italian, French, German, Portuguese, Japanese, Chinese, and Spanish.

== Academic profile ==
=== Rankings ===
USIL has had a steady improvement in international rankings. According to the QS ranking, USIL has remained within the top 10 peruvian universities for the past few years. In the Latin-America region, USIL moved from the 301-400 position in 2018 to 201-250 position in 2024.

Academic Rankings
National ranking
| ARWU (2020) | — |
| Webometrics (2023) | 10 |
| URAP (2021) | — |
| SCImago (2023) | 2 |
| QS National (2024) | 8 |
| THE National (2022) | 5 |

== Notable alumni, faculty and staff ==
- Carlo Angeles - Activist, Member of Lima Metropolitan Council
- Raúl Diez Canseco - Founder and President of the Board, Former Vice-president of Peru
- Carlos Boloña - First Rector (1995-2000) and Former Minister of Economy and Finance
- Lourdes Flores Nano - Former Rector (2006-2009), Politician, Former Congresswoman and Former Leader of the Christian People's Party
- Ana María Muñoz - Former Rector (2022-2023)
