= BLX =

BLX may refer to:

- Bloxwich railway station (National Rail station code BLX)
- Belluno Airport (IATA code BLX)
- TUIfly Nordic airline (ICAO code BLX)
- Banco Latinoamericano de Comercio Exterior
