= Uhle =

Uhle is a surname. Notable people with the surname include:

- Claudia Uhle (born 1976), German singer
- George Uhle (1898–1985), American Major League Baseball pitcher
- Johann Paul Uhle (1827–1861), German physician and pathologist
- Karl Uhle (1887–1969), German football player
- Max Uhle (1856–1944), German archaeologist
- Wolfgang Uhle (1512–1594), German Lutheran priest

== See also ==
- Ule, a German surname
- Colegio Max Uhle, German international school in Arequipa, Peru
