= Ana María Muñoz =

Peruvian pharmacist

Ana María Muñoz Jáuregui
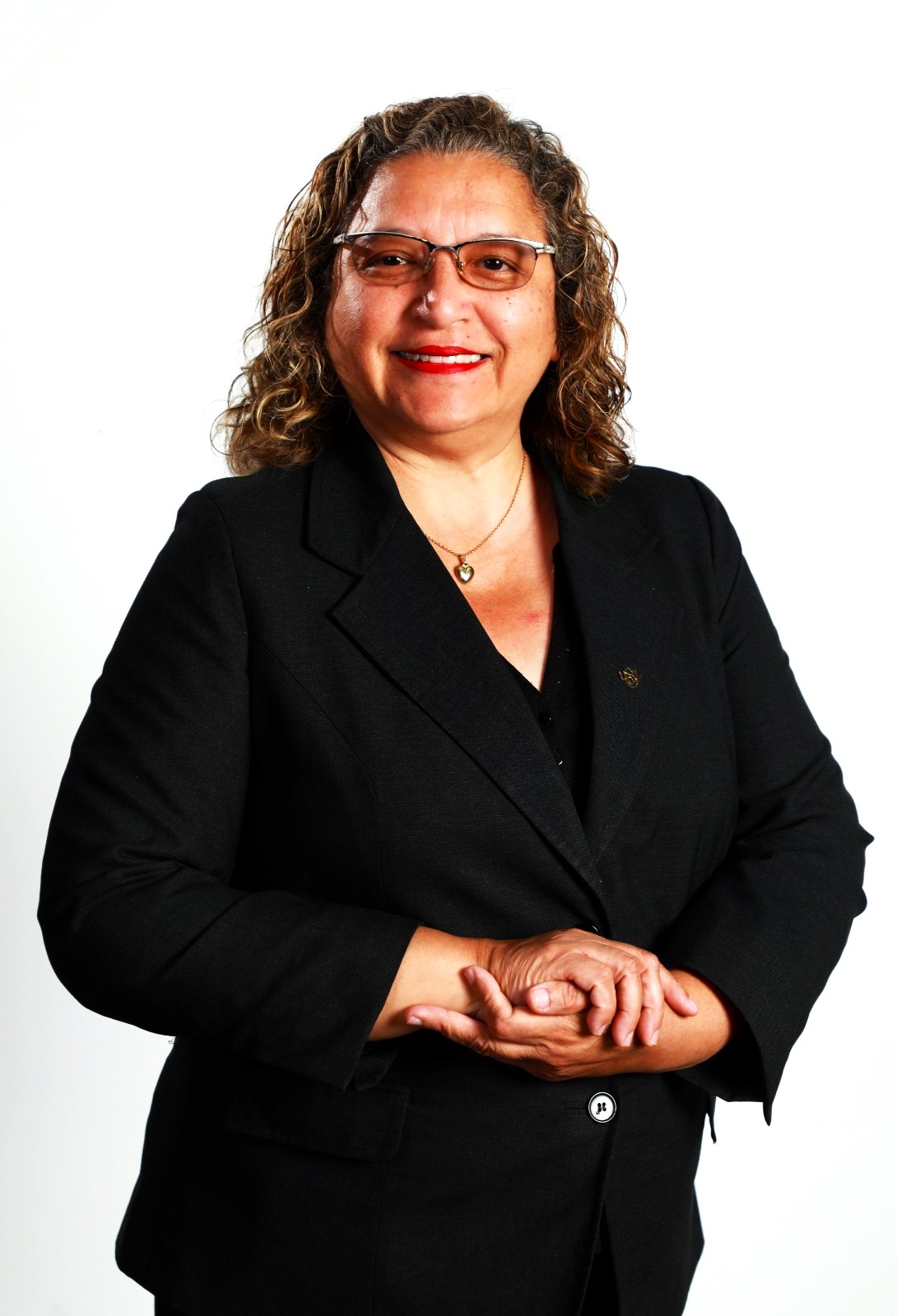
- Born: 1969 (age 56–57); Lima, Peru
- Education: National University of San Marcos; San Martín de Porres University
- Scientific career
- Fields: Pharmaceutical; Nutrition; Biochemistry
- Workplaces: San Ignacio de Loyola University (Rector and Vice-rector); National University of San Marcos (Professor and researcher); San Martín de Porres University (Professor); Cayetano Heredia University (Professor)

Ana María Muñoz Jauregui (born 1969, Lima) is a Peruvian pharmacist, biochemist and nutritionist. She has served as Rector and, since 2023, as the Vice Rector of research at San Ignacio de Loyola University (USIL).

Muñoz has authored numerous publications and received national and international awards, such as silver, gold medals and semi-grand prize wins at the International KIWIE Award.

== Early years and education ==
Muñoz, was born in Lima, Peru. In 1996, she attended the National University of San Marcos (UNMSM), where she earned her pharmaceutical degree. While studying, she developed an interest in the field of nutrition.

She earned a master's degree in biochemistry and nutrition, and earned a PhD in Pharmacy and Biochemistry from the National University of San Marcos (UNMSM) in 2006.

== Career ==
She began working as a biochemistry and nutrition professor at the University of San Martín de Porres in 2001.

Many of her research projects have been financed by CONCYTEC. She was a member of the Advisory Committee of the School of Food Science from 2011 to 2013, and served as an undergraduate and postgraduate professor at UNMSM. Additionally, she taught at University of San Martín de Porres from 1998 to 2013 and at Cayetano Heredia University School of Pharmacy and Biochemistry from 2014 to 2015. From 2012 to 2016, Muñoz's investigative research and projects, were subsidized by her alma mater, UNMSM.

As part of her academic growth, she has participated in congresses by a variety of institutions, including the Latin American Society of Nutrition, Chemical Society of Peru and Peruvian Society of Nutrition, of which she is a member. She was previously the President of the Chemical Society of Peru Magazine and has served as President of the Consultative Committee Hipolito Unanue Foundation since 2023. She was the Rector of San Ignacio de Loyola University (USIL) from 2022 to 2023. Previously, she was the Dean of Health Sciences at USIL from 2016 to 2017. Since 2023 she has been the Vice Rector of Research at USIL.

She published her first book, Estudio químico-bromatológico del fruto Carica monoica desf., through Editorial Académica Española in 2012. She was a co-author of the 2020 book Nutrición e Inmunidad: salud en los tiempos de COVID-19.

== Works ==
- Muñoz Jáuregui, Ana María; Ganoza, Fernando; Encina, Christian (2012). Estudio químico-bromatológico del fruto Carica monoica desf [Chemistry-Bromatological Study of the fruit Carica monoica desf.] (in Spanish) (1st ed.). Lima: Editorial Académica Española. ISBN 978-3-659-01660-8.
- In 2017, she was part of the publication team of the book, "Peru, Flavor & Knowledge. Fundamentals and Methods of Peruvian Cooking". which is related to peruvian cuisine.
- De la Fuente de Diez Canseco, Luciana; Muñoz Jáuregui, Ana María; Valdizán Ayala, José; Gómez Mendoza, José; Portugal Melgar, Alan; Cárdenas Jarama, Martín; Cuya Alvarado, Shirley (September 2019). Alcachofa: El corazón del sabor [Alcachofa: The heart of flavor]. San Ignacio de Loyola University. ISBN 978-612-4370-46-5.
- Muñoz Jáuregui, Ana María; Gómez Mendoza, José; Ignacio Cconchoy, Felipe; Barriga Rodríguez, Dayana; Portugal Melgar, Alan; Baquerizo Sedano, Luis (August 2020). Nutrición e inmunidad: salud en tiempos del COVID-19 [Nutrition and immunity: Health in the time of COVID-19]. San Ignacio de Loyola University. ISBN 978-612-4370-58-8.

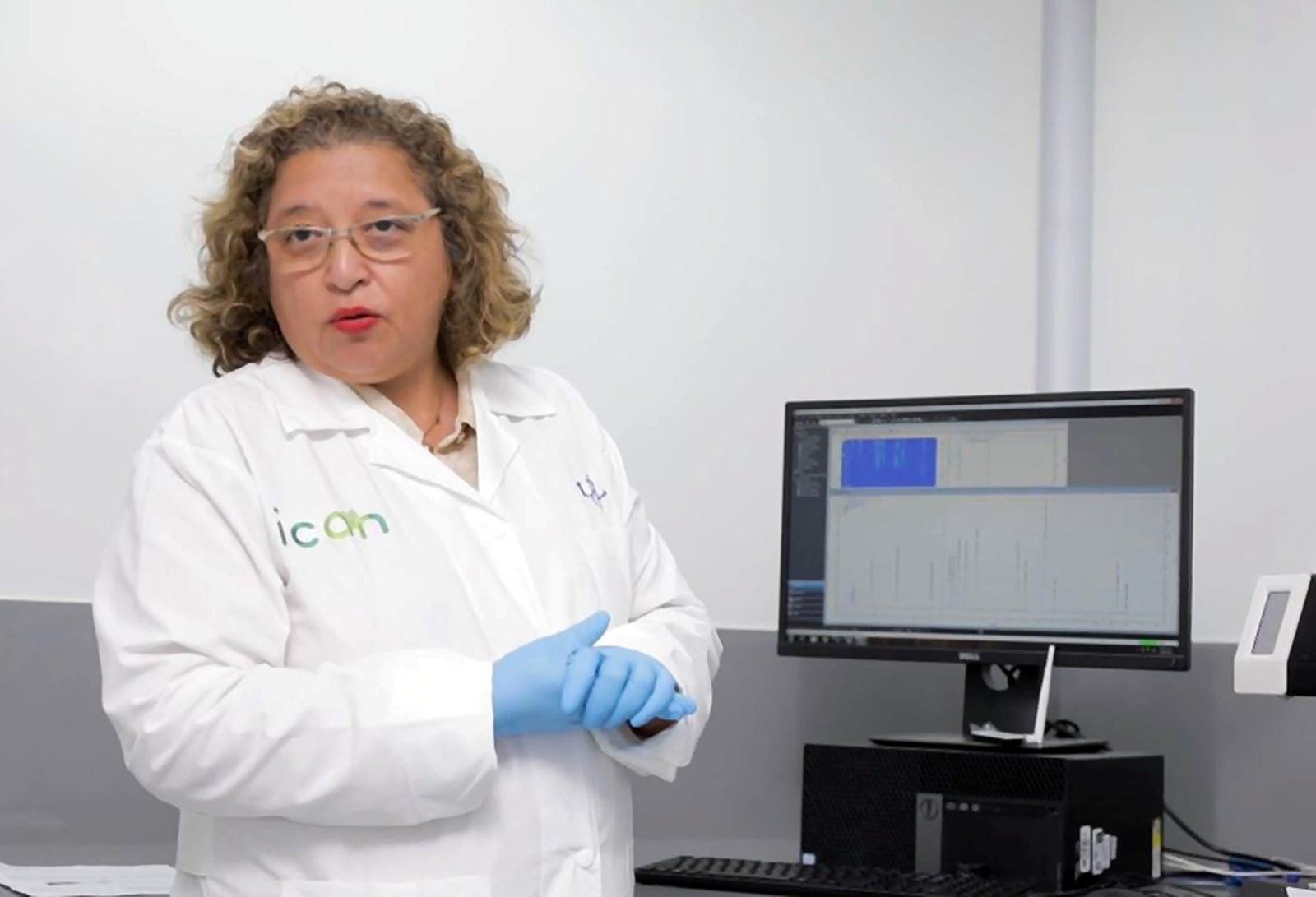
Dr. Ana Muñoz Jauregui performing liquid chromatography analysis to quantify phenolic compounds in food. Lima, Peru.

== Inventions ==
In 2023, she and an investigative team created a "Floor and small surface cleaner formula without water in its formulation presented in fast dissolving crystals with antibacterial effect" as well as "Compact powder Compact powder soap that dissolves quickly in the time necessary to ensure hand cleaning with moisturizing effect" those inventions were recognized by International Invention and Innovation Competition in Canada (iCAN).

Her most awarded invention is the "Emulsion type cosmetic cream for face and body with moisturizing effect formulated with sinami (Oenocorpus mapora H. Karst)". This patent was created in collaboration with Dr. Luciana de la Fuente Carmelino and Mg. Juana Patricia Lozada Huancachoque, and it received the golden medals at the KIWIE Awards in 2024. Their others two inventions, that received this award, were "Formula and application method for the cleaning of cloudiness generated by weathering in glass containers" and "Toothpaste in tablet form free of water in its formulation with essential oils as antimicrobial active ingredients".

== Awards ==
- Silver medal, 2022 International KIWIE Award
- Silver medal, 2023 International KIWIE Award.
- Women Inventor Award, INDECOPI.
- Top 10 iCAN Award, from Canada for her ongoing projects.
- Hipolito Unanue Institute Fountation Award, Best Scientific Research Work for the study "Frequency of CYP1A1*2A and deletion of the GSTM1 gene in the Peruvian mestizo population".
- Three gold medals, 2024 International KIWIE Awards
