= 2017 Peruvian census =

Twelfth census of Peru
- October 22, 2017
- INEI Logo

General information
- Country: Republic of Peru
- Authority: Instituto Nacional de Estadística e Informática
- Website: censo2017.inei.gob.pe

Results
- Total population: 31,237,385 (▲10.7%)
- Most populous region: Lima (9,485,405)
- Least populous region: Madre de Dios (141,070)

The 2017 Peru census (Spanish XII Censo de Población, VII de Vivienda y III de Comunidades Indígenas) was the twelfth national population census of Peru conducted by the Instituto Nacional de Estadística e Informática from Sunday, 22 October to 5 November 2017. The total population of the Republic of Peru, was counted as 31,237,385, an increase of 10.7% or 2,068,499 people over the previous 2007 census.

Peru's next census is scheduled to take place from August to October 2025.

== Questions ==
The census form had 47 questions referring to households and basic services, housing, methods of travel and formation of families; such as gender, disability and ethnicity. A question on ethnic self-identification was included in the 2017 census.

== Results ==
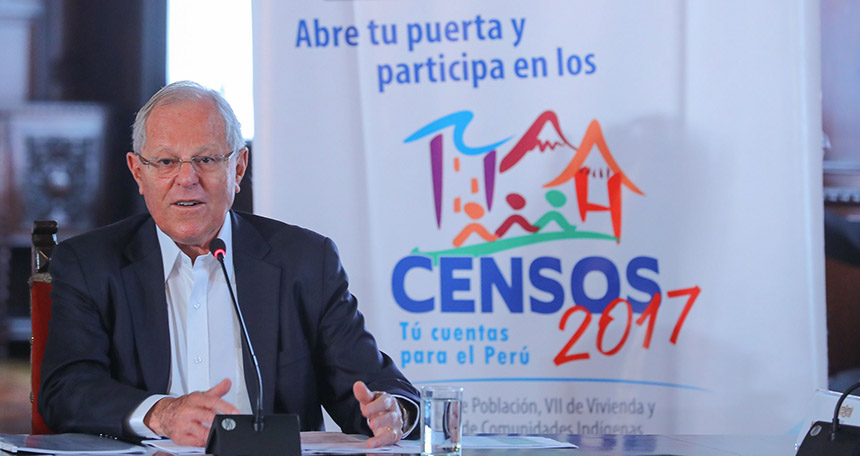
President of Peru Pedro Pablo Kuczynski inviting the population to participate in the 2017 census.

=== Population ===
Comparison between the 2007 and 2017 census.

Population by region
Region		Population Censed 2007 / %		Total Population 2007	Population Censed 2017 / %		Population Change / %		Total Population 2017
(Lima)	Lima	8,442,409	30.80%	TBD	9,485,405	32.28% ▲	1,042,996 ▲	12.35% ▲	TBD
	Piura	1,676,315	6.12%	TBD	1,856,809	6.32% ▲	180,494 ▲	10.77% ▲	TBD
	La Libertad	1,617,050	5.90%	TBD	1,778,080	6.05% ▲	161,030 ▲	9.96% ▲	TBD
(Arequipa)	Arequipa	1,152,303	4.20%	TBD	1,382,730	4.71% ▲	230,427 ▲	19.99% ▲	TBD
	Cajamarca	1,387,809	5.06%	TBD	1,341,012	4.56% ▼	−46,797 ▼	-3.37% ▼	TBD
Junin	Junín	1,225,474	4.47%	TBD	1,246,038	4.24% ▼	20,564 ▲	1.68% ▲	TBD
	Cusco	1,171,403	4.27%	TBD	1,205,527	4.10% ▼	34,124 ▲	2.91% ▲	TBD
Lambayeque Department	Lambayeque	1,112,868	4.06%	TBD	1,197,260	4.08 ▲	84,392 ▲	7.58% ▲	TBD
	Puno	1,268,441	4.63%	TBD	1,172,697	3.99% ▼	−95,744▼	-7.55% ▼	TBD
	Ancash	1,063,459	3.88%	TBD	1,083,519	3.69% ▼	20,060 ▲	1.89% ▲	TBD
	Callao	879,679	3.21%	TBD	994,494	3.38% ▲	114,815 ▲	13.05% ▲	TBD
	Loreto	891,732	3.25%	TBD	883,510	3.00% ▼	−8,222 ▼	-0.92% ▼	TBD
	Ica	711,932	2.60%	TBD	850,765	2.90% ▲	138,833 ▲	19.50% ▲	TBD
	San Martín	728,808	2.66%	TBD	813,381	2.77% ▲	84,573▲	11.60% ▲	TBD
	Huánuco	762,223	2.78%	TBD	721,047	2.45% ▼	−41,176 ▼	-5.40% ▼	TBD
	Ayacucho	612,489	2.23%	TBD	616,176	2.10% ▼	3,687 ▲	0.60% ▲	TBD
	Ucayali	432,159	1.58%	TBD	496,459	1.70% ▲	64,300 ▲	14.88% ▲	TBD
	Apurímac	404,190	1.47%	TBD	405,759	1.38% ▼	1,569 ▲	0.39% ▲	TBD
	Amazonas	375,993	1.37%	TBD	379,384	1.29% ▼	3,391 ▲	0.90% ▲	TBD
	Huancavelica	454,797	1.66%	TBD	347,639	1.18% ▼	−107,158 ▼	-23.56% ▼	TBD
	Tacna	288,781	1.05%	TBD	329,332	1.12% ▲	40,551 ▲	14.04% ▲	TBD
Pasco Department	Pasco	280,449	1.02%	TBD	254,065	0.86% ▼	−26,384 ▼	-9.41% ▼	TBD
	Tumbes	200,306	0.73%	TBD	224,863	0.76% ▲	24,557 ▲	12.26% ▲	TBD
	Moquegua	161,533	0.59%	TBD	174,863	0.60% ▲	13,330 ▲	8.25% ▲	TBD
Madre de Dios Department	Madre de Dios	109,555	0.40%	TBD	141,070	0.48% ▲	31,515 ▲	28.77% ▲	TBD
(Peru)	Peru	27,412,157	100%	28,220,764	29,381,884	100%	1,969,727 ▲	7.19% ▲	31,237,385

== Ethnic group and religion ==
=== Self-identified ethnicity ===
Responses are for the population of 12 years old and above.

Ethnic group	Population	%
Mestizo	13,965,254	60.2
Quechua	5,176,809	22.3
White	1,366,931	5.9
Afro-descendant	828,841	3.6
Aymara	548,292	2.4
Native or indigenous to the Amazon	79,266	0.3
Asháninka	55,489	0.2
Part of another Indigenous	49,838	0.2
Aguaruna/Awajún	37,690	0.2
Shipibo-Conibo/Konibo	25,222	0.1
Japanese (Nikkei)	22,534	0.1
Chinese (Tusan)	14,307	0.1
Other	254,892	1.1
Don't know / no response	771,026	3.3
Total	23,196,391	100.0
Source:INEI

=== Religion ===
Distribution of religious denominations.

Religion	Population / %		Change 2007-2017
Catholic	17,635,339	76.0	▲4.0%
Evangelical	3,264,819	14.1	▲25.3%
Total, other	1,115,872	4.8	▲64.3%
Christian	381,031	1.64	-
Adventists	353,430	1.52	-
Jehovah's Witnesses	173,602	0.75	-
Mormon	113,659	0.49	-
Other	94,150	0.41	-
None	1,180,361	5.1	▲94.0%
Total	23,196,391	100.0	▲11.3%

Note: ‘Other’ religions such as Buddhist, Hindu, Islam.

== See also ==
- Instituto Nacional de Estadística e Informática (INEI)
- Census in Peru
- 1993 Peru Census
- 2005 Peru Census
- 2007 Peru Census
