= San Juan de Lurigancho =

District in Lima, Peru

- District
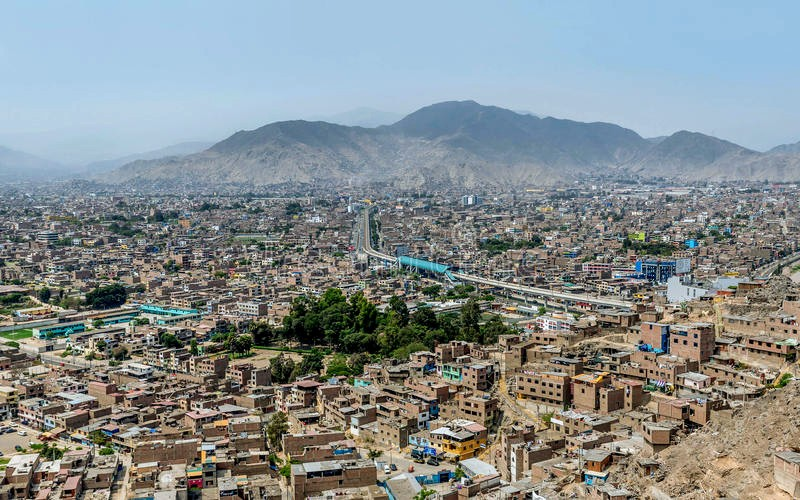

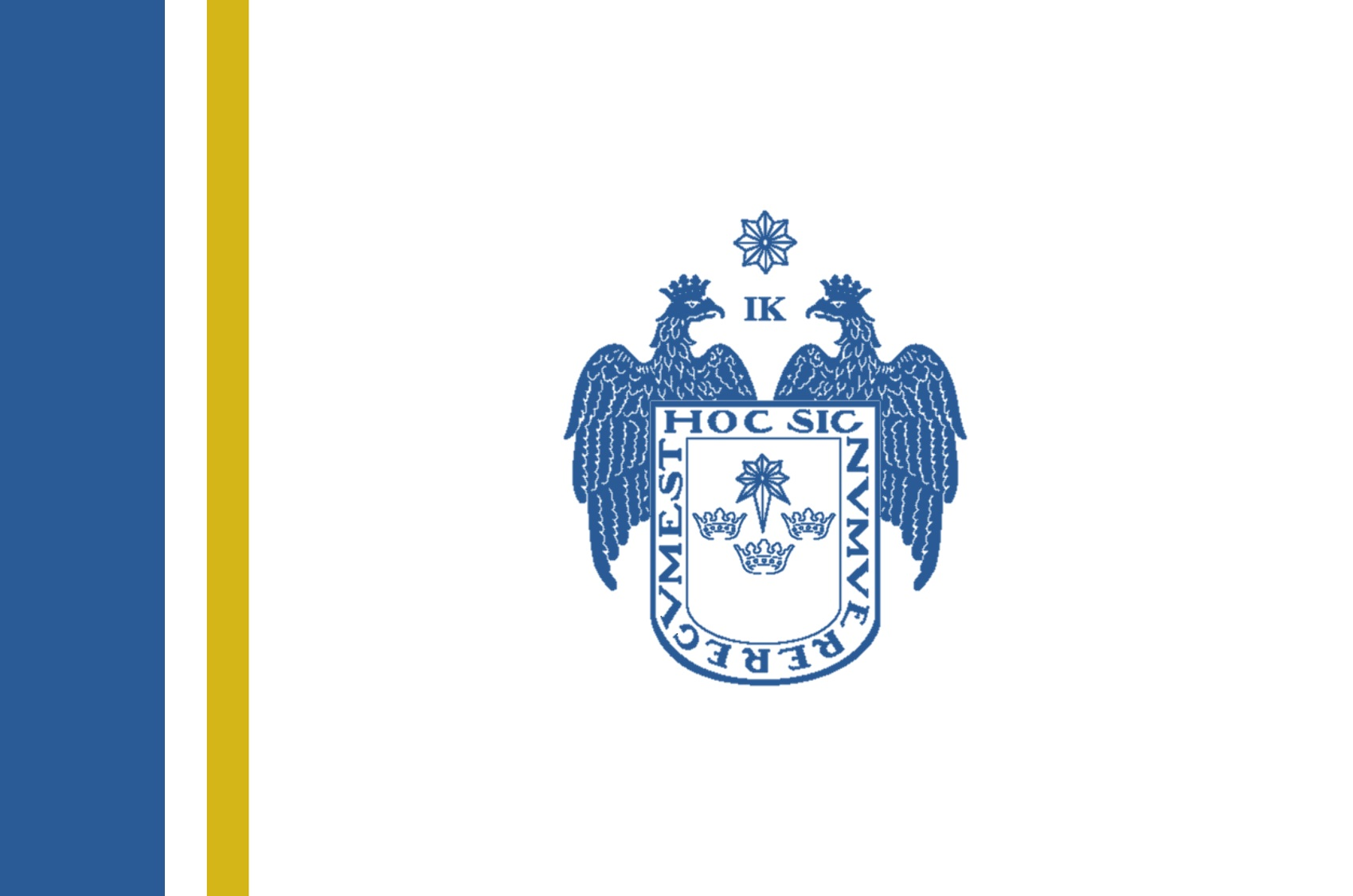
- Flag

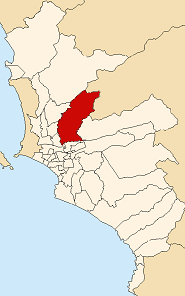
- Location of San Juan de Lurigancho in Lima
- Coordinates: 12°02′S 77°01′W
- Country: Peru
- Region: Lima
- Province: Lima
- Founded: January 13, 1967
- Capital: San Juan de Lurigancho

Government
  - Mayor: Jesús Maldonado (2023-2026)

Area
  - Total: 131.25 km^{2} (50.68 sq mi)
- Elevation: 220 m (720 ft)

Population (2023)
  - Total: 1,240,489
  - Density: 9,451.3/km^{2} (24,479/sq mi)
- Time zone: UTC-5 (PET)
- UBIGEO: 150132
- Website: web.munisjl.gob.pe

San Juan de Lurigancho (SJL) is a district in Lima, Peru, located in the area known as Cono Este. It is Peru's most populous district, with a current population that may exceed one million.

The most important urban areas in the district are Mangomarca, Zárate, Las Flores de Lima, Canto Grande and Bayovar. One of the first urban areas in San Juan de Lurigancho is Caja de Agua, which is located at the entrance of the district, and the northern entrance to the district is the Quebrada Canto Grande y Media Luna. Caja de Agua is surrounded by San Cristobal (south side) and Santa Rosa hills from south to west and by Gramal hill on the north side. The Próceres de la Independencia Avenue separates Caja de Agua from Zárate. Caja de Agua is the seat of the Police Station located in Avenida Lima. A large and convenient market is found in Avenida Lima; "Mercado Modelo de Caja de Agua" which offers value for money products. Another market is "El Bosque". Also, Caja de Agua contains 3 local state schools which are in a very poor conditions, on the brink of being abandoned and closed due to the lack of students; these are "Javier Heraud"; Jíron Arequipa. "Cesar Vallejo'; Jíron Amazonas and "Tomas Alva Edison"; which is located next to the market "El Bosque".

== Etymology ==
The district's name has two origins. "San Juan" comes from "San Juan Bautista," a reduction founded in the 1570s by the Spanish, who named it after Saint John the Baptist. A reduction was a population centre in which dispersed Indians were grouped together for the purposes of evangelisation and cultural assimilation. "Lurigancho" is a name with two possible origins. It is either the changed name of a pre-Columbian culture (Ruricancho), or taken from Hurin Huancho (lit. 'Huancho of the Valley'), a term used to describe the Huancho, an ethnic group that established a cacicazgo of the same name. It is also known simply by the acronym SJL.

The latter part of its name has often caused confusion with that of Lurigancho District, of which it was part until 1967. This has led to a workaround where the term is usually associated with San Juan de Lurigancho, while Lurigancho is usually referred to as "Lurigancho-Chosica" or "Chosica" after its political capital.

== Geography ==
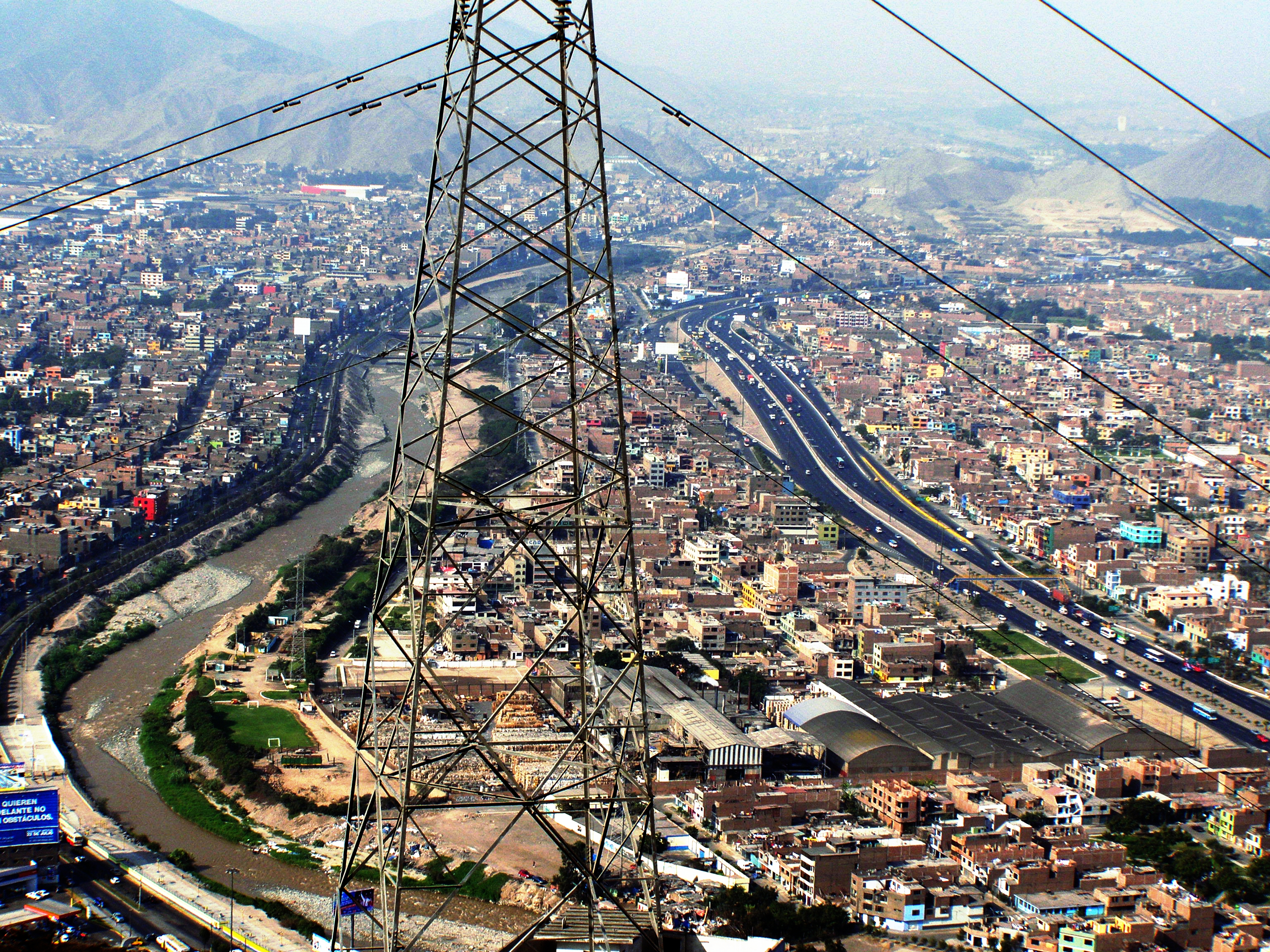
San Juan de Lurigancho

On the north, it is bordered by the districts of Carabayllo and Huarochirí Province. San Juan de Lurigancho is bordered by Comas, Independencia and Rímac on the west; and Lurigancho-Chosica on the east. The Rímac River marks the district's border with downtown Lima and El Agustino on the south.

=== Boundaries ===
- North: Carabayllo and Huarochirí Province.
- East: Huarochirí Province and Lurigancho-Chosica.
- South: El Agustino and Lima.
- West: Rímac, Independencia and Comas.

== Climate ==
The summers tend to be rather dry. Summer is from October to April. May to September is a cold season. It seldom rains in this area, though the proximity to the coast brings cold humidity and fog in the winter.

== Demographics ==
As of the 2017 census, the district San Juan de Lurigancho has a population of approximately 1,038,495, the largest of Lima in terms of population.

== Transportation ==
San Juan de Lurigancho is serviced by many bus routes that connect it with almost all the other districts in Lima.

The main route that connects San Juan de Lurigancho with the rest of the Lima and Callao Metropolitan Area is the Próceres de la Independencia Avenue, Consisting of 74 blocks. The Puente Nuevo, or New Bridge (actually a combination of two bridges with traffic going in opposite directions), inaugurated in 1993, provided a long-needed direct link to El Agustino and points south and east. Finally, the Lima Metro connects the district with the rest of Lima.

Another important transportation link, a tunnel that will connect the districts of San Juan de Lurigancho with Rimac, has been halted. This tunnel is called Santa Rosa and San Martin, and was built up to 60% of its length but perforation of the tunnel was stopped due to some faults in the hill that was being excavated in March 2012. As of January 2014, construction has not resumed.

== Security ==
War against mafias

The mayor of San Juan de Lurigancho, Álex Gonzales Castillo, told La República that distrust, fear, irritability, restlessness and helplessness had become some of the most common psychological characteristics of the inhabitants of that district.

He specified, however, that in nine months of administration, San Juan de Lurigancho has ceased to be the first district with the highest crime and violence in the country. "War has been declared on corruption and organized gangs, mafias and criminal gangs," he stated.

Threats do not stop General (r) Eduardo Arteta, SJL citizen security manager, who notes with concern that "The mafias dedicated to drug trafficking and prostitution have threatened to kill the mayor.” He explained that he has established a neighborhood intelligence network, with active participation from the community, which will improve levels of security.

“The community has been sensitized in support tasks for the PNP and the security forces, through the formation of High Risk Units (200 neighbors in each community area)”

Regarding police personnel who perform patrol functions, San Juan de Lurigancho has a deficit of 495 officers. Thus, the problem continues.

== See also ==
- Administrative divisions of Peru
