= 2005 Peruvian census =

Census of Peru in 2005

Logo of the Peru 2005 census performed by INEI

The 2005 Peru Census was a detailed enumeration of the Peruvian population. It was conducted by the Instituto Nacional de Estadística e Informática from July 18 through August 20, 2005. Its full name in Spanish is X Censo de Población y V de Vivienda ("Tenth Population and Fifth Household Census"). The previous census performed in Peru was the 1993 Census. The following census was the 2007 Census.

The results of the census were released to the public on November 30, 2005, after all the census materials from the country's 25 regions were transported to Arequipa and processed at the INEI information processing center in that city.

== Results ==
The total population of Peru is 26,152,265 inhabitants. The following table shows a breakdown of the total population per region and the Lima Province.

Region	Population	% of country's population	Change in population since 1993	Change in % of country's population since 1993
Amazonas	389,700	1.5	52,279	0.0
Ancash	1,039,415	4.0	-153,527	-1.4
Apurimac	418,882	1.6	-131,964	-0.9
Arequipa	1,140,810	4.4	294,630	0.6
Ayacucho	619,338	2.4	-147,624	-1.1
Cajamarca	1,359,023	5.2	-293,050	-2.3
Callao	810,568	3.1	392,307	1.2
Cusco	1,171,503	4.5	23,790	-0.7
Huancavelica	447,054	1.7	-133,838	-0.9
Huanuco	730,871	2.8	1,318	-0.5
Ica	665,592	2.5	70,357	-0.2
Junin	1,091,619	4.2	-93,682	-1.8
La Libertad	1,539,774	5.9	219,544	-0.1
Lambayeque	1,091,535	4.2	175,567	0.0
Lima Region	864,853	3.3	3,388,526	9.8
Lima Province	6,954,583	26.6	3,388,526	9.8
Loreto	884,144	3.4	141,427	0.0
Madre de Dios	92,024	0.4	46,369	0.2
Moquegua	159,306	0.6	45,078	0.1
Pasco	266,764	1.0	-32,985	-0.4
Piura	1,630,772	6.2	62,381	-0.9
Puno	1,245,508	4.8	-83,966	-1.2
San Martin	669,973	2.6	195,949	0.5
Tacna	274,496	1.0	124,658	0.3
Tumbes	191,713	0.7	54,975	0.1
Ucayali	402,445	1.5	161,500	0.4
Total	26,152,265	100%	4,103,909	n.a.

== See also ==
- Peru Census
