= Populated centres of Peru =

Fourth-level administrative subdivisions

The populated centres of Peru (Spanish: Centros poblados; CC.PP.), are the fourth-level administrative subdivisions and the lowest administrative subdivision of the country. They are subdivisions of the districts, which in turn are subdivisions of provinces, which in turn are subdivisions of the regions. As of 2022, there are 2,859 populated centers in total, which are administered by municipalities headed by a mayor elected every four years.

== Overview ==
This form of constituency was created by Law 23853, published on June 9, 1984, and amended by Law 23854 (published the same day), which established the change in the name from Delegated Municipality to Minor Populated Centre Municipality. This latter name only lasted until the publication of the Political Constitution of 1993, on December 29, which in its article 191 established that the provincial and district municipalities, and those delegated in accordance with the law, are the bodies of local government.

Delegated Municipalities are created by Provincial Municipalities and are governed by the provincial ordinance that establishes them, which establishes the functions delegated to them. For a delegated municipality to be created, a hamlet (Spanish: caserío), rural community (Spanish: comunidad campesina), or native community (Spanish: comunidad nativa) must meet certain requirements:

- Population: More than 500 citizens over the age of 18.
- Territory: A geographical area to be administered: a hamlet, rural community, or native community.
- Government: An administrative body (to be created by the Provincial Municipality)

In the case of native communities, they were legally recognized in 1974, which applies to the jungle region.

The electoral process in a populated centre is carried out by call from the Provincial Municipality, which announces the process at least 120 days before the start of the process, or 90 days after the creation of the populated centre in the case of a new one. This process is carried out with the mandatory logistical support of the National Office of Electoral Processes and the optional oversight of the Provincial Municipality and the National Jury of Elections.

=== Census ===
Peru's Instituto Nacional de Estadística e Informática (INEI) divides the country into functional categories for censal purposes. Populated centres are defined as locations identified by name and intended to be permanently inhabited, usually by several families or, rarely, a single family or person. Housing in such locations may be grouped—forming city blocks (manzanas), streets and public squares—or not. The former may be seen in cities and towns, while the latter is typical of farms and other rural dwellings.

Populated centres are categorised by area:

- Urban Populated Centres (Centro poblado urbano) have at least 100 dwellings grouped contiguously; exceptionally, all district capitals are also classified as such, without exceptions.
- Rural Populated Centres (Centro poblado rural) neither have 100 contiguously grouped dwellings nor serve as a district capital, and where dwellings are generally dispersed.

Populated centres are also divided by size:

- Major Populated Centres (Centro poblado mayor) serve as the seat for government authorities (governor and lieutenant governors), local authorities (district and local mayors, municipal agent), or community leaders (president of the Peasant or Native Community). Its jurisdiction may encompass one or more minor population centres.
- Minor Populated Centres (Centro poblado menor) is located within the territorial scope of the jurisdiction of the authorities (lieutenant governors, minor mayors, municipal agents, and community presidents).

Urban nuclei are defined as one or more city blocks, which may be identified through a name and category. They include, among others:

- Asentamiento Humano (AA.HH.)
- Barrio
- Caserío
- Cercado
- Conjunto Habitacional (Conj. Hab.)
- Cooperativa (Coop.)
- Fundo (Fdo.)
- Grupo
- Pueblo Joven (P.J.)
- Residencial (Res.)
- Unidad Vecinal (U.V.)
- Urbanización (Urb.)
- Zona Industrial (Z.I.)

== List ==
Ubigeo	Departament	Number
01	Amazonas	67
02	Áncash	201
03	Apurímac	95
04	Arequipa	23
05	Ayacucho	141
06	Cajamarca	327
07	Callao (Note: Callao is a province that operates its own autonomous government despite not belonging to any region.)	1
08	Cuzco	127
09	Huancavelica	252
10	Huánuco	258
11	Ica	4
12	Junín	108
13	La Libertad	96
14	Lambayeque	36
15	Lima	56 (Note: Lima province has 1 minor populated centre, while the rest of the department has 55.)
16	Loreto	22
17	Madre de Dios	10
18	Moquegua	24
19	Pasco	71
20	Piura	67
21	Puno	308
22	San Martin	96
23	Tacna	24
24	Tumbes	7
25	Ucayali	16
	Total	2465

== See also ==
- Districts of Peru
- Provinces of Peru
- Regions of Peru
