= Herminio Blanco Mendoza =

Mexican economist

Mexico's Minister of Trade and Industry

Personal details
- Born: July 25, 1950 (age 76) Chihuahua
- Education: University of Chicago
- Occupation: Mexican economist

Herminio Alonso Blanco Mendoza (born July 25, 1950 in Chihuahua) is a Mexican economist.

Herminio Blanco has 27 years of experience in international trade. As Mexico's Minister of Trade and Industry, NAFTA Chief Negotiator and Vice Minister of International Negotiations, he played a role in the design and implementation of recent structural changes to Mexico's economy.

He directed the team that made Mexico the country with more free trade agreements in the world (34 countries at that time).

The current administration under Enrique Peña Nieto that brought the institutional revolutionary party (PRI) back to power in 2012 began active promotion of Blanco's candidacy to head the World Trade Organization during the Davos economic forum in 2013.

Many political analysts in Mexico believe that this promotion is a continuation or a proxy of former President Salinas de Gortari's failed candidacy to lead such organization, after significant controversy in connection with the end of President Salina's administration. Mr. Blanco is a close friend and collaborator of President Salinas.

The following are some of the main achievements of his 15 years of service in the Mexican Government (1985-2000):

1. As Chief Trade Negotiator, he led Mexico's participation in the Uruguay Round of multilateral trade negotiations and the establishment of the World Trade Organization (WTO).
2. He was the Head of the team that, at that time, made Mexico the country with the largest number of free trade agreements in the world (32 countries).
3. He was responsible for the Mexican government's lobbying efforts for the approval of NAFTA in the US Congress
4. Implemented many of the promotion efforts that contributed to the tripling of foreign direct investment in Mexico.
5. Designed and implemented a far-reaching reform program to eliminate red tape, enhance efficiency and increase transparency in Mexico's public sector.
6. Implemented a managerial re-engineering of the Ministry of Trade and Industry, which was recognized by the ISO9000 certification and the Government of Mexico Quality Award.
7. Designed and implemented numerous programs to improve the competitiveness of small and medium size enterprises (SME's), including the establishment of a consulting corporation with more than fifty offices in Mexico.

In his 12 years of experience in the private sector (2001-2012), Herminio Blanco has advised national and local governments, corporations and international organizations on trade policy and international economic strategic matters.

Herminio Blanco is founder and President of the Board of IQOM Inteligencia Comercial, the only international trade service in Mexico and Latin America that provides an online day-by-day analysis of governmental trade measures affecting corporations doing business in the region. IQOM has helped the Mexican government in the implementation of special software applications to promote the participation of small and medium enterprises in international trade. He is a member of several boards, including BLADEX, the Latin American Trade Bank whose mission is to finance international trade in Latin America.

Candidate to the post of World Trade Organization Director-General

At a meeting of the 157 member countries of the General Council of the World Trade Organization (WTO) and observer countries today, Herminio Blanco Mendoza presented his candidacy for the post of WTO Director-General.

Dr. Blanco explained his short-, medium- and long-term proposals, stressing that development would play a key role in each time period.

- Short-term horizon: The ninth Ministerial Conference to be held in December 2013 in Bali, Indonesia, must be a success, with concrete results on substantive issues.
- Medium-term horizon: The Members should address the outstanding issues of the Doha Round and make the various WTO bodies more efficient in meeting their objectives.
- Long-term horizon: The solutions offered by regional trade agreements to the new realities and measures affecting trade in goods and services must become part of the multilateral trading system.

Dr. Blanco said that the WTO has succeeded in promoting trade as a dynamic engine of economic growth and development in its member countries, and has helped alleviate protectionist pressures arising from the 2008 financial crisis. He also said that, although the Doha Round has not made progress, the WTO must be rescued from the risk of becoming irrelevant.

Professional Experience

1978-1980	Senior Advisor to the Finance Minister of Mexico.
1980-1985	Assistant Professor of Economics, Rice University. Houston, Texas.
1985-1988	Member of Council of Economic Advisors to the President of Mexico.
1988-1990	Vice-Minister for International Trade, Ministry of Trade and Industry.
1990-1993	Chief Negotiator of the North American Free Trade Agreement (NAFTA).
1993-1994	Vice-Minister for International Trade Negotiations, Ministry of Trade and Industry.
1994-2000	Ministerio de Comercio e Industria. Chairman of the National Council for Deregulation. Chairman of the Advisory Council for Trade Negotiations. Vice-Chairman of the Board of BANCOMEXT, the Mexican export promotion bank.
2001-	Member of the Board of the Foreign Trade Bank of Latin America, BLADEX. Member of the Board of CYDSA, a leading Mexican corporation chemical manufacturer, and of BANORTE, the leading Mexican bank. Member of the Board of the Cordell Hull Institute.
2002-	Founder and Chairman of the Board of Soluciones Estratégicas (Strategic Solutions), a company providing strategic advisory services on international trade and investment to governments and corporations.
2005-	Founder and Chairman of the Board of IQOM Inteligencia Comercial, the only international trade service in Mexico and Latin America that provides an online day-by-day analysis of governmental trade measures affecting corporations doing business in the region. IQOM is also very active in providing advice on international trade to corporations, national and local governments.

Academic Experience

Assistant Professor Rice University, Houston Texas (1980 - 1985)
Visiting Professor of Economics, Colegio de México and Instituto Autónomo de México (1987-1988)
Visiting Professor of Instituto Tecnológico y de Estudios Superiores de Monterrey (2011)

== Personal ==
Blanco earned a B.A. in Economics from Instituto Tecnológico y de Estudios Superiores de Monterrey in 1971 and Ph.D. in Economics from the University of Chicago in 1978. He is married and has two children. He is fluent in English and Spanish and has full understanding of French.
