= San Cristóbal Hill, Lima =

Hill in Lima, Peru

Cerro San Cristóbal
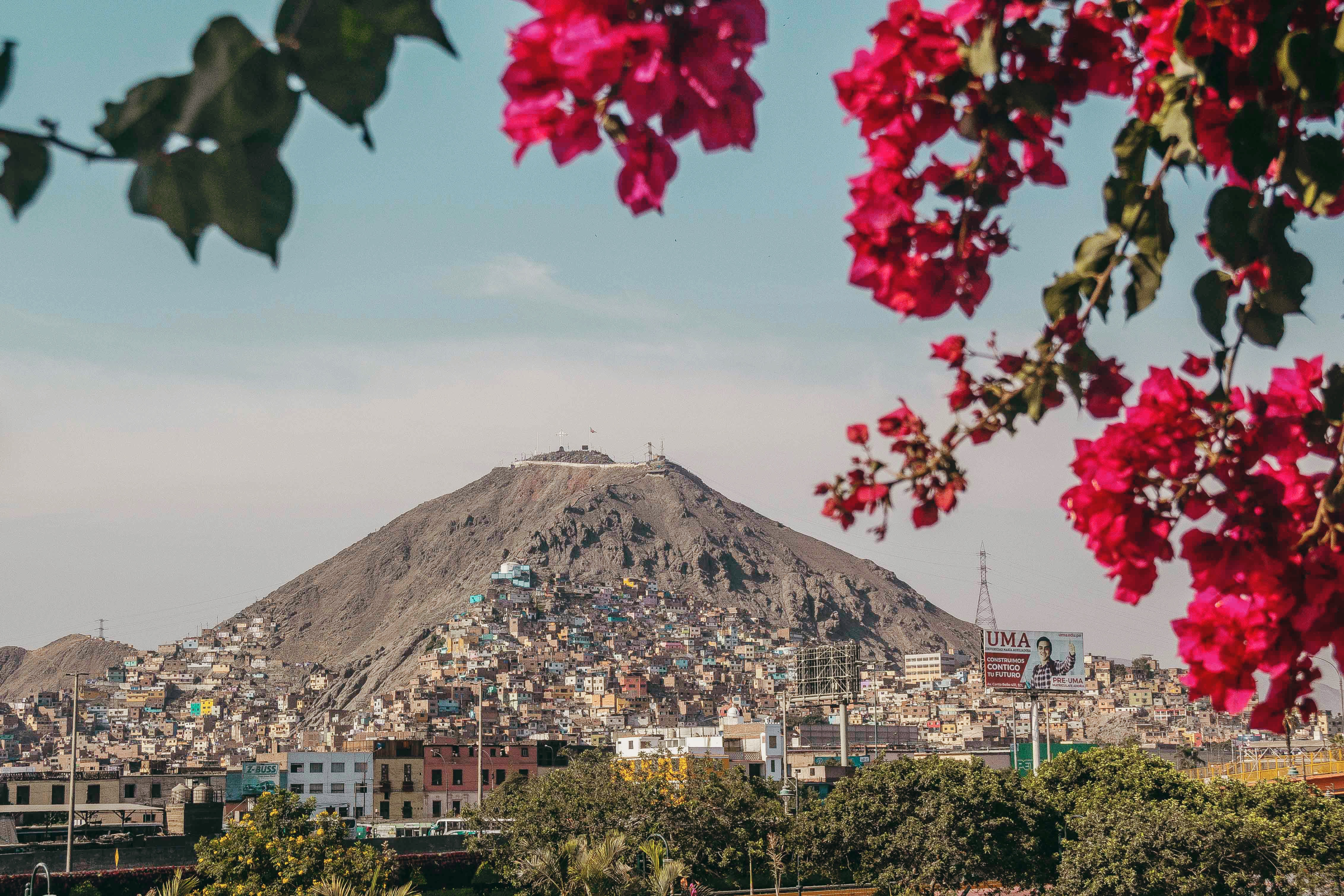
- View from Lima District

Highest point
- Elevation: 400 m (1,300 ft)
- Coordinates: 12°02′09″S 77°01′04″W

Geography
- Location within Peru
- Location: Lima, Peru
- Parent range: Andes

San Cristóbal Hill (Spanish: Cerro San Cristóbal) is a hill in Lima, Peru. It overlooks the city's districts of Rímac and San Juan de Lurigancho, and forms part of the Andean Mountain Range. Once considered an Apu by the pre-Columbian cultures that originally inhabited the area, it was given its current name by Francisco Pizarro in 1535. It currently functions as a scenic viewpoint of the city and its surroundings, and also operates a museum at its summit.

== History ==
The hill was considered an Apu by the pre-Columbian cultures that inhabited the area prior to the Spanish conquest of the Inca Empire.

The hill's cross was inaugurated on December 23, 1928, under the second presidency of Augusto B. Leguía.

In 2017, a tour bus crashed when it veered off the road during its return to the city, killing nine people on site, while 56 were hurt, of which one died en route to a hospital. The company operating the bus service, ATEM-CA S.A.C. (trading under the name Green Bus), had been granted a permit by the Metropolitan Municipality of Lima.

== Landmarks ==
The hill's summit hosts a 20-metre iron cross and a site museum.

== See also ==
- Morro Solar
- Rímac District
- Historic Centre of Lima
