= Carlo Ángeles =

Peruvian activist

Carlo Andre Angeles Manturano
- Born: 16 February 1993 (age 33); Lima, Peru
- Education: Universidad San Ignacio de Loyola Universidad San Martín de Porres Columbia University
- Title: Lima City councillor
- Term: 1 January 2019 - 31 December 2022
- Awards: Democracy Innovator of the 21st Century, Global Democracy Awards, National Award by the Parliament of Peru

Carlo André Ángeles Manturano (born 16 February 1993) is a Peruvian environmental and youth advocate and former executive director of Somos el Presente, a youth-led organization that empowers young people in Latin America to achieve United Nations Sustainable Development Goals by 2030. He advocated for a youth policy reform with political parties that participated in Peru´s 2016 general elections.

He has been invited as an expert in intergovernmental decision-making processes in 9 countries, including at the Annual Meeting of Governors of the World Bank / IMF, UN Habitat III, Civicus International Civil Society Week, World Health Organization Partners Forum, International Labor Organization Global Youth Employment Forum, among others. He has also served as member of United Nations Population Fund`s International Committee for International Conference on Population and Development 25, as member of the selection Committee for Civil Society Representative for United Nations Summit for the Adoption of the Post 2015 Development Agenda, Selection Committee for stakeholder speakers of UN President of General Assembly WSIS+10 consult, member of the Organizing Committee of the Youth Forum of the United Nations Intergovernmental Conference on the Global Compact for Migration and as judge for Organization of American States - TIC Americas and USAID Young Women Transform Prize.

On october 7 - 2017, he got elected as member of the Metropolitan City Council at the Government of Lima for the 2019-2022 term.

He has been recognized as a Democracy Innovator of the 21st century by the Athens Democracy Forum in association with the New York Times, has been awarded the Global Democracy Awards by the Washington Academy of Political Arts and Sciences, as a Leader for Development by the European Commission and was recognized by the National Parliament of Peru.

He has been the lead author of the Amazon Report of the Andean Parliament, a report that led to the declaration of international emergency of the Amazon Basin by the Andean Parliament and has raised the discussion on the critical state of the Amazon at international levels.

== Biography ==
Carlo Ángeles was born in Lima, Peru.

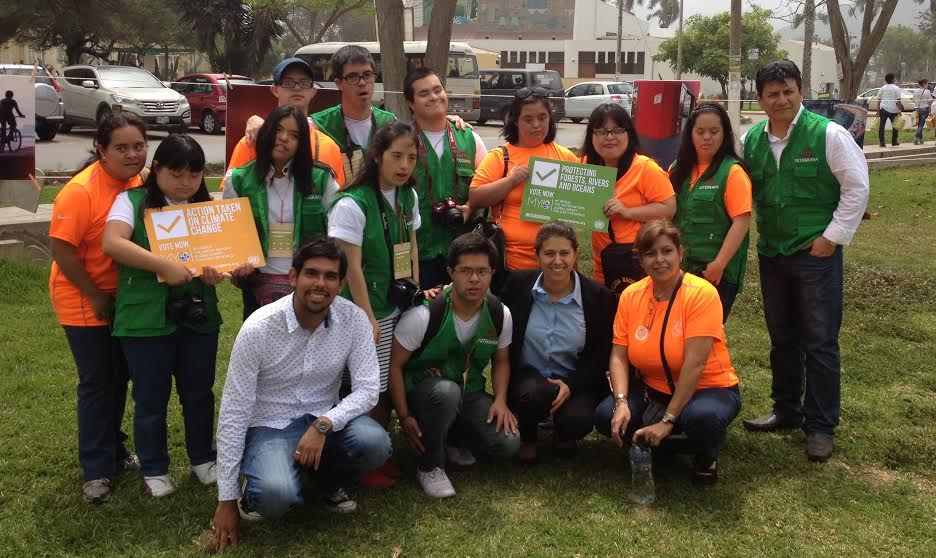
Advocating for disability at COY10

He was trained as a Psychologist at San Ignacio de Loyola University and holds a Master in Public Administration from Universidad San Martín de Porres and a Master in Public Administration in Global Leadership from Columbia University. While at University, he focused on researching the relation between welfare, turnover rate and productivity. He has participated in international conferences at Cologne University - World Business Dialogue and at Harvard University - The Harvard Project for Asian and International Relations.

He was named by El Comercio newspaper as an outstanding young psychologist.

== Professional career ==
At age 18, he founded a startup, TodosGanan.net which offered online marketing services. That same year, he founded the Association of University Students for Public Service which would eventually become Somos el Presente.

He has previously served as Chief for Lima and Callao of the National Youth Employment Program at the Ministry of Education and as National Director for Youth Organization, Promotion and Management at the Ministry of Education.

Under his tenure as Director for Youth Organization, Promotion and Management he developed the participation and accountability process for Youth to actively engage in the implementation of the Sustainaible Development Goals.

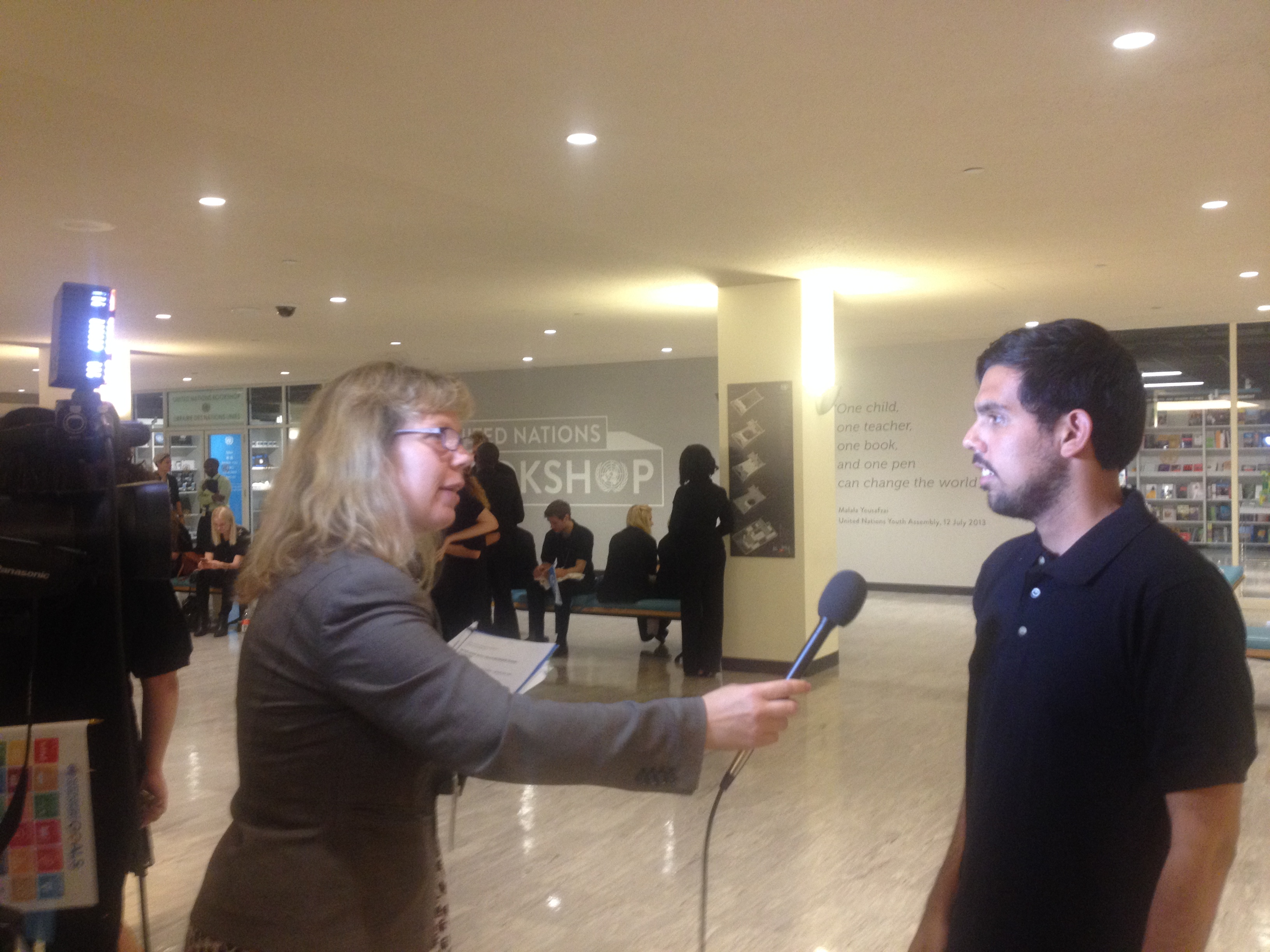
Carlo Angeles being interview during 70th United Nations General Assembly

Carlo Ángeles started a movement in 2013 to include young people in peacebuilding and train them to be future agents of dialogue and peace. He was invited by HOPE Foundation and Netherlands' Ministry of Foreign Affairs to join a working group of 70 young leaders at the International Court of Justice alongside mentors such as the 2013 Nobel Peace Prize and The Organisation for the Prohibition of Chemical Weapons, to draft a document that was presented in 2015 at United Nations as the global youth vision long term vision of the future.

== Work promoting United Nations Sustainable Development Goals ==
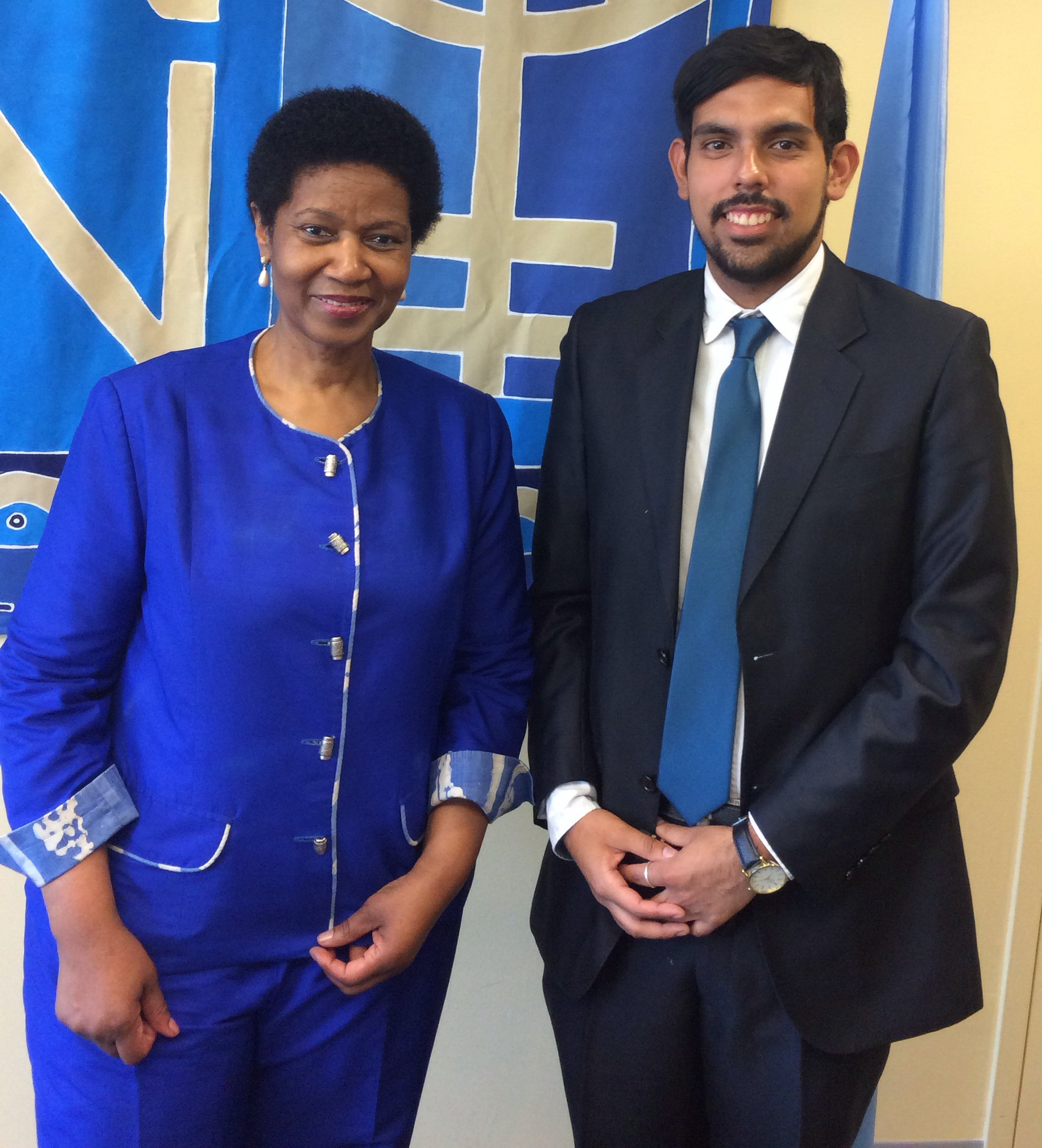
Carlo Angeles and UN Women Executive Director Phumzile Mlambo-Ngcuka

Angeles was appointed Global Youth Advocate for United Nations My World 2015 Campaign. In this role, he engaged youth in Peru, Colombia and Argentina with United Nations Post 2015 Agenda - Sustainable Development Goals and their governments.

He has engaged youth in Argentina by co–organizing an event on the Post 2015 Agenda at the National Parliament of the Republic of Argentina engaging youth and congressmen. In Colombia, he delivered My World 2015 report to the Presidential Youth Program, Colombia Joven. In Peru, he co-hosted a youth summit on the Post 2015 Agenda engaging 1000 youth delegates, Minister of State, José Gallardo Ku and other policy makers.

He also engaged youth globally through My World 2015 Campaign at international youth-led events such as COY10 in Peru, International Association of Political Science Students World Congress in London, among others.

His Organization was the only Peruvian organization to be granted special accreditation by United Nations to attend United Nations Summit for the Adoption of the Post - 2015 Development Agenda, one of the most important summits in United Nations history.

He has been invited as a speaker in several international events covering topics such as sustainable development, gender equality, youth, disability and participation mechanisms.

== International Working Groups ==
He was member of Selection Committee for Civil Society Speakers in UN Summit for the adoption of the Post-2015 Development Agenda, advocating for youth representation from the civil society representative elected. One of the first tasks assigned to the Selection Committee was the selection of the Civil Society Representative that addressed the UN General Assembly Plenary. Salil Shetty was elected to deliver a speech representing civil society worldwide after Pope Francis and Nobel Peace Prize, Malala. On September 25 Salil Shetty delivered a speech to heads of state at United Nations General Assembly where he addressed the role of young people in combating corruption, inequality, social injustice and climate change.

Carlo Angeles was member of several high-level international working groups in which he advocated for youth engagement as partners for sustainable development.

He was invited to join Second Meeting of the Inter-agency and Expert Group on Sustainable Development Goals in Bangkok, Thailand, which addressed the design process of the indicators that were used to track the success of United Nations Sustainable Development Goals by 2030.

He was member of Policy & Strategy Group of World We Want 2015, United Nations and civil society data curation and visualization platform for Post 2015 agenda.

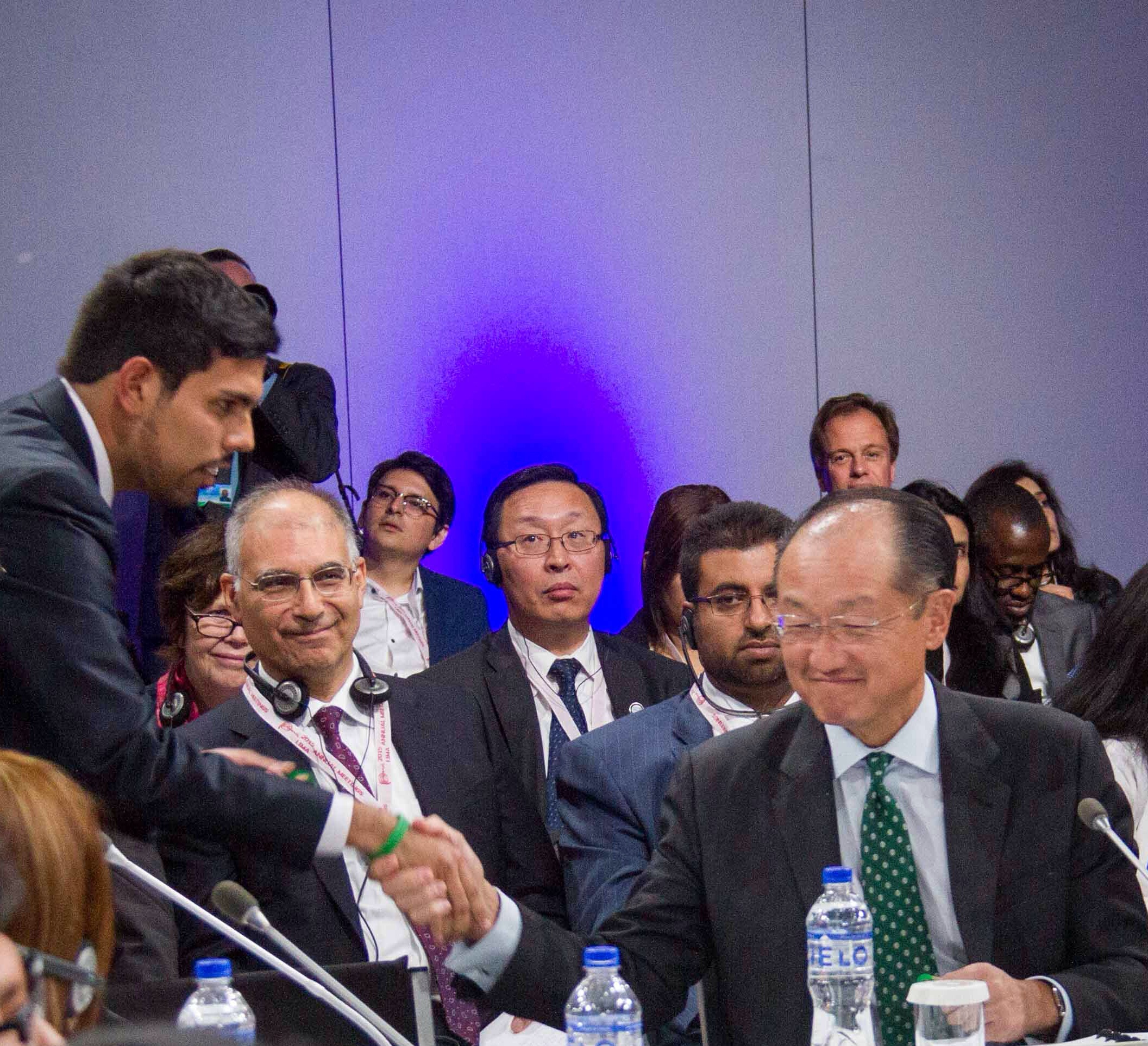
Carlo Angeles and World Bank President, Dr. Kim

He has been invited as a speaker and has advocated for youth engagement in sustainable development at several international high-level events like COY10, Annual Meetings of the International Monetary Fund and the World Bank Group, United Nations 70th General Assembly High-Level Panels, World Trade Organization Ministerial Conference, Concordia Summit, Open Government Partnership Global Summit.

During his master's studies at Columbia University, he focused his research on the Amazon, which led to the creation of the High-Level Working Group for the Amazon at the Andean Parliament. Alongside the Science Panel for the Amazon, he was the main author of the Amazon Report of the Andean Parliament, a document that has led to the declaration of the international state of emergency off the Amazon Basin by the Andean Parliament and led to raising this debate to the United Nations and the Organization of American States.

== Youth Policy Reform ==
Carlo Ángeles successfully advocated for a youth policy reform with political parties that participated in 2016 general elections. He presented several youth participation mechanisms policies that were later on implemented.
