= Census in Peru =

Census

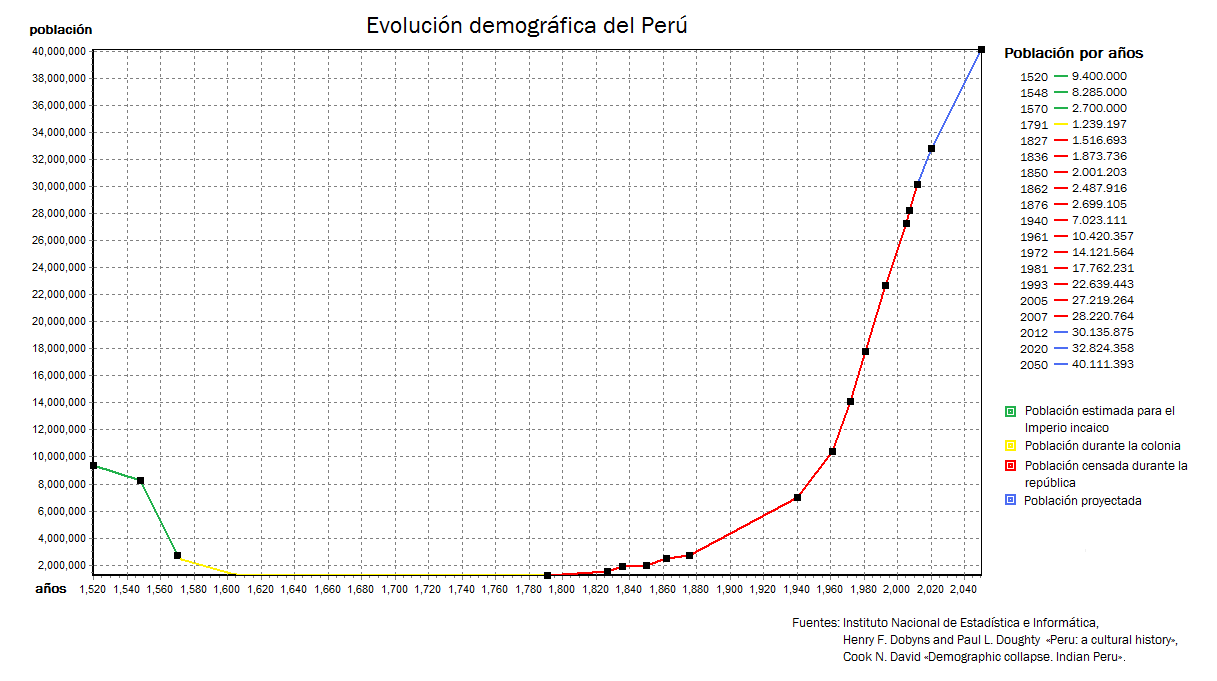
Demographic evolution of Peru

A census in Peru is the enumeration of the Peruvian population made by the Peruvian government. By law (Law Nº 13248) a population and household census has to be executed every ten years. The latest census was held in 2025.

The first five times the census was held, only population data was included. From the sixth census onwards, household data has also been included.

== Chronology ==

The following table shows the year each census was held, as well as the total population number at the time.

No.	Date	Population	Change since previous census
1	1836	1,873,736	N/A
2	1850	2,001,203	127,467
3	1862	2,487,916	486,713
4	1876	2,699,105	211,189
5	1940	7,023,111	4,324,006
6	1961	10,420,357	3,397,246
7	1973	14,121,564	3,701,207
8	1981	17,762,231	3,640,667
9	1993	22,639,443	4,877,212
10	2005	26,152,265	3,512,822
11	2007	28,220,764	2,068,499
12	2017	31,237,385	3,016,621

== See also ==
- Instituto Nacional de Estadística e Informática
