= Chemical Society of Peru =

Peruvian research institute

Chemical Society of Peru Official Logo

Chemical Society of Peru is a non-profit scientific institution devoted to chemistry. It was founded in 1933 and groups to all the professionals related to natural sciences in which chemistry plays an important role, such as chemists, chemical engineers, chemical pharmacists, biologists, biochemists and physicians.

== Contributions to scientific research in Peru ==
In the last sixty years the institution has diversified in many areas of research including Bromatology, Nutrition, Biochemistry, Phytochemistry and Physical chemistry. It also has developed several new programs to improve chemistry learning in public schools and universities; it has organized events to promote investigation and development of chemistry; such as the "5th South American Congress of Chemistry" and served as host of "13th Latin American Congress of Chemistry".

Peruvian Board of Chemists seal.

== Organization ==
The Chemical society is directed by a board of trustees (chosen biennially) and whose members, are encouraged to spread and significantly develop scientific research, the majority has PhD or doctorate degree and many of its members have lectured in the prestigious chemistry department at National University of San Marcos.

This institution is supervised by the "Peruvian council of chemistry" (also known as "Peruvian Board of Chemists") and it has the approval of IUPAC and its affiliates.
