= Alberto Thieroldt =

Alberto Thieroldt (born 4 January 1966 in Lima), is a sociologist and children's literature writer. He has a Bachelor's degree in Sociology, Bachelor's degree in Education and a Master's degree in Children's and Youth Literature. He is a university educator. He has been a judge in many literature contests and teaches in writing workshops.

== Books ==
- Juicio en el zoológico. Bogotá: Norma, 2004.
- Los caras pintadas. Bogotá: Norma, 2007.
- Valentino y la mentira de Duque. Lima: Norma, 2008.
- La farsa. Lima: Norma, 2007.
- La oleada. Lima: Norma, 2010.
- ¿Quién es el más importante?. Lima: Norma, 2011.
- Mundo cereza. Lima: Ed. Planeta, 2014.
- Mi papá se ha perdido. Lima: SM, 2018.
- A paso de Limeña. Lima: Ed. Panamericana, 2018.
- Corazón de madera. Lima: Norma, 2019.
