= Banco Latinoamericano de Comercio Exterior =

- Formerly: Banco Latinoamericano de Exportaciones, S.A.
- Traded as: NYSE: BLX; Russell 2000 Component
- Headquarters: Panama City, Panama
- Services: Multinational banking
- Website: bladex.com/en

Banco Latinoamericano de Comercio Exterior, S.A. (English: Foreign Trade Bank of Latin America, known as Bladex, its commercial trademark) is a multinational bank. Founded in 1977 as Banco Latinoamericano de Exportaciones, S.A. and renamed in June 2009, the company is headquartered in Panama City and finances Latin America and the Caribbean foreign trade.

== History ==
In May 1975, the Republic of Panama proposed to the Central Bank Governors of Latin America for export finance, it was approved in 1976, organized in 1977, incoporporated in 1978, and opened for business on January 2, 1979. It was the first Latin American bank to be listed on the NYSE in 1992. It was one of the tenants in One World Trade Center. It is one of the Companies listed on the New York Stock Exchange (B).

== Business ==
The company finances Latin America and the Caribbean foreign trade through commercial (short and medium-term bilateral, structured and syndicated credits, and loan commitments) and treasury segments.

== Current and former board members ==
- Manuel Sánchez (economist)
- Herminio Blanco Mendoza
- Guillermo Wiese de Osma
