= Colegio Max Uhle =

Colegio Peruano Alemán Max Uhle
- Arequipa; Peru

Information
- Type: German international school
- Motto: In Bewegung
- Established: 1956
- Principal: Jürgen Mattman
- Grades: 1-12
- Enrollment: 1,100

Colegio Max Uhle (German: Deutsche Schule Max Uhle Arequipa) is a German international school in Arequipa, Peru. It serves years 1–12.

The school's activities began in 1956.

== History ==
In 1961, the school had 269 students, with 70 in kindergarten, 41 in transition, 138 in primary, and 20 in secondary. In 1967, it moved to its current site, a 15,000-square-metre (160,000 sq ft) campus built for 1,360,000 German marks, funded by the West German government. In 2002, the school began allowing preschool students after a 2001 installation of nine classrooms, funded by US$530,000 on a 7,500-square-metre (81,000 sq ft) plot of land. As of 2016, the school has over 1,100 students.

== See also ==
- German Peruvian
