= Guillermo Wiese de Osma =

Peruvian businessman and lawyer

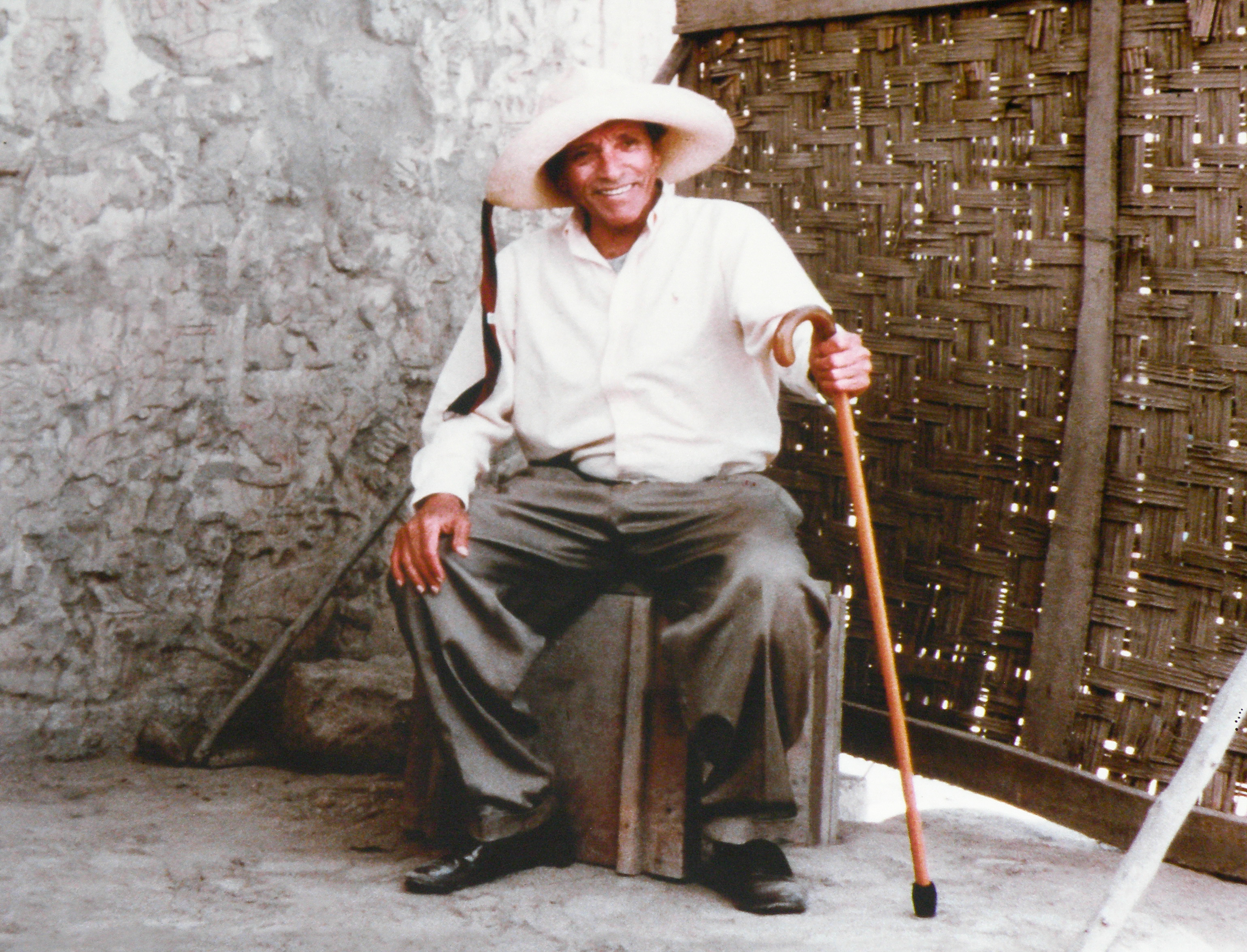
Guillermo Wiese de Osma

Guillermo Wiese de Osma (1927 in Paris – April 27, 1999 in Lima, Peru) was a Peruvian businessman and lawyer. He was the son of Augusto N. Wiese Eslava and Virginia de Osma Porras, who had another 4 children (Clotilde, Silvia, Mary Virginia and Philip Augustus). He was married to Delfina Miró Quesada Cornejo and was the father of 5 daughters (Marina, Virginia, Delphine, Diana and Veronica Wiese Miró Quesada).

== Education and career ==
Guillermo Wiese de Osma studied law at the Pontifical Catholic University of Peru. With longstanding ties to banking, in 1952 he took on a job in the prominent Wiese Bank, founded by his father in 1943. He became director the following year, Vice Chairman in 1957 and Chairman in 1971.

Because of his experience, Wiese was appointed Director of the Central Reserve Bank of Peru between August 1962 and December 1966 and also the Bladex. He was also the alternate governor of Felaban and representative of the Association of Banks in the Confiep.

When the private bank began experiencing difficult times he managed to keep it afloat under private property. He was then named Honorary President of the Board of Wiese Bank, President of Business and Real Estate of Wiese Financial Investments, and Vice president of A & F Wiese and Wiese Representations. He is remembered for his firmness within the Wiese bank for not being driven out by the police who were carrying out Alan Garcia's mandate for the nationalization of banks.

== Death and legacy ==
Wiese died of a painful illness on Tuesday, April 27, 1999 in Lima, where his remains laid in wait at the Church of the Virgen del Pilar, San Isidro and was buried in the Park Cemetery Campo Fe, Huachipa, built on what was the Wiese de Osma and Checa Solari Ranch. Victor Miró Quesada, General Manager of Wiese Bank, said goodbye on behalf of the Bank and Felipe Thorndike, on behalf of friends.

== Awards and recognition ==
- Peruvian Order of the Cross - Naval Merit - High Official Grade.
- IPAE Award 1979
