= Colegio Peruano-Alemán Beata Imelda =

Colegio Alemán Beata Imelda
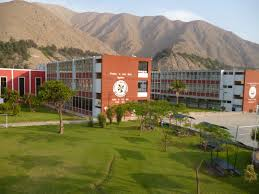
- Lurigancho-Chosica, Lima, Lima; Peru

Information
- Type: German international school
- Grades: Kindergarten, primary, secondary, and International Baccalaureate

Colegio alemán Beata Imelda (German: Deutsche Schule Beata Imelda) is a German international school located in Chosica, Lima Province, Peru.
