= Santa María de Huachipa =

Town in Lima, Peru

- Populated centre
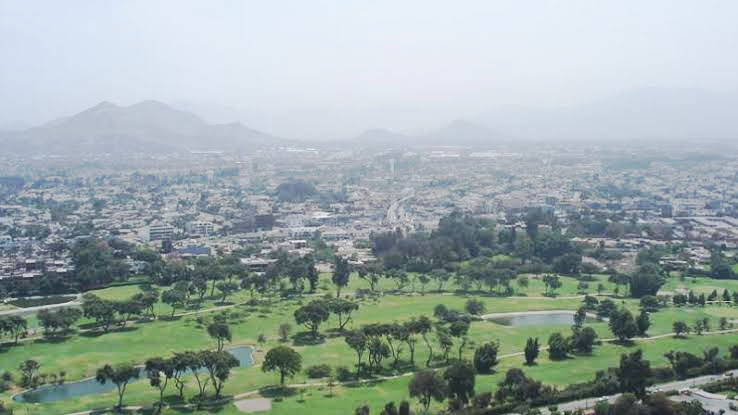

- Location within Peru
- Country: Peru
- Department: Lima
- Province: Lima
- District: Lurigancho-Chosica
- Founded: 23 January 1992
- Subdivisions: 5 Zones: Huertos de Huachipa; Santa Rosa; La Capitana; Santa María; Huachipa Norte

Government
  - Mayor: Jacqueline Cartolin

Population (2017)
  - Total: 31,890
- Time zone: UTC-5 (PET)

Santa María de Huachipa is a town in Lurigancho-Chosica, a district of Lima Province, Peru.

== History ==
The minor populated centre was created on January 23, 1992, at the request of the association of landowners of semi-rustic lot "El Club" and the Huachipa Norte neighbourhood, in Lurigancho-Chosica. It is located in the district's southwest corner, and limited to the south by the Rímac River.

Since 1999, the name of the town is associated with the zoo on the other side on the river. However, this zoo is not located in Huachipa, but in Ate District, on the other side of the river.

== See also ==
- Lurigancho-Chosica
- Huachipa Zoo
