= 2007 Peruvian census =

Eleventh Census of Peru
← 2005	October 21, 2007	2017 →
- Census Logo

General information
- Country: Peru

Results
- Total population: 28,220,764 (▲ ??%)
- Most populous region: Lima; 8,564,867
- Least populous region: Madre de Dios; 112,814

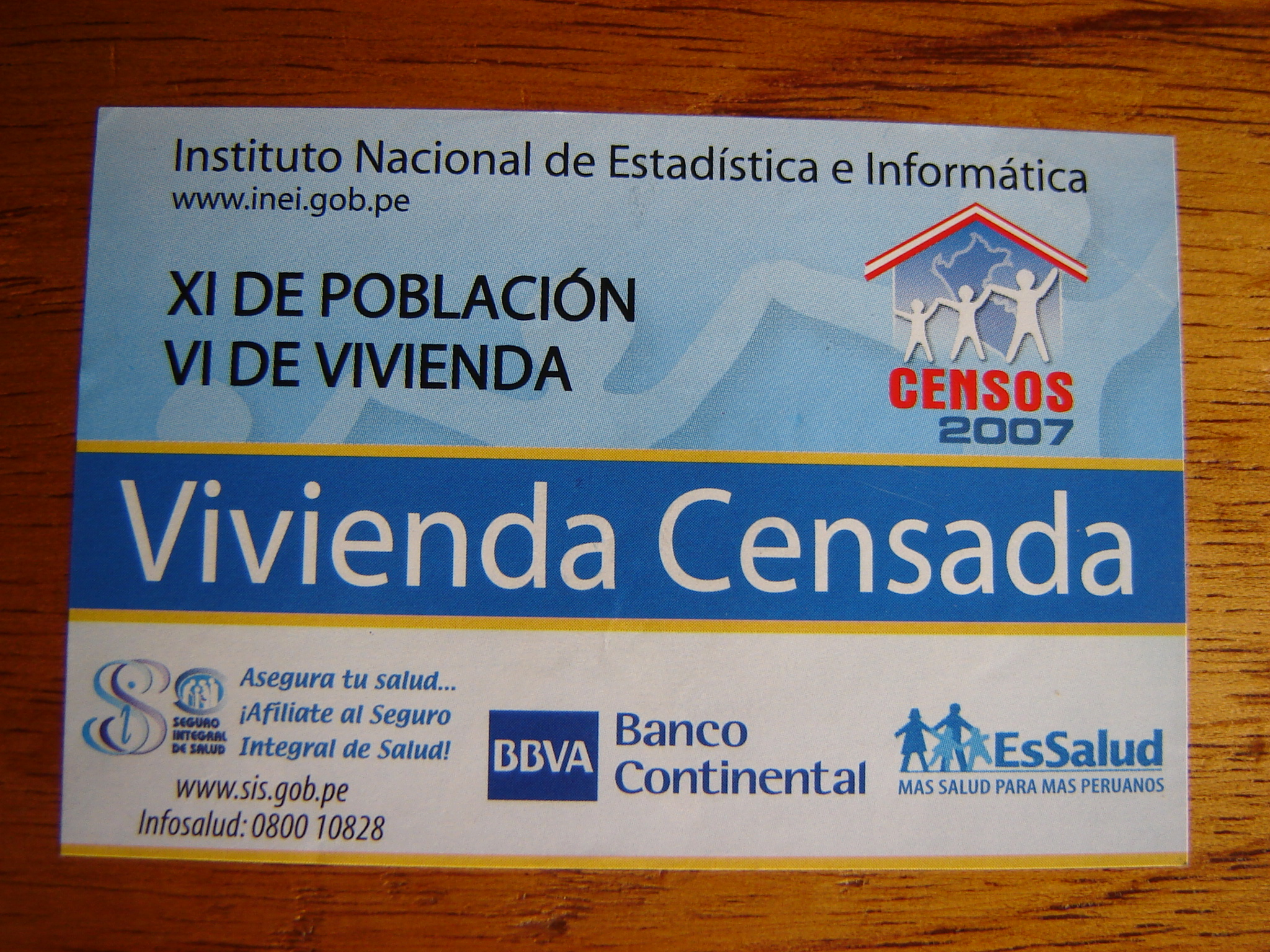
Label that identifies enumerated houses.

The 2007 Peru Census was a detailed enumeration of the Peruvian population. It was conducted by the Instituto Nacional de Estadística e Informática on Sunday, October 21, 2007. Its full name in Spanish is XI Censo de Población y VI de Vivienda (Eleventh Population and Sixth Household Census). The previous census performed in Peru was the 2005 Census, the following census was the 2017 Peru Census.

== Population by region ==
Region	Population
Peru	28,220,764
Amazonas	411,011
Ancash	1,099,573
Apurímac	438,782
Arequipa	1,177,330
Ayacucho	653,755
Cajamarca	1,455,201
Callao	890,887
Cusco	1,216,168
Huancavelica	477,102
Huánuco	795,780
Ica	727,824
Junín	1,272,890
La Libertad	1,663,602
Lambayeque	1,142,757
Lima	8,564,867
Loreto	921,518
Madre de Dios	112,814
Moquegua	165,492
Pasco	290,275
Piura	1,725,488
Puno	1,320,075
San Martín	753,339
Tacna region	294,965
Tumbes	204,650
Ucayali	444,619

== See also ==
- Instituto Nacional de Estadística e Informática (INEI)
