= Instituto Nacional de Estadística e Informática =

Peru's government institution in charge of statistics and census data

National Institute of Statistics and Information

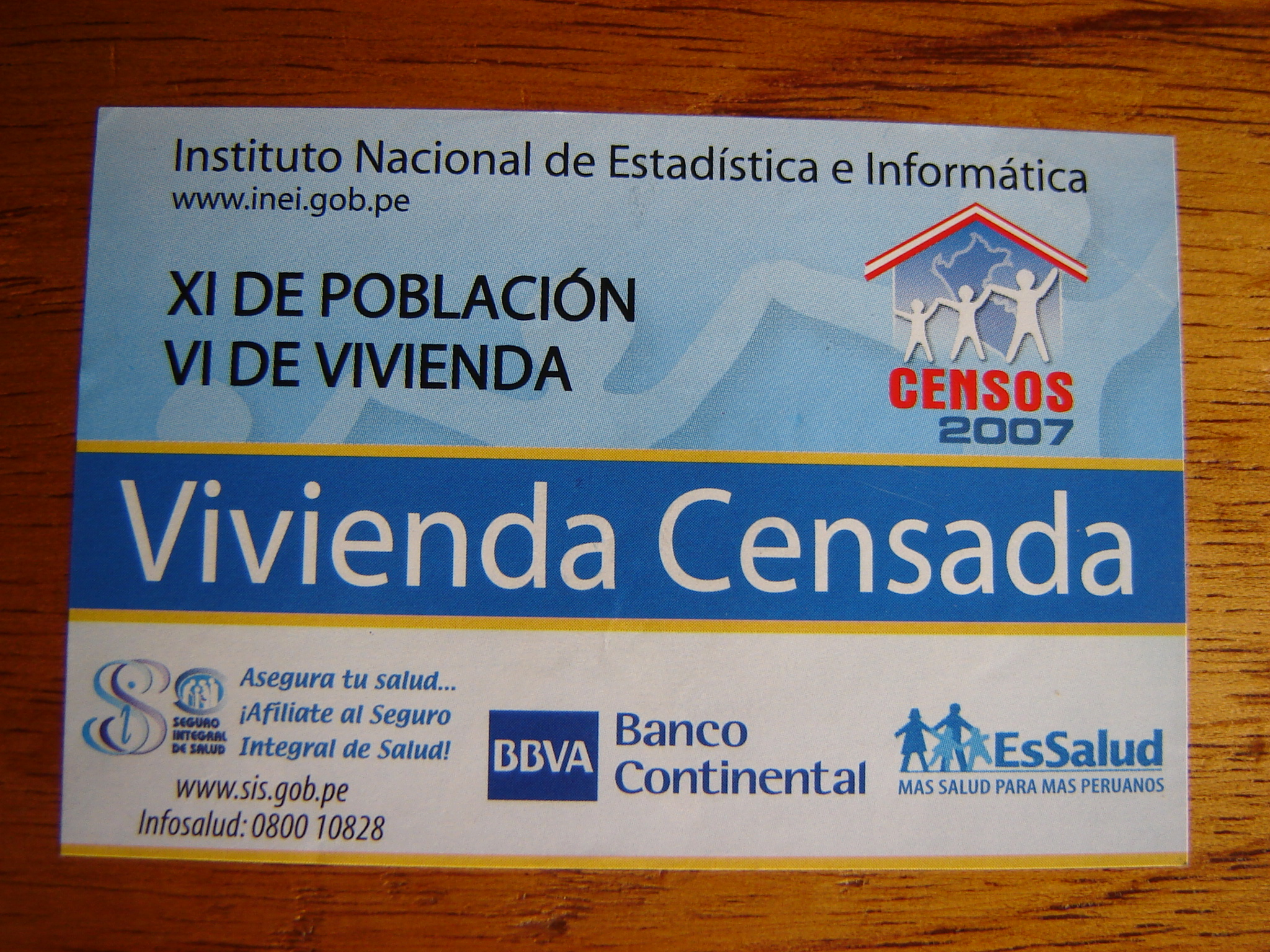
- The 2007 Census

Agency overview
- Formed: April 30, 1990; 36 years ago
- Headquarters: Av. General Garzón 658
- Director responsible: Dante Rafael Carhuavilca Bonett
- Website: www.gob.pe/inei/

The National Institute of Statistics and Information (Spanish: Instituto Nacional de Estadística e Informática; INEI) is a semi-autonomous Peruvian government agency which coordinates, compiles, and evaluates statistical information for the country. It eases decision-making with the help of quality statistical information and the use of information technology and thus helps develop the country's society.

Its current director is Dante Rafael Carhuavilca Bonett.

== Censuses ==
The latest census performed by the INEI is the 2017 Census, which was conducted from August 22 through November 5 of that year. Its preliminary results will be released to the public in 3 months, and final results in January 2018. An earlier census is the 2007 Census.

== Coding systems ==
In its reports INEI uses standard coding systems for geographical location (Ubicación Geográfica; UBIGEO) and classification of economical activities (Clasificación Nacional de Actividades Económicas del Perú; ClaNAE).

== See also ==
- Census in Peru
