= Demographics of Peru =

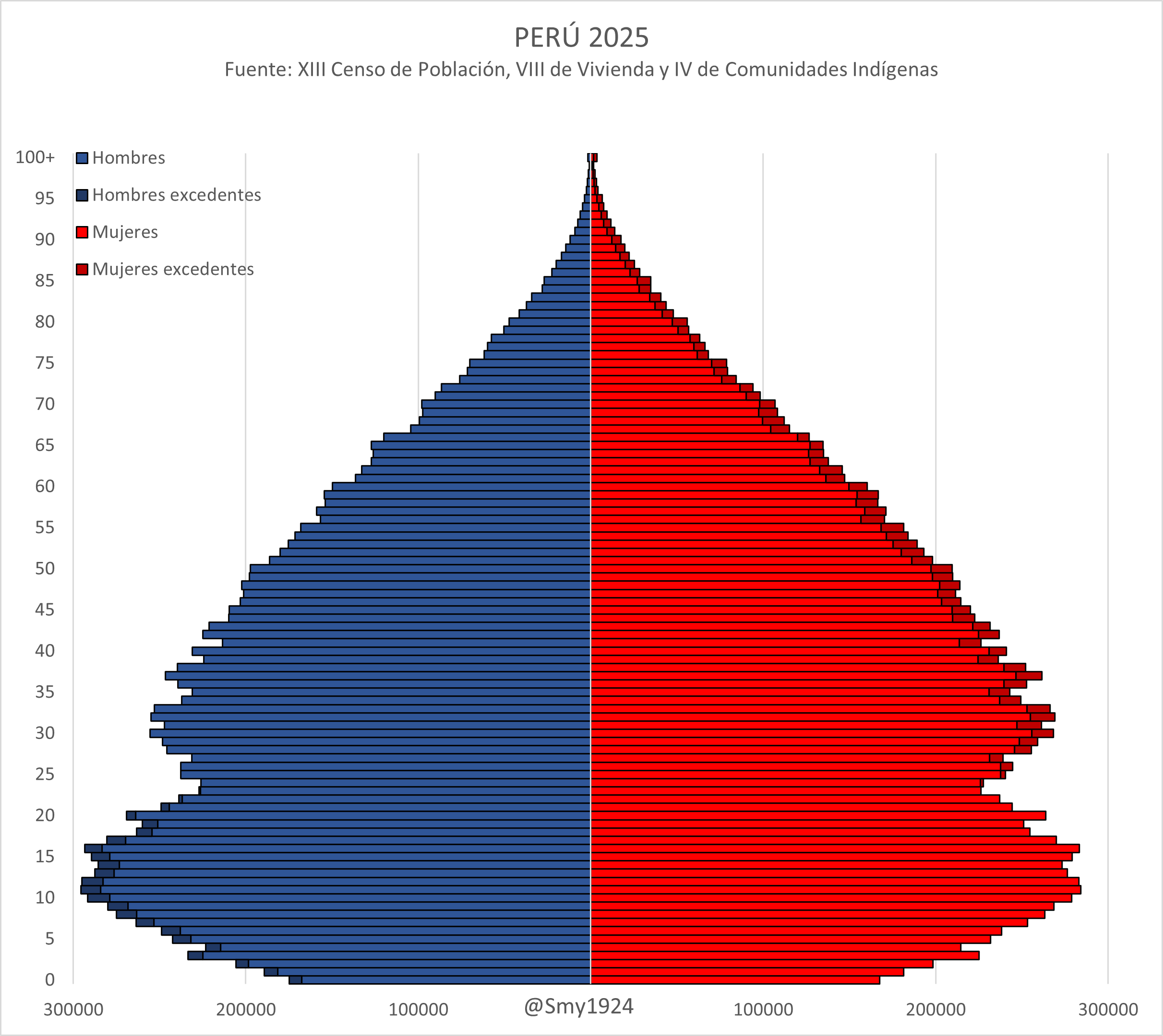
- Population pyramid of Peru in 2025
- Population: 33,726,000 (2023 est.)
- Growth rate: 0.35% (2025 est.)
- Birth rate: 10.9 births/1,000 population (2025 est.)
- Death rate: 4.8 deaths/1,000 population (2024 est.)
- Life expectancy: 68.94 years
  - male: 65.38 years
  - female: 72.67 years
- Fertility rate: 1.59 children born/woman (2025 est.)
- Infant mortality: 10.8 deaths/1,000 live births
- Net migration rate: −0.75 migrant(s)/1,000 population

Age structure
- 0–14 years: 24.54%
- 15–64 years: 66.25%
- 65 and over: 9.21%

Nationality
- Nationality: Peruvian
- Major ethnic: Mixed (60.20%)
- Minor ethnic: Native (25.75%); Quechua (22.32%); Aymara (2.36%); Asháninka (0.24%); Aguaruna (0.16%); Shipibo-Conibo (0.11%); Others (0.56%); White (5.89%); Spanish (N/D); Italian (N/D); German (N/D); Others (N/D); Black (3.57%); East Asian (0.16%); Japanese (0.10%); Chinese (0.06%); Others (4.42%)

Language
- Official: Spanish (82.6%); Quechua (13.9%); Aymara (1.7%); Other native languages (0.8%)
- Spoken: Languages of Peru

Historical population of Peru

This is a demography of the population of Peru including population density, ethnicity, religious affiliations and other aspects of the population.

Peru is a multiethnic country, which means that it is home to people of many different historical backgrounds. Therefore, it is a multicultural country as well. Since it is a multiethnic society, Peruvian people usually treat their nationality as a citizenship instead of an ethnicity.

== Population size and structure ==
According to the 2022 revision of the World Population Prospects the total population was 33,715,471 in 2021, compared to only 7,728,000 in 1950. The proportion of children below the age of 15 in 2010 was 27.9%, 65.3% were between 15 and 65 years of age, while 6.8% were 65 years or older.

	Total population ( × 1000)	Population percentage		
	Total population ( × 1000)	aged 0–14	aged 15–64	aged 65+
1950	7728	41.6%	55.0%	3.5%
1955	8787	42.1%	54.5%	3.4%
1960	10062	43.0%	53.6%	3.5%
1965	11608	43.9%	52.5%	3.5%
1970	13341	43.8%	52.6%	3.5%
1975	15230	43.1%	53.3%	3.6%
1980	17359	41.8%	54.5%	3.7%
1985	19545	40.3%	55.9%	3.8%
1990	21827	38.5%	57.5%	4.0%
1995	24039	36.3%	59.3%	4.4%
2000	25915	34.3%	60.8%	4.9%
2005	27610	31.6%	62.8%	5.6%
2010	29374	29.3%	64.5%	6.2%
2015	31115	27.9%	65.3%	6.8%
2020	32950	25.7%	65.4%	6.7%

Historical population

Year	Pop.	±%
5000 BC	603,000	—
2000 BC	1,040,000	+72.5%
1000 BC	1,250,000	+20.2%
0	1,590,000	+27.2%
1000	3,000,000	+88.7%
1500	10,000,000	+233.3%
1570	2,500,000	−75.0%

Year	Pop.	±%
1600	1,300,000	−48.0%
1700	1,500,000	+15.4%
1800	1,270,000	−15.3%
1900	3,690,000	+190.6%
1940	7,023,111	+90.3%
1961	10,420,357	+48.4%
1972	14,121,564	+35.5%

Year	Pop.	±%
1981	17,762,231	+25.8%
1993	22,639,443	+27.5%
2007	28,220,764	+24.7%
2017	31,237,385	+10.7%
2025	34,157,732	+9.3%

View source data.
View source data.
View source data.
View source data.

Population map of Peru in 2007 (regional)

=== Structure of the population ===
Population Estimates by Sex and Age Group (01.VII.2013) (Estimates based on the 2007 Population Census.):

Age group	Male	Female	Total	%
Total	15 271 062	15 204 082	30 475 144	100
0–4	1 480 990	1 421 071	2 902 061	9.52
5–9	1 494 879	1 439 049	2 933 928	9.63
10–14	1 484 138	1 434 336	2 918 474	9.58
15–19	1 468 223	1 425 272	2 893 495	9.49
20–24	1 416 897	1 382 963	2 799 860	9.19
25–29	1 306 593	1 283 240	2 589 833	8.50
30–34	1 195 857	1 179 479	2 375 336	7.79
35–39	1 093 901	1 083 633	2 177 534	7.15
40–44	949 209	947 326	1 896 535	6.22
45–49	823 574	829 474	1 653 048	5.42
50–54	691 250	705 667	1 396 917	4.58
55–59	554 524	576 245	1 130 769	3.71
60–64	436 614	462 886	899 500	2.95
65–69	327 821	357 853	685 674	2.25
70–74	240 978	275 844	516 822	1.70
75–79	166 611	204 668	371 279	1.22
80+	139 003	195 076	334 079	1.10
Age group	Male	Female	Total	Percent
0–14	4 460 007	4 294 456	8 754 463	28.73
15–64	9 936 642	9 876 185	19 812 827	65.01
65+	874 413	1 033 441	1 907 854	6.26

Population Estimates by Sex and Age Group (30.VI.2021) (Source: INEI – National population estimates and projections.):

Age group	Male	Female	Total	%
Total	16 394 177	16 641 127	33 035 304	100
0–4	1 429 061	1 363 558	2 792 619	8.45
5–9	1 313 359	1 288 499	2 601 858	7.88
10–14	1 362 451	1 350 040	2 712 491	8.21
15–19	1 228 918	1 265 724	2 494 642	7.55
20–24	1 249 221	1 402 839	2 652 060	8.03
25–29	1 330 977	1 398 567	2 729 544	8.26
30–34	1 328 246	1 292 197	2 620 443	7.93
35–39	1 262 203	1 226 189	2 488 392	7.53
40–44	1 170 794	1 121 022	2 291 816	6.94
45–49	992 814	999 696	1 992 510	6.03
50–54	893 909	901 725	1 795 634	5.44
55–59	783 444	780 334	1 563 778	4.73
60–64	610 966	645 359	1 256 325	3.80
65-69	503 321	540 532	1 043 853	3.16
70–74	382 384	395 713	778 097	2.36
75–79	258 224	288 165	546 389	1.65
80+	293 885	380 968	674 853	2.04
Age group	Male	Female	Total	Percent
0–14	4 104 871	4 002 097	8 106 968	24.54
15–64	10 851 492	11 033 652	21 885 144	66.25
65+	1 437 814	1 605 378	3 043 192	9.21

=== Metropolitan areas ===
The metropolitan areas of Peru have been formed from the urban growth of Peruvian cities more populated and they are formed by the integration of two or more municipalities. The most populated Peruvian metropolises by districts are: Lima, Trujillo, Chiclayo and Arequipa.

== Vital statistics ==
=== Registered births and deaths ===
Year	Population	Live births	Deaths	Natural increase	Crude birth rate	Crude death rate	Rate of natural increase	Crude migration rate	TFR
1970	13,453,692	559,595	185,338	374,275	41.6	13.8	27.8		
1971	13,829,543		183,052			13.2			
1972	14,214,908	574,458	180,767	393,691	40.4	12.7	27.7	0.2	
1973	14,608,406	582,922	182,608	400,314	39.9	12.5	27.4	0.3	
1974	15,008,648	591,386	184,449	406,397	39.4	12.3	27.1	0.3	
1975	15,414,250	599,850	186,291	413,559	38.9	12.1	26.8	0.2	
1976	15,826,152	608,314	188,132	420,182	38.4	11.9	26.5	0.2	
1977	16,245,280	616,778	189,973	426,805	38	11.7	26.3	0.2	
1978	16,670,224	618,799	190,450	428,349	37.1	11.4	25.7	0.5	
1979	17,099,568	620,820	190,727	430,093	36.3	11.2	25.2	0.6	
1980	17,531,898	622,842	191,403	431,439	35.5	10.9	24.6	0.7	
1981	17,967,707	624,863	191,880	432,983	34.8	10.7	24.1	0.8	
1982	18,407,934	626,884	192,357	434,527	34.1	10.4	23.6	0.9	
1983	18,851,845	628,636	190,628	438,008	33.3	10.1	23.2	0.9	
1984	19,298,720	639,338	188,899	450,439	33.1	9.8	23.3	0.4	
1985	19,747,819	632,139	187,169	444,970	32	9.5	22.5	0.7	
1986	20,201,403	633,891	185,440	448,451	31.4	9.2	22.2	0.8	
1987	20,659,953	523,492	183,711	339,781	25.3	8.9	16.4	6.3	
1988	21,120,089	555,003	181,549	373,454	26.3	8.6	17.7	4.6	
1989	21,578,440	644,939	179,386	465,553	29.9	8.3	21.6	0.1	
1990	22,031,627	649,588	177,224	472,364	29.5	8	21.4	−0.4	
1991	22,479,500	665,734	175,061	490,673	29.6	7.8	21.8	−1.5	
1992	22,924,304	667,743	172,889	494,854	29.1	7.5	21.6	−1.8	
1993	23,366,275	667,435	171,188	496,247	28.6	7.3	21.2	−2	
1994	23,805,630	665,342	171,476	493,866	27.9	7.2	20.7	−1.9	
1995	24,242,600	660,354	156,000	504,354	27.2	6.4	20.8	−2.4	
1996	24,689,213	656,435	156,800	499,635	26.6	6.4	20.2	−1.8	
1997	25,145,317	652,467	160,830	491,637	25.9	6.4	19.6	−1.1	
1998	25,592,876	648,075	161,615	486,460	25.3	6.3	19	−1.2	
1999	26,013,829	642,874	162,457	480,417	24.7	6.2	18.5	−2	
2000	26,390,142	636,064			24.1				2.90
2001	26,714,547	630,947			23.6				
2002	26,999,085	626,714			23.2				
2003	27,254,632	623,521			22.9				
2004	27,492,091	620,991			22.6				2.56
2005	27,722,342	611,459	103,207	508,252	22.1	3.7	18.3	−10	2.56
2006	27,934,784	637,974	105,074	532,900	22.8	3.8	19.1	−11.4	2.56
2007	28,122,158	663,056	107,249	555,807	23.6	3.8	20.2	−13.8	2.56
2008	28,300,372	679,122	108,100	571,022	24	3.8	20.2	−13.8	
2009	28,485,319	660,716	110,811	549,905	23.2	3.9	19.3	−12.8	2.60
2010	28,692,915	637,902	108,178	529,724	22.2	3.8	18.5	−11.2	2.50
2011	28,905,725	794,040	118,456	675,584	27.5	4.1	23.4	−16	2.60
2012	29,113,162	698,954	119,652	579,302	24	4.1	19.9	−12.7	2.60
2013	29,341,346	666,999	125,581	541,418	22.7	4.3	18.5	−10.6	2.40
2014	29,616,414	668,220	132,830	535,390	22.6	4.5	18.1	−8.7	2.50
2015	29,964,499	652,075	134,858	517,217	21.8	4.5	17.3	−5.5	2.50
2016	30,422,831	626,259	145,521	480,738	20.6	4.8	15.8	−0.5	2.50
2017	30,973,992	610,316	150,032	460,284	19.7	4.8	14.9	3.3	2.40
2018	31,562,130	601,781	151,690	450,091	19.1	4.8	14.3	4.7	2.20
2019	32,131,400	581,022	157,680	423,342	18.1	4.9	13.2	4.9	2.00
2020	32,625,948	421,096	240,915	180,181	12.9	7.4	5.5	9.9	1.90
2021	33,035,304	535,433	273,349	262,084	16.2	8.3	7.9	4.6	2.32(e)
2022	33,396,698	516,295	175,014	341,281	15.5	5.2	10.2	0.7	2.1(e)
2023	33,845,617	462,755	168,081	294,674	13.7	5.0	8.7	1.1	1.8
2024	34,217,848	417,180	162,907	254,273	12.3	4.8	7.5	1.8	1.67(e)
2025	34,576,665	376,815			10.9				1.57(e)
2026									

=== Current vital statistics ===
Period	Live births	Deaths	Natural increase
January—December 2024	446,711	162,780	+283,931
January—December 2025	424,832	168,458	+256,374
Difference	▼ –21,879 (−4.9%)	▲ +5,678 (+3.5%)	▼ –27,557

=== UN estimates ===
Registration of vital events in Peru is not complete. The Population Departement of the United Nations prepared the following estimates.

Period	Live births per year	Deaths per year	Natural change per year	CBR*	CDR*	NC*	TFR*	IMR*
1950–1955	394000	179000	215000	47.8	21.7	26.1	6.95	164
1955–1960	446000	187000	259000	47.3	19.8	27.5	6.95	152
1960–1965	506000	191000	315000	46.7	17.6	29.1	6.95	138
1965–1970	552000	195000	357000	44.3	15.7	28.6	6.70	128
1970–1975	577000	182000	395000	40.4	12.7	27.7	6.00	111
1975–1980	623000	177000	446000	38.3	10.9	27.4	5.40	99
1980–1985	628000	167000	461000	34.0	9.1	24.9	4.65	82
1985–1990	654000	161000	493000	31.6	7.8	23.8	4.10	68
1990–1995	658000	157000	501000	28.7	6.9	21.8	3.57	48
1995–2000	635000	152000	483000	25.4	6.1	19.3	3.10	39
2000–2005	615000	150000	465000	22.4	5.4	17.0	2.72	30
2005–2010	608000	158000	450000	21.9	5.3	16.6	2.68	21
2010–2015	619000	171000	448000	19.2	5.3	13.9	2.40	16
2015–2020	605000	181000	424000	18.1	5.5	12.6	2.27	13
2020–2025				16.9	5.9	11.0	2.16	
2025–2030				15.4	6.1	9.3	2.07	
* CBR = crude birth rate (per 1000); CDR = crude death rate (per 1000); NC = natural change (per 1000); IMR = infant mortality rate per 1000 births; TFR = total fertility rate (number of children per woman)

=== Demographic and Health Surveys ===
Total Fertility Rate (TFR) (Wanted Fertility Rate) and Crude Birth Rate (CBR):

Year	Total		Urban		Rural	
Year	CBR	TFR	CBR	TFR	CBR	TFR
1950–55	47.1	6.9				
1955–60	48.8	6.9				
1960–1965	46.3	6.9				
1965–70	43.6	6.6				
1970–1975	40.5	6.0				
1975–1980	38.0	5.4				
1980–1985	36.7	5.0				
1985–1990	34.3	4.5				
1986		4.12 (2.64)				6.34 (3.66)
1991–1992	27.8	3.5 (2.0)	23.5	2.8 (1.7)	38.7	6.2 (3.0)
1996	27.4	3.5 (2.2)	24.2	2.8 (1.9)	33.5	5.6 (3.1)
2000	22	2.9 (1.8)	19	2.2 (1.5)	27	4.3 (2.5)
2004–2006	19.2	2.6 (1.7)	17.3	2.1 (1.5)	22.6	3.7 (2.2)
2007–2008	18.6	2.5 (1.6)	16.8	2.1 (1.5)	22.2	3.7 (2.0)
2009	19.9	2.6 (1.8)	18.7	2.3 (1.7)	22.8	3.6 (2.1)
2010	19.0	2.5 (1.8)	17.6	2.2 (1.6)	22.3	3.5 (2.1)
2011	19.7	2.6 (1.8)	18.5	2.3 (1.7)	22.5	3.5 (2.1)
2012	19.6	2.6 (1.8)	18.5	2.3 (1.7)	22.3	3.5 (2.1)
2013	18.4	2.4 (1.7)	17.1	2.1 (1.6)	22.3	3.4 (2.1)
2014	19.1	2.5 (1.8)	18.3	2.3 (1.7)	21.7	3.3 (2.2)
2017–2018		2.2		2.0		3.1

=== Life expectancy ===
Life expectancy in Peru since 1940

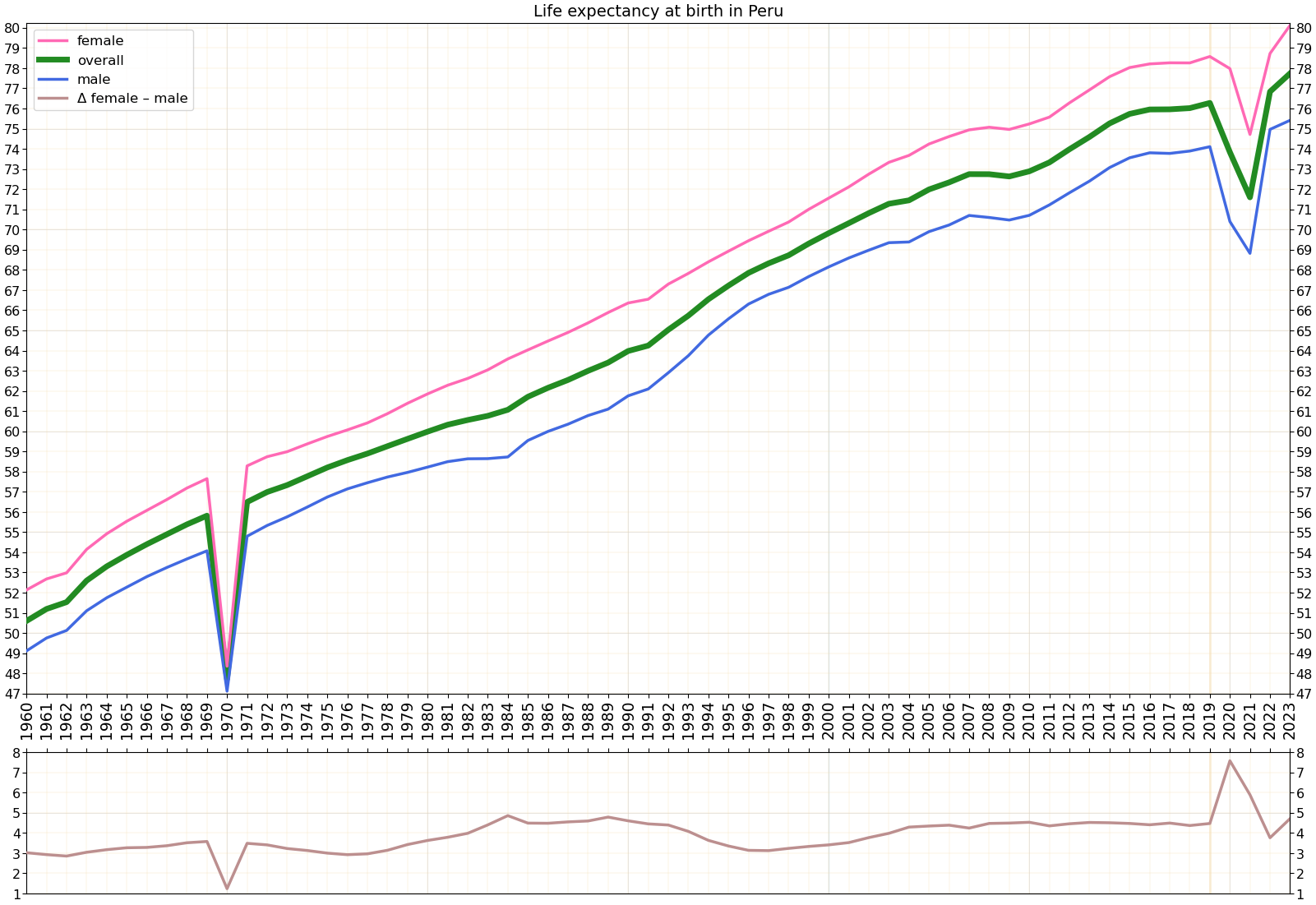
Life expectancy in Peru since 1960 by gender

Period	Life expectancy in Years	Period	Life expectancy in Years
1950–1955	43.9	1985–1990	64.3
1955–1960	46.3	1990–1995	66.7
1960–1965	49.1	1995–2000	69.3
1965–1970	51.5	2000–2005	71.7
1970–1975	55.6	2005–2010	73.1
1975–1980	58.5	2010–2015	74.2
1980–1985	61.6		

Source: UN World Population Prospects

== Ethnic groups ==
Racial groups in Peru (2017 census)
1. Mestizos (60.2%)
2. Indigenous (25.8%)
3. Whites (5.89%)
4. Blacks (3.57%)
5. East Asians (0.16%)
6. Others (4.42%)

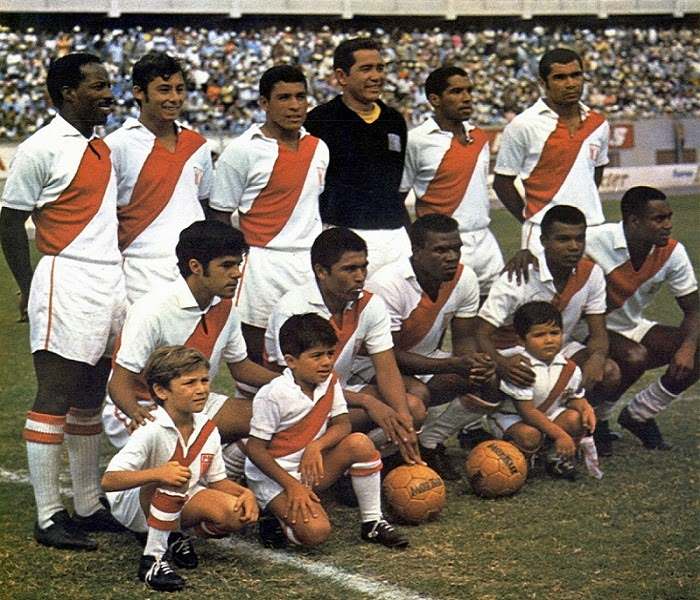
Peru's football team in 1970; the ethnic diversity of Peruvians is visible, with players showing African, Amerindian and European ancestry in various mixes.

Peru is a multiethnic country formed by the amalgamation of different cultures and ethnicities over thousands of years. Amerindians inhabited the land for over ten millennia before the Spanish conquest in the 16th century; their cultures and influence represent the foundation of today's Peru.

As a result of European contact and conquest, the population of the area now known as Peru decreased from an estimated 9 million in the 1520s to around 600,000 in 1620. This happened mostly because of the unintended spread of germs and infectious diseases. In fact, the spread of smallpox greatly weakened the Inca empire, even before the Spanish arrival. The Amerindians did not have as much natural immunity to the disease as did the Europeans. For this reason, several Amerindian populations were decimated. Furthermore, the disease killed Inca ruler Wayna Capac, triggering a civil war in the Inca empire that preceded the conquest efforts the Spaniards. Thus, the conquest was facilitated by the weakness of the Inca empire which was recovering from both a civil war and epidemics of unknown diseases.

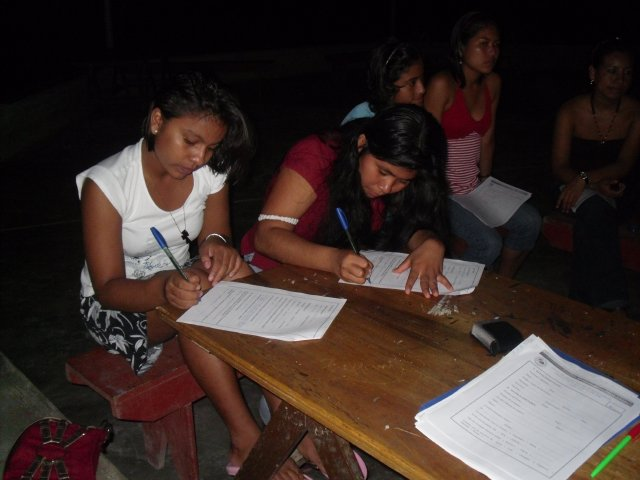
Peruvian girls

However, other reasons for the decrease of Amerindian population include violence during the conquest followed by the breakdown of the Inca social system and famine. The Amerindian population suffered further decrease as the Spanish exploited an Inca communal labor system called mita for mining purposes, thus killing thousands in forced labor.

Spaniards arrived in small numbers under colonial rule. After independence, there has been a gradual European immigration from Austria, England, Scotland, France, Germany, Italy, Croatia and Spain. Polynesians also came to the country lured to work in the Guano islands during the boom years of this commodity around the 1860s. Chinese arrived in the 1850s as a replacement for slave workers in the sugar plantations of the north coast and have since become a major influence in Peruvian society. Other immigrant groups include Arabs (namely from Levant/West Asian countries), South Asians, Japanese, Americans and Colombians.

Since 2014, Peru has experienced a massive rise in the immigrant population from nearby Venezuela. In May 2023, the estimated population of Venezuelans in Peru is 1,600,000, being the second most popular destination for Venezuelans after Colombia.

Mestizos compose about 60% of the total population. The term traditionally denotes Amerindian (mostly Quechua ancestry) and European ancestry (mostly Spaniard ancestry). This term, was part of the caste classification during colonial times, whereby people of exclusive Spanish descent but born in the colonies were called criollos, people of mixed Amerindian and Spanish descent were called mestizos, those of African and Spanish descent were called mullatoes, and those of Amerindian and African descent were called Zambos. Some mestizos are urban dwellers and show some European inheritance in regions like Lima Region, La Libertad Region, Callao Region, San Martín Region, Cajamarca Region, Piura Region, Amazonas Region, Lambayeque Region, and Arequipa Region.

Amerindians constitute around 25% of the total population. The two major indigenous or ethnic groups are the Quechuas (belonging to various cultural subgroups), followed by the Aymaras, mostly found in the extreme southern Andes. A large proportion of the indigenous population who live in the Andean highlands still speak Quechua and have vibrant cultural traditions, some of which were part of the Inca Empire. Dozens of indigenous cultures are also dispersed throughout the country beyond the Andes Mountains in the Amazon basin. This region is rapidly becoming urbanized. Important urban centers include Iquitos, Nauta, Puerto Maldonado, Pucallpa and Yurimaguas. This region is home to numerous indigenous peoples, though they do not constitute a large proportion of the total population. Examples of indigenous peoples residing in eastern Peru include the Shipibo, Urarina, Cocama, and Aguaruna, to name just a few.

European descendants constitute around 6% of the total population. They are descendants of the Spanish conquerors and other Europeans such as Germans, Italians, British, French, and Croatians (see also Croats) who arrived in the 19th and 20th centuries. The majority of them live also in the largest cities (like mestizos), usually in the North and Center of Peru: Lima, Trujillo, Chiclayo, Piura, and through all the highlands of Northwest, like Amazonas, Cajamarca and San Martin. A Southern city with a significant white population is Arequipa.

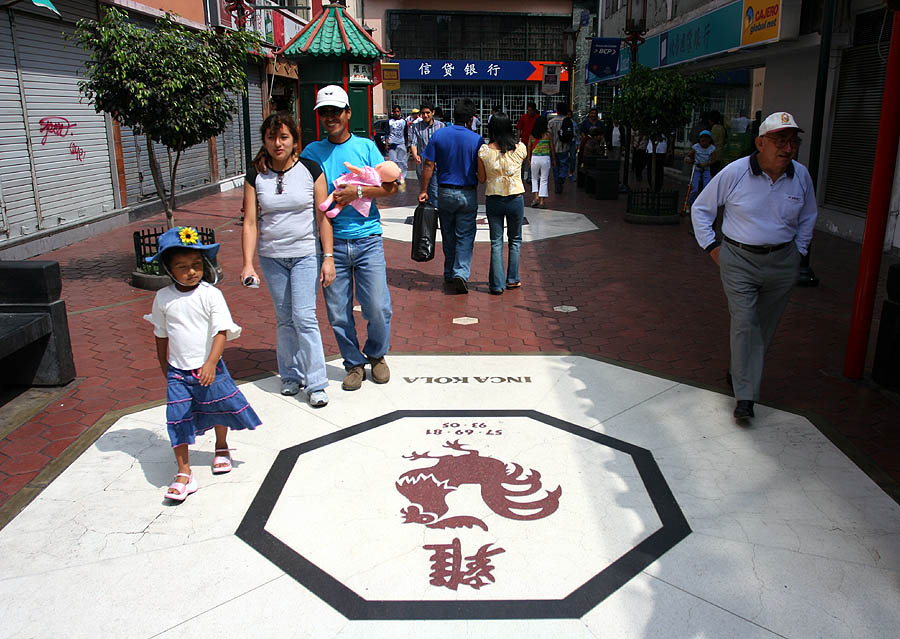
Chinatown in Lima

There is also a presence of Asian Peruvians, who are primarily of Chinese and Japanese origin, constituting less than 1% of the population. Peru has the second largest population of people of Japanese descent in Latin America after Brazil and the largest population of Chinese descent in Latin America. Historic communities inhabited by people of Chinese descent are found throughout the Peruvian upper Amazon, including cities such as Yurimaguas, Nauta, Iquitos and the north central coast (Lambayeque and Trujillo). In contrast to the Japanese community in Peru, the Chinese appear to have intermarried much more since they came to work in the rice fields during the Viceroyalty and to replace the African slaves, during the abolition of slavery itself. Other Asian communities include small numbers of West Asian/Arab Peruvians, mostly of Lebanese and Syrian origin, and Palestinians, as well a small community of South Asians, namely of Indian and Pakistani background. There have been several notable Peruvian politicians of Asian heritage, notable past president (Alberto Fujimori), who is of Japanese origin, as well as Omar Chehade, of Lebanese heritage and served as the Second Vice President of Peru from 2011 to 2012.

The remaining is constituted by Afro-Peruvians, a legacy of Peru's history as an importer of slaves during the colonial period. Today mulattos (mixed African and European) and zambos (mixed African and Amerindian) also constitute an important part of the population, especially in Piura, Tumbes, Lambayeque, Lima and Ica regions. The Afro-Peruvian population is concentrated mostly in coastal cities south of Lima, such as those found in the Ica Region, in cities like Cañete, Chincha, Ica, Nazca and Acarí in the Arequipa Region. Another large but poorly promoted segment of Afro-Peruvian presence is in the Yunga regions (west and just below the Andean chain of northern Peru), (i.e., Piura and Lambayeque), where sugarcane, lemon, and mango production are still of importance. Important communities are found all over the Morropón Province, such as in the city of Chulucanas. One of them is Yapatera, a community in the same city, as well as smaller farming communities like Pabur or La Matanza and even in the mountainous region near Canchaque. Further south, the colonial city of Zaña or farming towns like Capote and Tuman in Lambayeque are also important regions with Afro-Peruvian presence.

Socioeconomic and cultural indicators are increasingly important as identifiers. For example, Peruvians of Amerindian descent who have adopted aspects of Hispanic culture also are beginning to consider themselves "mestizo". With economic development, access to education, intermarriage, and large-scale migration from rural to urban areas, a more homogeneous national culture is developing, mainly along the relatively more prosperous coast.

The Lima-Callao Metropolitan area is home to over 11 million residents, being one of South America's largest urban areas as well as one of the five megacities in the continent.

== Language ==
Languages of Perú
Languages	percent
Spanish	82.6%
Quechua	13.9%
Aymara	1.7%
Other indigenous language	0.8%

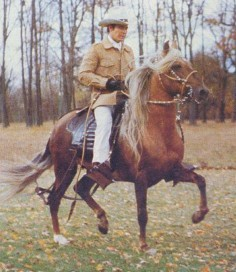
Peruvian Paso

According to the Peruvian Constitution of 1993, Peru's official languages are Spanish, Quechua, Aymara, and other indigenous languages in areas where they predominate. Today, Spanish is spoken by some 83.9% of the population. It is used by the government and the media and in education and commerce. Amerindians who live in the Andean highlands speak Quechua and Aymara and are ethnically distinct from the diverse indigenous groups who live on the eastern side of the Andes and in the tropical lowlands adjacent to the Amazon basin.

Peru's distinct geographical regions are mirrored in a socioeconomic divide between the coast's Hispanic mestizo culture and the more diverse, traditional Andean cultures of the mountains and highlands. The indigenous populations east of the Andes speak various languages and dialects. Some of these groups still adhere to traditional customs, while others have been almost completely assimilated into the Hispanic mestizo culture.

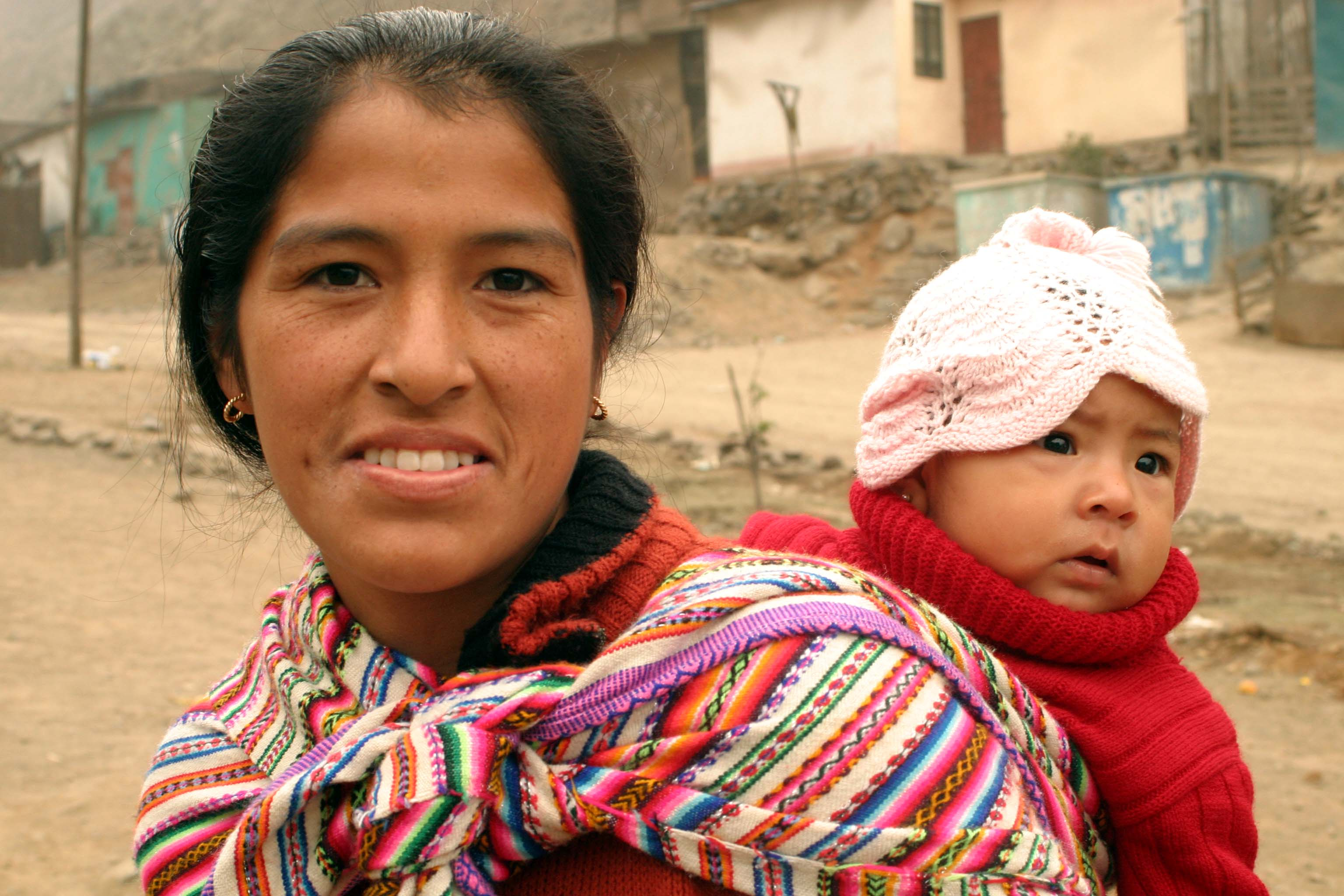
Amerindian woman with child

According to official sources, the use of Spanish has increased while the knowledge and use of indigenous languages have decreased considerably during the last four decades (1960–2000). At the beginning of the 1960s some 39% of the total Peruvian population were registered as speakers of indigenous languages, but by the 1990s the figures show a considerable decline in the use of Quechua, Aymara, and other indigenous languages, when only 28% is registered as Quechua-speaking (16% of whom are reported to be bilingual in Spanish) and Spanish-speakers increased to 72%.

For 2017, government figures place Spanish as being spoken by 82.6% of the population, but among Amerindian languages, another decrease is registered. Of the indigenous languages, Quechua remains the most spoken, and even today is used by some 13.9% of the total Peruvian population or a third of Peru's total indigenous population. The number of speakers of Aymara and other indigenous languages is placed at 2.5%, and those of foreign languages at 0.2%.

The drastic decline in use and knowledge of indigenous languages is largely attributed to recent demographic factors. The urbanization and assimilation of Peru's Amerindian plurality into the Hispanic mestizo culture, as well as new socioeconomic factors associated with class structure, have given privilege to the use of Spanish at the expense of the Amerindian languages which were spoken by the majority of the population less than a century ago.

The major obstacle to a more widespread use of Quechua is the fact that multiple varieties of this language exist. Quechua, along with Aymara and the minor indigenous languages, was originally and remains essentially an oral language. As a result, there is a lack of modern media which use it, such as books, newspapers, software, magazines, and technical journals. However, non-governmental organizations, as well as state-sponsored groups, are involved in projects to edit and translate major works into Quechua; for instance, in late 2005 a version of Don Quixote was presented in the language. There has also been an increasing and organized effort to teach Quechua in public schools in the areas where it is spoken.

The percentage of native speakers of Quechua who are illiterate was decreasing as of 2008, as 86.87% of the Peruvian population is literate. More encouraging, nationwide literacy rate of youth aged 15 to 24 years is high and considered an achievement in Peruvian educational standards.

As part of the recent push in Peru to recognize and integrate indigenous people into national life, the government of Pedro Pablo Kuczynski supported the use of indigenous languages in Peru, with the state-run TV station starting to broadcast in December 2016 a daily news program in Quechua and in April 2017 one in Aymara. The President's state-of-the-union address was simultaneously translated into Quechua in July 2017. As of 2016, government figures show about 4 million (13 percent) of the population speak Quechua fluently, while up to 10 million – around a third of the population – understand some of the language.

== See also ==
- Afro-Peruvians
- Asian Peruvians
- British Peruvian
- European Peruvians
- Indigenous peoples in Peru
- Languages of Peru
- Peruvian people
- Religion in Peru
- Roman Catholicism by country
