= Chinese Peruvians =

Ethnic group

秘魯華人（秘魯中國人） Tusán (土生)
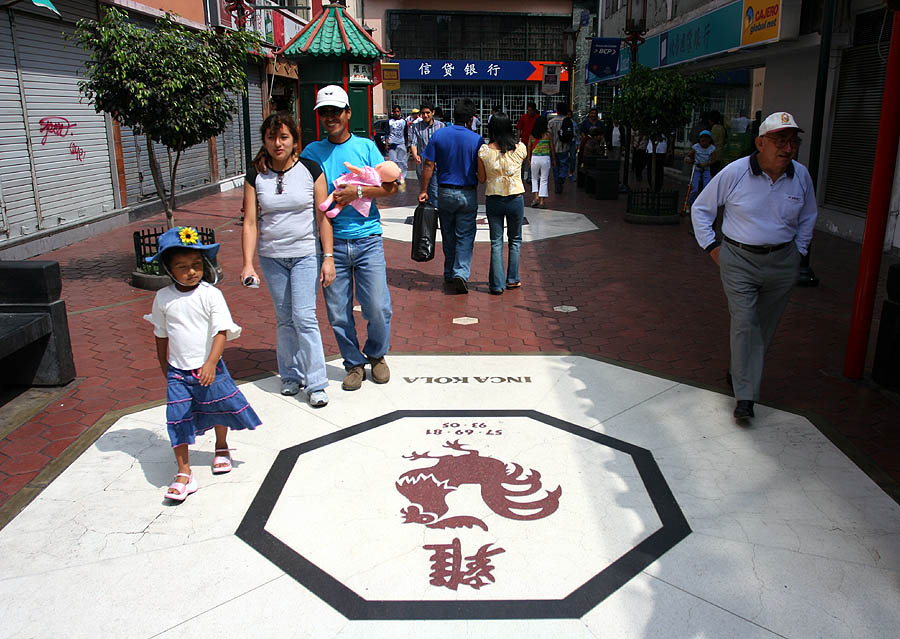
- Chinatown of Lima

Total population
- 14,307 by self-reported ancestry according to the Peruvian National Census (2017). 2,500,000 estimated with Chinese ancestry (2017).

Regions with significant populations
- Lima, Huacho, Ica, Piura, Huancayo, Cusco, Moyobamba, Tarapoto, Iquitos

Languages
- Peruvian Spanish, Cantonese, Hakka, Mandarin, Hokkien

Religion
- Mostly Roman Catholicism, Protestantism and Buddhism

Related ethnic groups
- Asian Latin Americans, Asian Peruvians

Chinese Peruvians
- Traditional Chinese: 秘魯華僑華人
- Simplified Chinese: 秘鲁华侨华人
Transcriptions
Standard Mandarin
- Hanyu Pinyin: Bìlǔ Huáqiáo Huárén
Yue: Cantonese
- Jyutping: bei^{3}lou^{5} waa^{4}kiu^{4} waa^{4}jan^{4}

Tusán
- Chinese: 土生
- Literal meaning: Local-born
Transcriptions
Standard Mandarin
- Hanyu Pinyin: tǔ shēng
Yue: Cantonese
- Jyutping: tou^{2} saang^{1}

Chinese Peruvians, also known as tusán (a loanword from Chinese: 土生; pinyin: tǔ shēng; Jyutping: tou2 saang1; Cantonese Yale: tóu sāng; lit. 'local born') are Peruvians whose forebears immigrated from China and who form a distinct cultural community within Peru.

Due to acculturation, most third- and fourth-generation Chinese Peruvians do not speak the language of their ancestors. However, some second generation Chinese Peruvians can speak one or more varieties of Chinese that may include Mandarin, Cantonese, Hakka and Minnan (Hokkien), in addition to Spanish.

Outside of the predominant Amerindian, mestizo, white, and black populations, Chinese are estimated to constitute less than 0.1% of the Peruvian population. In the 2017 Census in Peru, only 14,307 people claimed tusán or Chinese ancestry. However, according to the embassy, it was estimated that 15% (or 4 million) of the 30 million Peruvians had Chinese roots and ancestry, tracing back to the 19th century arrival of 100,000 Chinese immigrants that migrated to Peru and entered relationships with many Peruvian women.

Peru has the largest number of people with Chinese descent in Latin America, with 3 million Peruvians of partial or full Chinese ancestry.

== History ==
=== Early history ===
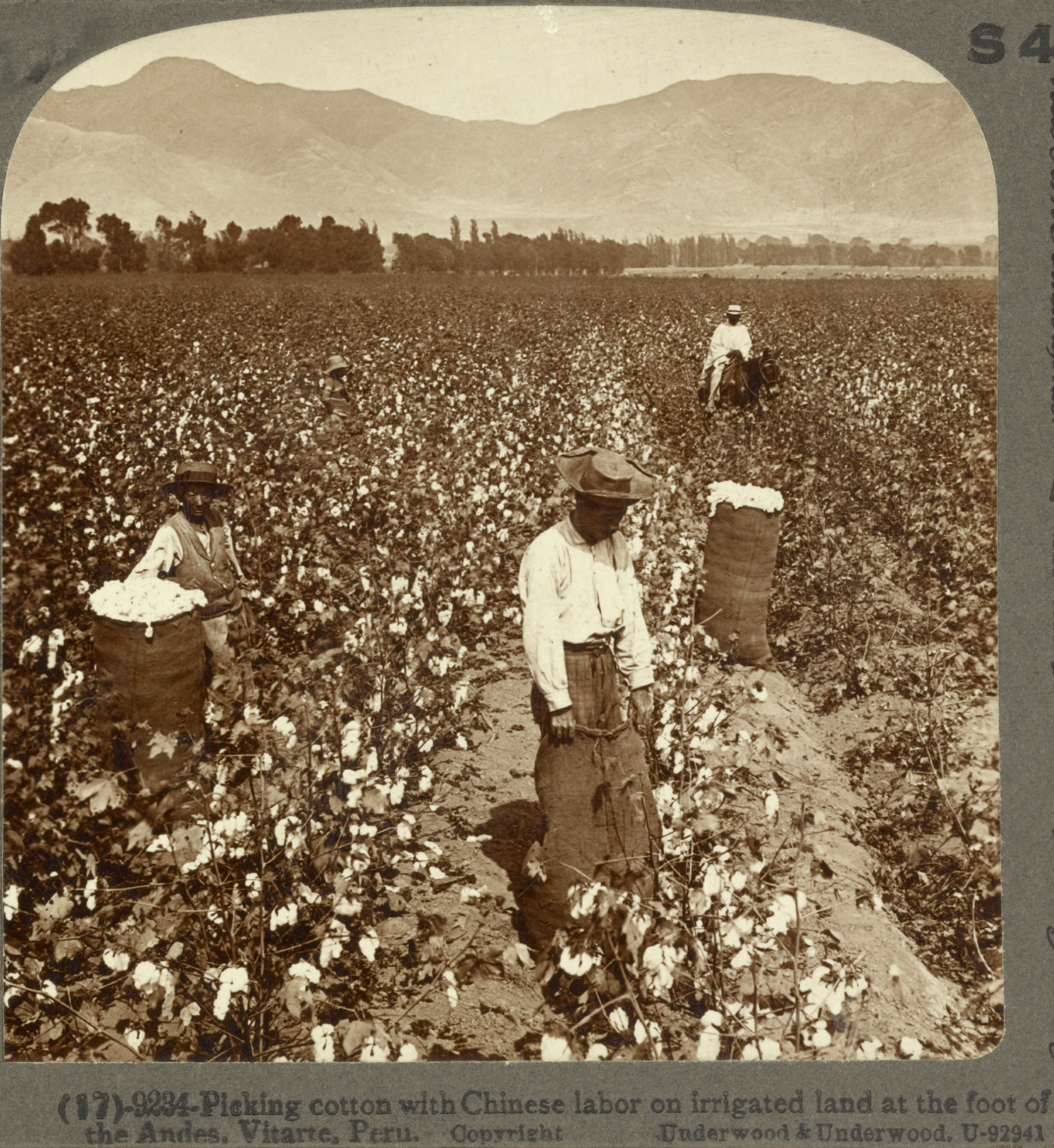
Chinese laborers in Peru - 1890

Workers who were shipped from the Spanish Philippines to Acapulco via the Manila-Acapulco galleons were all called Chino ("Chinese"), although in reality they were not only from China but also other places, including what are today the Philippines itself, Japan, Malaysia, Indonesia, East Timor and further afield such as India and Sri Lanka. Filipinos made up most of their population. The people in this community of diverse Asians in Mexico were called "los indios chinos" by the Spanish. Most of these workers were male and were obtained from Portuguese traders, who obtained them from Portuguese colonial possessions and outposts of the Estado da India, which included parts of India, Bengal, Malacca, Indonesia, Nagasaki in Japan and Macau. Spain received some of these coolies from Mexico, where owning a Chino coolie showed high status. Records of three Japanese coolies dating from the 16th century, named Gaspar Fernandes, Miguel and Ventura who ended up in Mexico showed that they were purchased by Portuguese slave traders in Japan, brought to Manila from where they were shipped to Mexico by their owner Perez. Some of these Asian slaves were also brought to Lima in Peru, where it was recorded that in 1613 there was a small community of Asians, consisting of Chinese, Japanese, Filipinos, Malays, Cambodians and others.

Chinese immigrants, who in the 19th century took a four-month trip from Macau (then a Portuguese territory), settled as contract laborers or coolies. Other Chinese coolies from Guangdong followed. 80,000 to 100,000 Chinese contract laborers, 95% of which were Cantonese and almost all of which were male, were sent mostly to the sugar plantations from 1849 to 1874, during the termination of slavery. They were to provide continuous labor for the coastal guano mines and especially for the coastal plantations where they became a major labor force (contributing greatly to the Peruvian guano boom) until the end of the century. While the coolies were believed to be reduced to virtual slaves, they also represented a historical transition from slave to free labor. A third group of Chinese workers was contracted for the construction of the railway from Lima to La Oroya and Huancayo. Chinese migrants were barred from using cemeteries reserved for Roman Catholics and were instead buried at pre-Incan burial sites. Between 1849 and 1874 half the Chinese population of Peru perished due to abuse, exhaustion and suicide caused by forced labor.

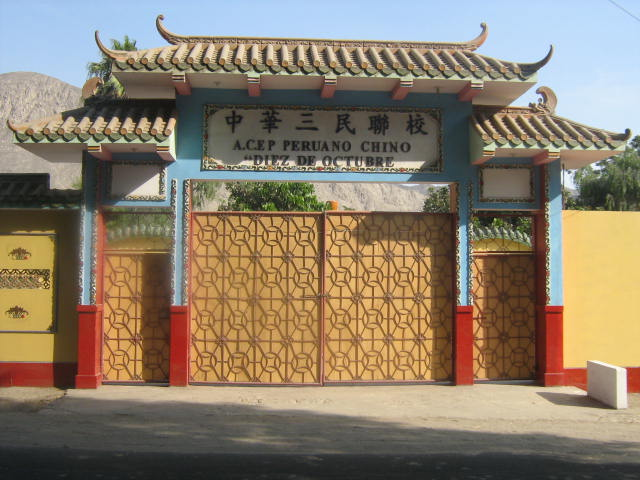
Diez de Octubre School in Peru

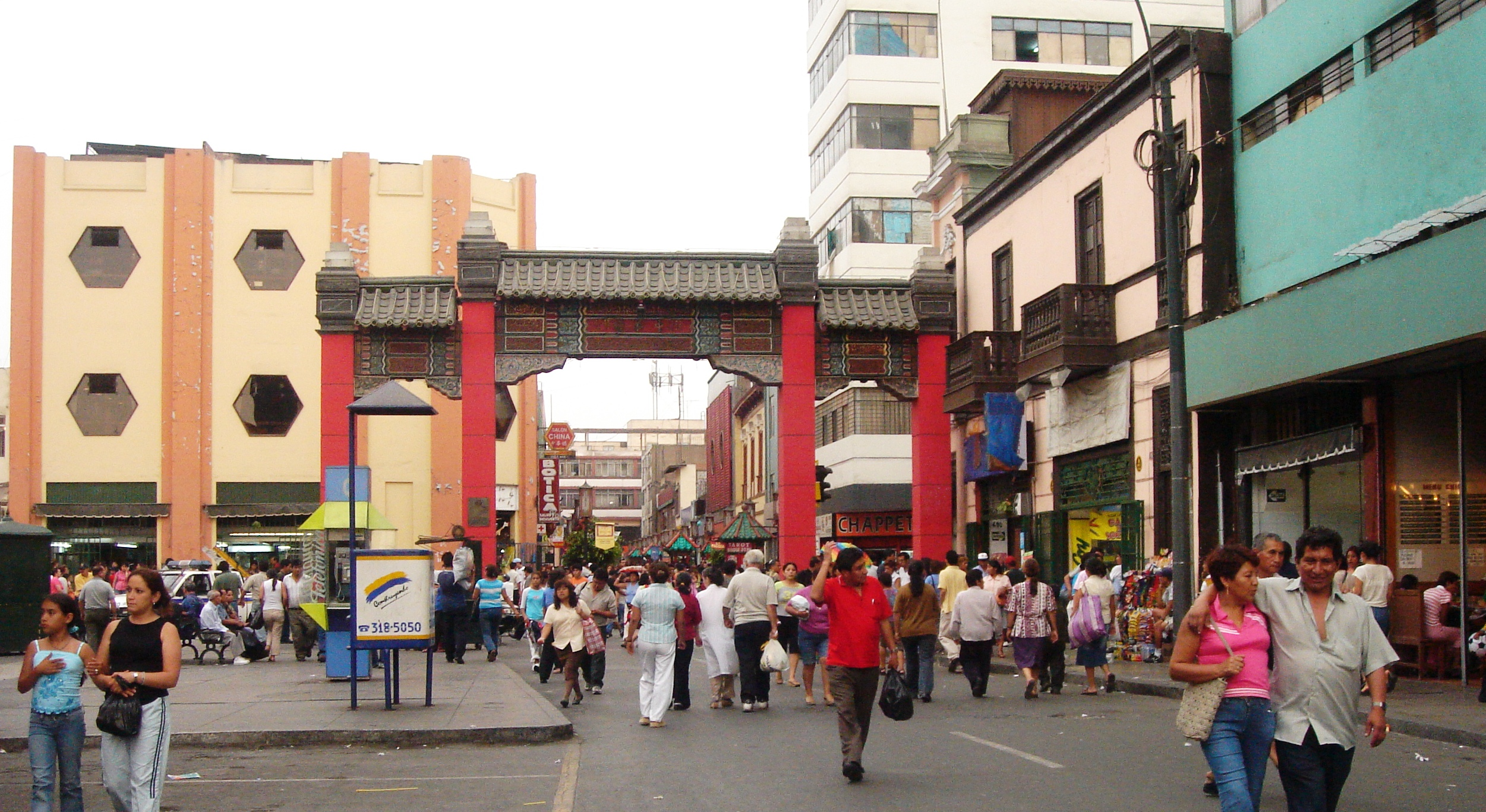
Chinatown in Lima

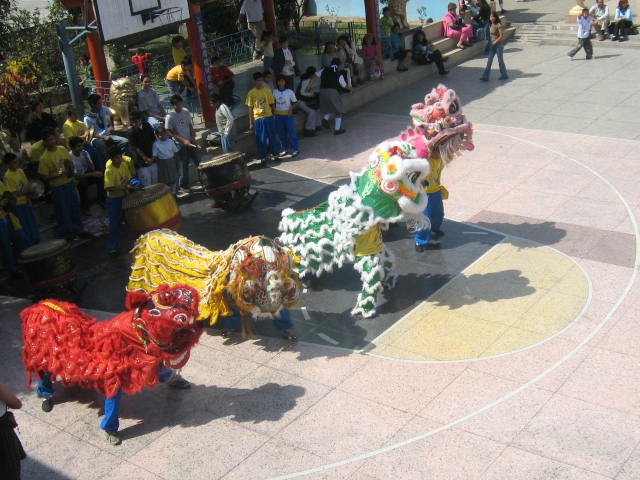
Chinese Community in Peru - Dance of the Lion

There were almost no women among the nearly entirely male Chinese coolie population that migrated to Peru and Cuba. Peruvian women were married to these Chinese male migrants.

Interracial marriages between Cantonese-Chinese males and Peruvian females was quite large resulting in large number of mixed children and people with some Chinese ancestry in Peru. There is no prevailing racist attitude against intermarriage between the Chinese and non-Chinese in Peru, so the number of interracial marriages is quite large. According to one source, the number of mix raced children born was 180,000. Half of that number was in Lima alone, with the ratio between Chinese mestizo and the full-blooded Chinese at 90,000 to 15,000 (6:1). The recent census only estimates 14,307 Peruvians of Chinese descent (2017).

Many Peruvian women of different origins married to these Chinese male migrants. Most of the women that married Chinese were Amerindians (including Mestiza) and Black. Some lower class white women also married Chinese men but in a lower ratio. Chinese had contact with Peruvian women in cities; there they formed relationships and sired mixed babies. These women originated from Andean and coastal areas and did not originally come from the cities; in the haciendas on the coast in rural areas, native young women of indígenas ("native") and serranas ("mountain") origin from the Andes mountains would come down to work. These Andean native women were favored over Africans as marital partners by Chinese men, with matchmakers arranging for communal marriages of Chinese men to young indígenas and serranas. There was a racist reaction by Peruvians to the marriages of Peruvian women and Chinese men. When native Peruvian women (cholas et natives, Indias, indígenas) and Chinese men had mixed children, the children were called injerto; once these injertos emerged, Chinese men sought out girls of injerta origin as marriage partners. Children born to black mothers were not called injertos. Peruvians of low class established sexual unions or marriages with the Chinese men, and some black and Indian women "bred" with the Chinese according to Alfredo Sachettí, who claimed the mixing was causing the Chinese to suffer from "progressive degeneration". In Casa Grande, highland Indian women and Chinese men participated in communal "mass marriages" with each other, arranged when highland women were brought by a Chinese matchmaker after receiving a down payment.

In Peru and Cuba, some Indian (Native American), mulatto, black, and white women engaged in carnal relations or marriages with Chinese men, with marriages of mulatto, black, and white woman being reported by the Cuba Commission Report. In Peru, it was reported by The New York Times that Peruvian black and Indian (Native) women married Chinese men to their own advantage and to the disadvantage of the men since they dominated and "subjugated" the Chinese men despite the fact that the labor contract was annulled by the marriage, reversing the roles in marriage with the Peruvian woman holding marital power, ruling the family and making the Chinese men slavish, docile, "servile", "submissive" and "feminine" and commanding them around, reporting that "Now and then...he [the Chinese man] becomes enamored of the charms of some sombre-hued chola (Native Indian and mestiza woman) or samba (mixed black woman), and is converted and joins the Church, so that may enter the bonds of wedlock with the dusky señorita." Chinese men were sought out as husbands and considered a "catch" by the "dusky damsels" (Peruvian women) because they were viewed as a "model husband, hard-working, affectionate, faithful and obedient" and "handy to have in the house", the Peruvian women became the "better half" instead of the "weaker vessel" and would command their Chinese husbands "around in fine style" instead of treating them equally, while the labor contract of the Chinese coolie would be nullified by the marriage, the Peruvian wife viewed the nullification merely as the previous "master" handing over authority over the Chinese man to her as she became his "mistress", keeping him in "servitude" to her, speedily ending any complaints and suppositions by the Chinese men that they would have any power in the marriage. Although Chinese Peruvians were well-integrated into Peruvian society, it did not come with an easy beginning.

== Pogroms during the War of the Pacific ==
During the War of the Pacific, Chinese laborers led an uprising in support of Chile against Peru. Peruvians held the Chinese responsible for the Chilean invading army, leading to an outbreak of Sinophobic violence, the first of its kind in Latin America. It was not until the 1890s that the anti-Chinese pogroms stopped, with total deaths numbering 10,000 to 30,000 Chinese people in Arequipa, Lima, Cañete, Trujillo, Piura and Cerro Azul. Pogroms would continue from 1929 to 1960, with 40,000 Chinese deaths by fascists and half of the Peruvian Army and Peruvian Navy. In one 1881 pogrom in the Cañete Valley it is estimated that 500 to 1,500 Chinese people were killed. Chinese people were barred from immigrating to the country until the 1970s.

== Chinese in 1900 ==
Another group of Chinese settlers came after the founding of Sun Yat-sen's republic in 1912, and another after the establishment of Communist rule in 1949. At the time of the Chinese Civil War, the Chinese community in Peru identified with the Nationalist government in Taipei, although as time passed, they became adherent to the government in Beijing instead.

In 1957, Cantonese speakers constituted 85 per cent of the total Chinese immigrant population, the rest of whom were Hakka speakers.

=== Modern-day immigration ===
Recent Chinese immigrants settled in Peru from Hong Kong and Macau in 1997 and 1999, owing to fear of those territories returning to Communist rule, while others have come from other places in mainland China, Taiwan, and southeast Asian Chinese communities, including those of Malaysia, Indonesia, Singapore and the Philippines. Many Chinese Indonesians came to Peru after anti-Chinese riots and massacres in those countries in the 1960s, 1970s, and late 1990s. These recent Chinese immigrants make Peru currently the home of the largest ethnically Chinese community in Latin America.

=== Emigration ===
Many Chinese Peruvians left Peru in the 1960s and 1970s. Most of them headed to the United States, where they were called Chinese Americans or Peruvian Americans of Chinese descent.

=== Role in the economy ===
After their contracts ended, many of them adopted the last name of their patrons (one of the reasons that many Chinese Peruvians carry Spanish last names). Some freed coolies (and later immigrants) established many small businesses. These included chifas (Chinese-Peruvian restaurants - the word is derived from Chinese term, 吃飯 (pinyin: chīfàn; Jyutping: hek^{3}faan^{6}) which means "to eat rice or to have a meal"). Calle Capón, Lima's Chinatown, also known as Barrio Chino de Lima, became one of the Western Hemisphere's earliest Chinatowns. The Chinese coolies married Peruvian women, and many Chinese Peruvians today are of mixed Chinese, Spanish, African or Native American descent. Chinese Peruvians also assisted in the building of railroad and development of the Amazon rainforest, where they tapped rubber trees, washed gold, cultivated rice, and traded with the natives. They even became the largest foreign colony in the Amazon capital of Iquitos by the end of the century.

In 1942, a Chinese-Peruvian, Erasmo Wong, started a small store in a residential district in Lima, which grew into a large supermarket chain in Peru known as Wong supermarkets. Wong supermarkets was later acquired by the Chilean multinational retail company Cencosud on December 16, 2007, helping it grow further.

== Notable people ==
The majority of Chinese descendants in Peru do not carry a Chinese surname, since their ancestors, when they arrived in Peru, were baptized or adopted the surnames of their patrons, Catholic saints or some very common Castilian surname.

=== Politics and business ===
- Luis Chang Reyes 陈路 (engineer, minister of state and ambassador)
- Ephraim Wong Lu (businessman)
- Enrique Wong (congressman)
- Erasmus Wong Lu (businessman)
- Erick Chuy (businessman, accountant, missionary)
- Eugenio Chang Cruz (lawyer, professor and senator)
- Felipe Tam Fox (administrator, official and former head of the SBS)
- Humberto Lay Sun (congressman)
- Isabel Wong-Vargas (businesswoman)
- Jesús Wu (businessman)
- José Antonio Chang (industrial and political engineer)
- Juan Pablo Chang Navarro (politician)
- Julio Chávez Chiong (mayor)
- Julio Chú Mériz (politician)
- Magdalena Chú (Statistical expert and former head of the ONPE)
- Nelson Chui Mejía (former president of the Lima Region)
- Rolando Martel Chang (Superior Judge of Lima and professor)
- Rosario López Wong (Superior Criminal Prosecutor of Lima)
- Rubén Chang Gamarra (lawyer and politician)

=== Entertainment ===
- Aída Tam Fox (poet and historian of Peruvian cuisine)
- Alberto Ku King (journalist)
- Annie Yep (TV host, journalist, and model)
- Anthony Choy (lawyer and investigative journalist ufologist)
- Antonio Wong Rengifo (film director)
- Sui Yun (Katty Wong) (poet)
- Jonatan Relayze Chiang (filmmaker)
- Julio Villanueva Chang (journalist)
- María Inés Ching (journalist)
- Miguel Yi Carrillo (journalist)
- Milly Ahon Olguín (cultural historian)
- Mónica Chang (journalist)
- Patty Wong (model and TV presenter)
- Pedro Mo (rapper)
- Raúl Chang Ruiz (journalist, director of the Oriental Magazine)

=== Athletics ===
- Juan Chang (footballer and journalist)
- Héctor Cruz (soccer player)
- Jorge Koochoi (footballer, 8 times national champion)
- Patty Ku (tennis player)
- Carmen Kuong (footballer)
- Mariano Loo (footballer)
- Julio Lores (footballer)
- Iván Miranda (tennis player)
- Katherine Miranda (tennis player)
- Luis Pau (footballer)
- Edwin Vásquez (Olympic champion in shooting, London 1948)
- Freddy Wong (skateboarder)
- Augusto Yep (footballer)

=== Culture ===
- Alejandro Chu (archaeologist)
- Apu-Rimak (plastic artist)
- Carolina Chang Tam (keyboard player)
- Celia Wu Brading (historian and translator)
- Emilio Choy Ma (social scientist)
- Javier Wong (chef)
- Julia Wong Kcomt (writer)
- Juan Wong Paredes (musician)
- Juan Wong Popolizio (musician)
- Julio Mau (singer)
- Mao Wong López (musician)
- Marcelo Wong (plastic artist)
- Rosa Fung Pineda (archaeologist)
- Lucero Medina Hu (theatre director and playwright)

=== Other ===
- Alejandro Chung Hernández (teacher)
- Alicia Garcia Yi (teacher, CCPCH director) )
- Eugenio Chang-Rodríguez (linguist and professor)
- Jorge Céliz Kuong (general)
- José Gallardo Ku (economist)
- Olga Lock Sing (chemical and scientific engineer)
- Óscar Tang Cruz (physicist and professor)
- Pedro Zulen (philosopher and librarian)
- Raúl Chau Quispe (Auxiliary Bishop of Lima)
- Johnny Ching Paravecino (Teacher-Researcher)

== See also ==
- Asian Latin Americans
- China–Peru relations
- Chinatown, Lima
- Chinatowns in Latin America
- History of Peru
- Japanese Peruvians
- Overseas Chinese
