= Islam in Peru =

Peruvian Muslims
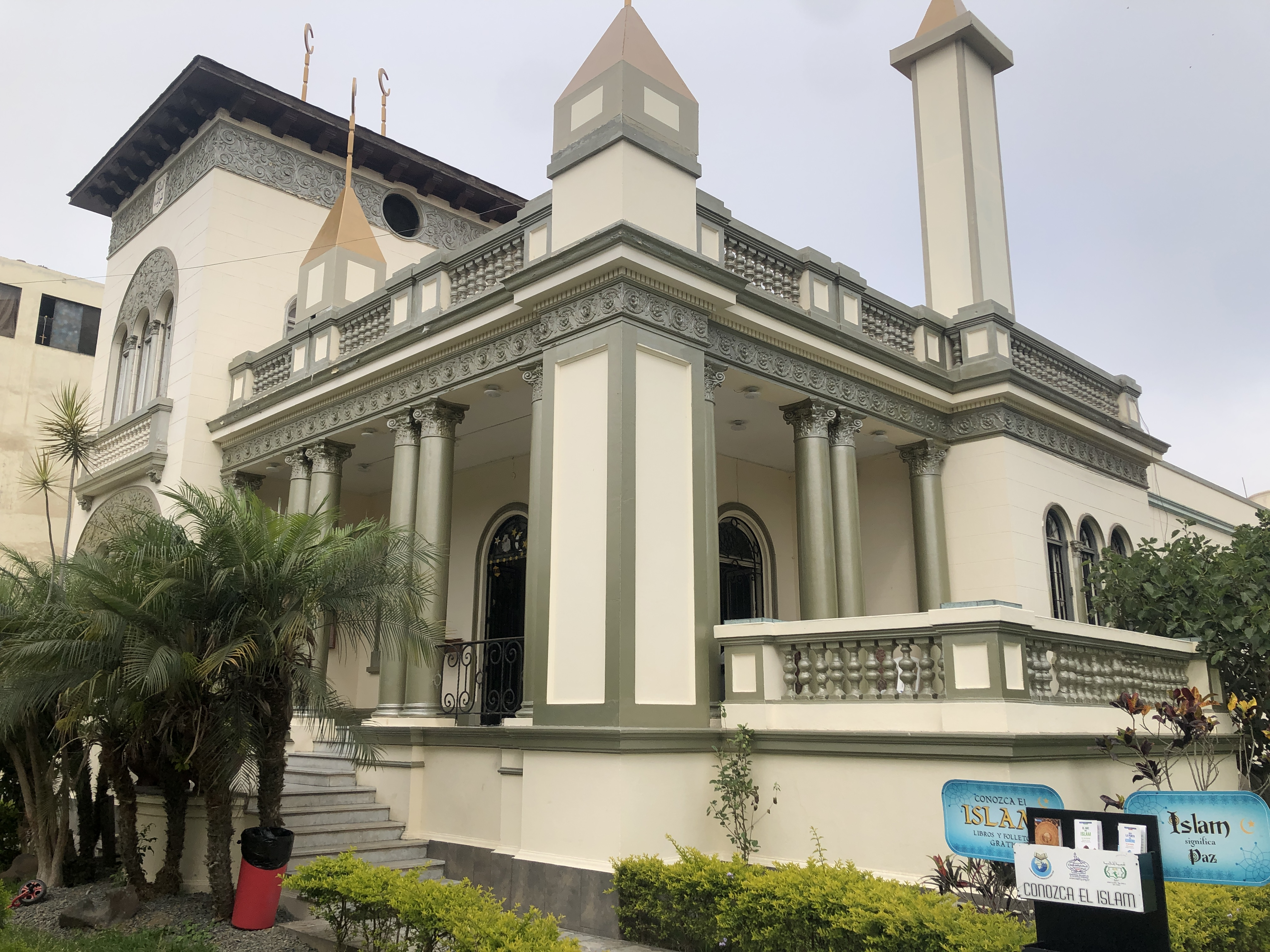
- The Mosque of Magdalena del Mar in Lima

Total population
- c. 2,600 (0.005%)

Regions with significant populations
- Mostly in Lima and other urban areas

Religions
- Sunni Islam

Languages
- National language; Peruvian Spanish; Regional and minority languages; Arabic; Bengali; Indigenous Peruvian languages

The statistics for Islam in Peru estimate a total Muslim population of 2,600 largely based in the capital city Lima; this represents 0.015% out of total population of 32,555,000 inhabitants.

== History ==
In 1560, the Spanish rulers of Peru sentenced Lope de la Pena, described as a "Moor from Guadalajara", to life imprisonment for the crime of "having practiced and spread Islam" in Cuzco and was also required to wear the Sanbenito around his neck for his entire imprisonment. Other sources give his name as Alvaro Gonzalez.

His colleague, the mulatto "son of a Spaniard [Juan Solano] and a black woman", Luis Solano was similarly convicted of spreading Islam, but was executed for the offence.

As persecution increased in the Spanish dependencies, Muslims ceased identifying themselves by their religion and became nominal Christians; eventually Islam disappeared from the country entirely.

In 1911, Stuart McNairn, a British missionary based in Cusco, wrote about "God's call to His Church to go in and possess the land [in] Africa, in view of the great Moslem advance. We must take the Light to the Dark Continent before the apostles of Mohammedanism enshroud it in yet greater darkness".

Islam was reintroduced to Peru in the 1940s during the Palestinian exodus by Palestinian and Lebanese Muslims fleeing from the Arab-Israeli war.

In 1974, the Nation of Islam, through its counterpart in Belize, began importing Pacific Whiting fish from Peru to the United States, where it was sold as an Islamic alternative to mainstream fish markets.

A Peruvian by the name of Louis Castro converted to Islam and later studied at the Islamic University of Madinah in the 1980s. In 1993, the Muslim community opened a mosque in the Jesús María District of the capital, but it was later closed due to financial difficulty. Another location was opened in the Villa El Salvador district, but met with similar difficulties and also closed.

=== Recent history ===
Historical population
Year	Population	±%
1980	5,000	—
1997	15,200	+204.0%

There are a handful of Islamic organizations in Peru, including the Asociación Islámica del Perú, the Musulmanes Peruanos of Naqshbandi Haqqani Tariqa and Asociación Islam Peru, in Lima.

In 2007, there were unsubstantiated claims that Islamist militant sympathisers were helping arrange entrance to the United States through their country.

The Latin American Muslim Unity (LAMU) organization, based in Fresno, California, United States, has drawn up a proposal for the first Islamic orphanage in Peru, although it has not yet materialized.

In January 2011, Peru joined a number of other Latin American countries in announcing its recognition of the State of Palestine as a legitimate nation. This decade also marked a migration of Muslims from Bangladesh and other Asian countries to Peru as well.

In 2016, Lebanese Shiite group Hezbollah announced the establishment of a local branch, based in Apurímac.

== See also ==
- Latin American Muslims
- Arab Peruvians
- Mosque of Lima
- Latino Muslims
- Religion in Peru
