= Irreligion in Peru =

Irreligion in Peru refers to atheism, deism, religious skepticism, secularism, and agnosticism in Peruvian society. According to article 2 of the Peruvian Constitution: "No person shall be persecuted on the basis of his ideas or beliefs". According to the 2017 Peruvian Census data, 1,180,361 Peruvians or 5.1% of the population older than 12 years old describe themselves as being irreligious, but some sources put this number higher at 8.2%. The Christian Post in 2026 reported that 7% of Peru identified as atheist or had no religion.

The irreligious population is predominantly urban (85,5% live in cities) and males (61,4% are male), and most are young people within the ages between 18 and 29 (40,4%). Only 11,8% of irreligious people are 50 years old or older.

Even though Peru is considered to be a Secular state, according to article 50 of the Peruvian Constitution the subject of Roman Catholicism is mandatory in Peruvian public schools. Many non-profit organizations promote the removal of the subject of Roman Catholicism in public schools, such as the Secular Humanist Society of Peru, or the Association of Peruvian Atheists.

== See also ==
- Demographics of Peru
- Irreligion in Latin America
- Irreligion in Mexico
- Irreligion in Uruguay
- Religion in Peru
