= Asian Peruvians =

Peruvians of Asian ancestry and heritage

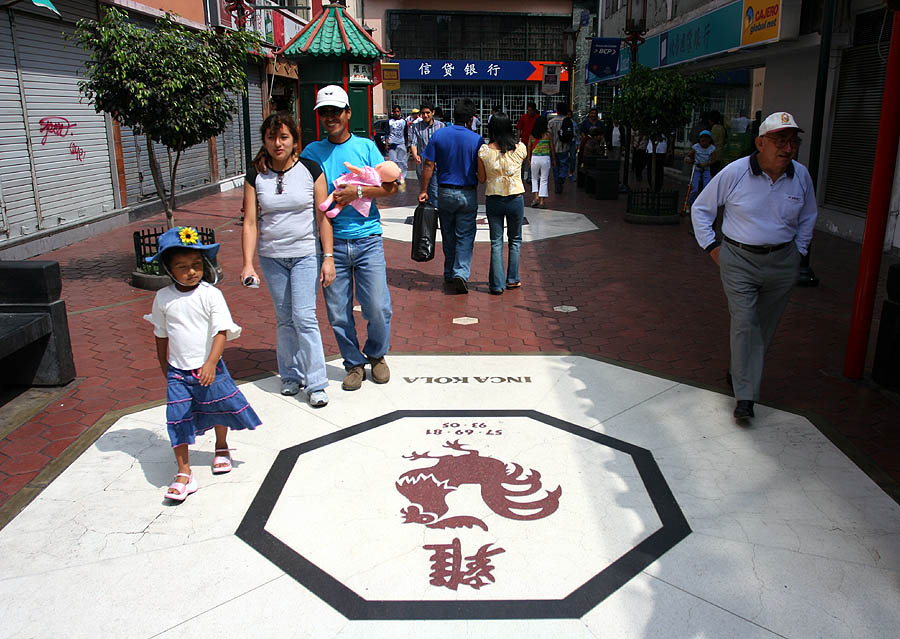
- Chinatown of Lima

Total population
- 36,757 self-reported having Nikkei (Japanese) or Tusán (Chinese) ancestry (2017 census); 0.2% of Peru's population estimates Japanese: 160,000 (2015)

Regions with significant populations
- Lima · La Libertad · Lambayeque

Languages
- Spanish · Chinese · Japanese · Korean · Indian languages · Arabic · Filipino

Religion
- Buddhism · Catholicism · Protestantism · Shinto

Related ethnic groups
- Asian Latin Americans

Asian Peruvians are Peruvians of Asian descent. Most Asian Peruvians are of Chinese and Japanese descent. Around 36,000 Peruvians identify with Asian descent, constituting some 0.16% of Peru's population as per the 2017 census in Peru. In the 2017 census, only 14,223 people self-reported tusán or Chinese ancestry, while only 22,534 people self-reported nikkei or Japanese ancestry. However, according to the 2009 census, it was estimated that 5% (or 1.2 million) of the 29 million Peruvians in 2009 had Chinese roots and ancestry, while 160,000 Peruvians in 2015 had Japanese roots and ancestry.

== East and Southeast Asians ==
Asian slaves shipped from the Spanish Philippines to Acapulco (see Manila-Acapulco galleons), were all referred to as "Chino" meaning Chinese. In reality, they were of diverse origins, including Japanese, Malays, Filipinos, Vietnamese, Javanese, Timorese, and people from modern day Bangladesh, India, Sri Lanka, Makassar, Tidore, Terenate, and China. Filipinos made up most of this population. People from this diverse community of Asians in Mexico were called "los indios chinos" by the Spanish. Most of these slaves were male and were obtained from Portuguese slave traders who obtained them from Portuguese colonial possessions and outposts of the Estado da India, which included parts of India, Bengal, Malacca, Indonesia, Nagasaki in Japan, and Macau. Spain received some of these Chino slaves from Mexico, where owning a Chino slave was a sign of high status. 16th century records of three Japanese slaves, Gaspar Fernandes, Miguel and Ventura, who ended up in Mexico showed that they were purchased by Portuguese slave traders in Japan and brought to Manila from where they were shipped to Mexico by their owner Perez. Some of these Asian slaves were also brought to Lima, where it was recorded that in 1613 there was a small community of Asians made out of Chinese, Filipinos, Malays, Cambodians and others.

=== Chinese ===
Historic communities inhabited by people of Chinese descent are found throughout the Peruvian upper Amazon, including cities such as Yurimaguas, Nauta, Iquitos and the north central coast (Lambayeque and Trujillo). In contrast to the Japanese community in Peru, the Chinese appear to have intermarried much more since they came to work in the rice fields during the Viceroyalty and to replace the African slaves, during the abolition of slavery itself.

=== Japanese ===
Japanese immigrants arrived from Okinawa; but also from Gifu, Hiroshima, Kanagawa and Osaka prefectures. Many arrived as farmers or to work in the fields, but after their respective contracts were completed, settled in the cities. In the period before World War II, the Japanese community in Peru was largely run by Issei immigrants born in Japan. "Those of the second generation", (the Nisei), "were almost inevitably excluded from community decision-making."

The first Asian-Peruvian president, Alberto Fujimori, was elected in 1990, prevailing over novelist Mario Vargas Llosa.

=== Koreans ===
According to the statistics of South Korea's Ministry of Foreign Affairs and Trade, Koreans in Peru formed Latin America's seventh-largest Korean diaspora community at 1,774 people as of 2005.

== Other groups ==
=== South Asians ===
Indians in Peru form a tiny minority in the country. The first immigrants from India to arrive in Peru were businessmen who came in the early 1960s. Later on, the community grew in number marginally until the early 1980s, after which many of its members left due to the severe local economic crises and the prevailing terrorism.

=== West Asians ===
An estimated 10,000 Palestinians live in Peru. Many of these families arrived after the 1948 Arab-Israeli War.
