= Arab Peruvians =

العرب في بيرو
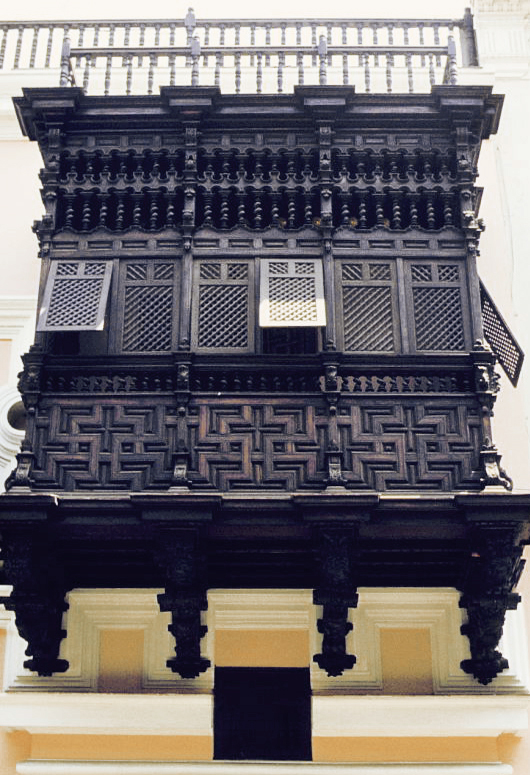
- Balcony of the Torre Tagle Palace, showing Arab influence

Total population
- 50,000 (est.)

Regions with significant populations
- Lima, Arequipa, Apurímac, Tacna

Languages
- Arabic, Spanish

Religion
- Christianity, Islam

Related ethnic groups
- Palestinians, Syrians, Lebanese

Arab Peruvians are Peruvian-born citizens who are of fully or partially of Arab descent, whose ancestors were Arabs who emigrated to Peru as part of the Arab diaspora or Arab-born people in Peru. Arab presence in Peru dates back to the Viceregal era, with later waves of immigration taking place in the context of major events, such as the dissolution of the Ottoman Empire and the Nakba.

The Arab diaspora has left its legacy in several aspects of Peruvian culture, such as in Lima's mudéjar-influenced architecture, as seen in the balconies of Lima; in food, as seen with alfajores, turrones, marzipans, alfeñiques, the mazamorra, among others; in dance, as seen with the sarabande and the zamba.

== History ==
Most Arab immigrants to Peru come from Palestine, Lebanon and Syria, as well as Turkey, Jordan, Egypt, Morocco, Iraq, Pakistan and Iran. The Palestinian community, numbered at 50,000, come from the so-called Christian triangle of Bethlehem, Beit Jala and Beit Sahour. This group settled in Lima, Arequipa and Cuzco between 1885 and 1914. At that time, the region was under the control of the Ottoman Empire.

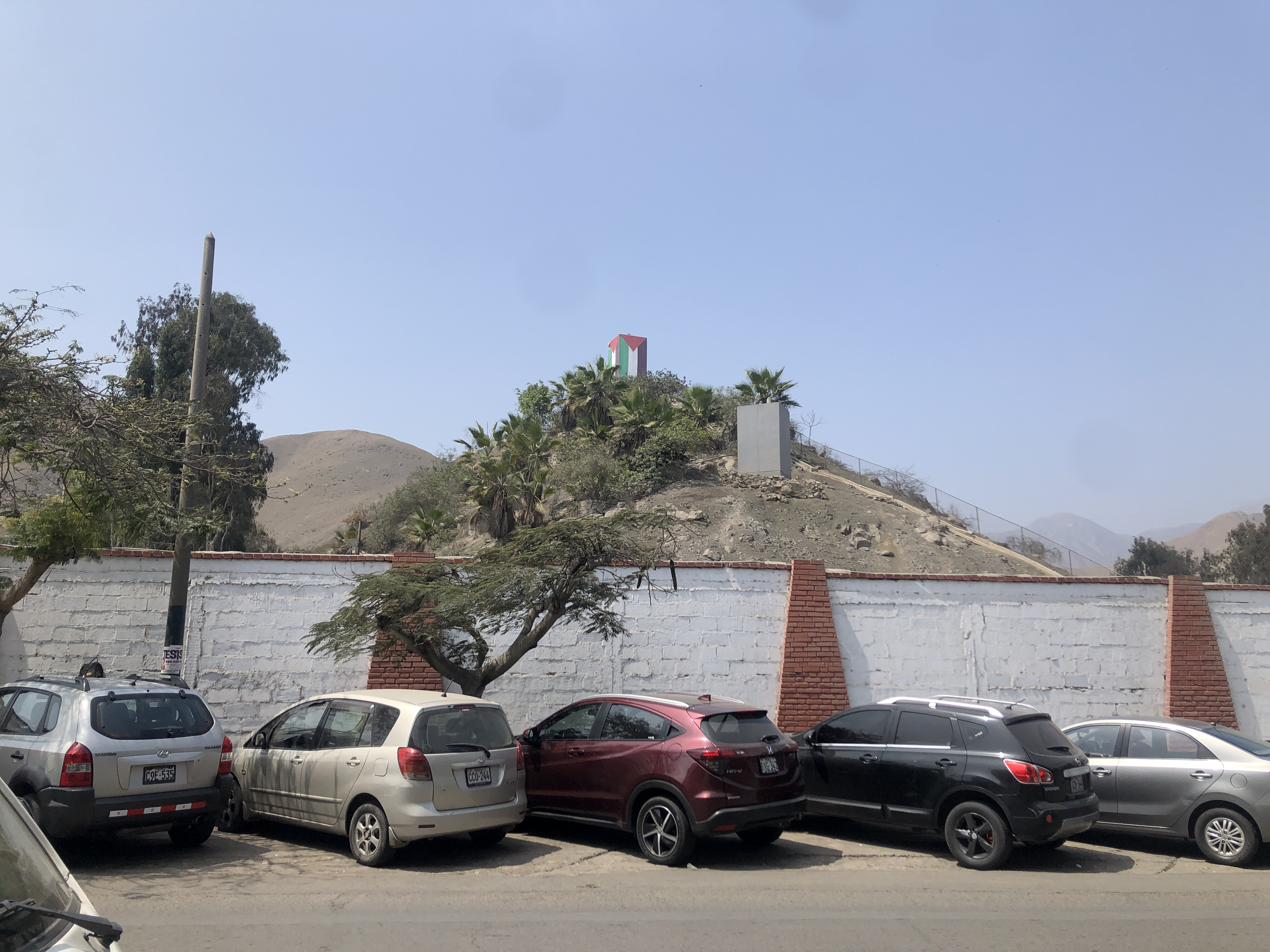
Palestinian flag decorations in Monterrico

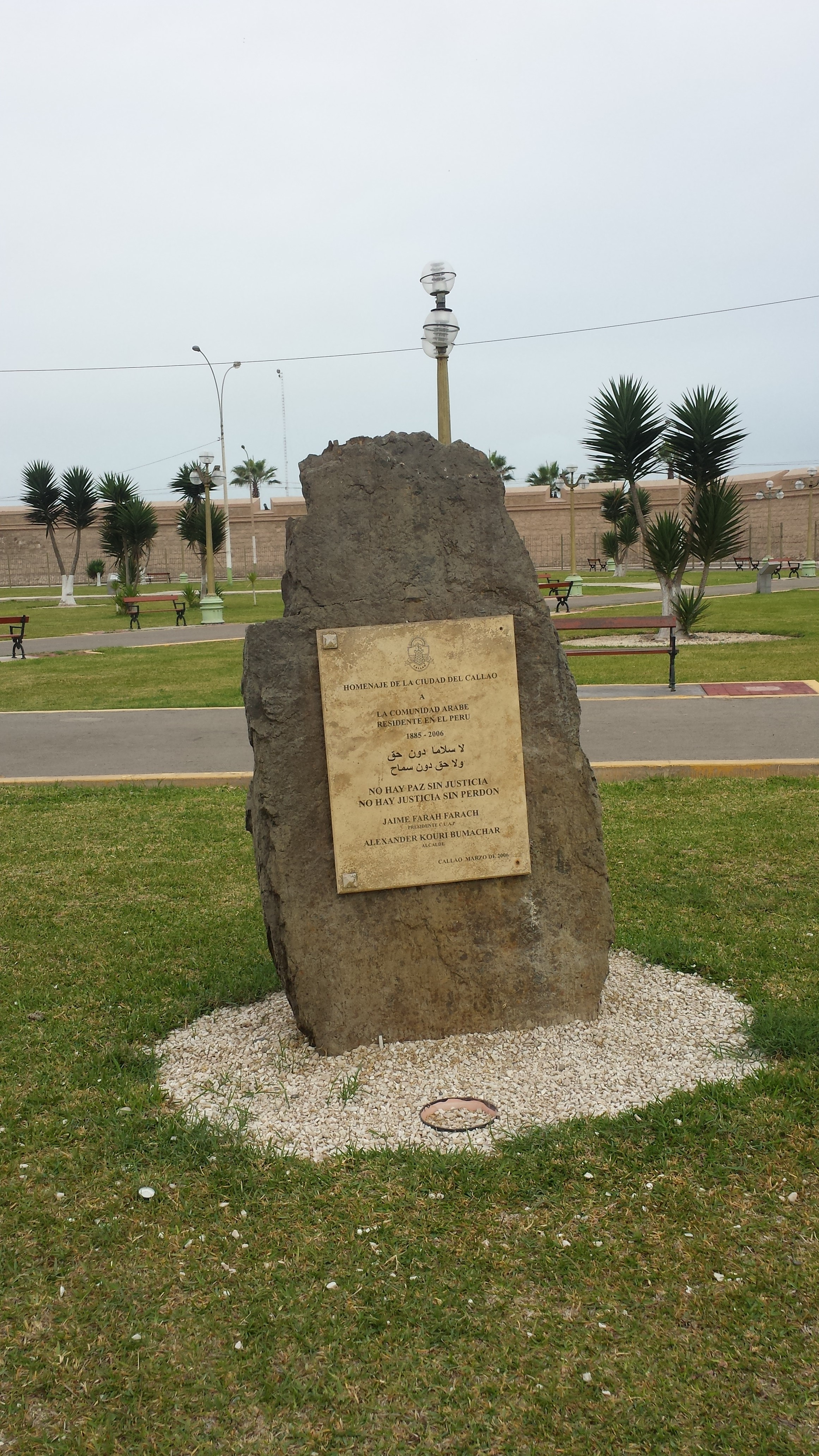
Monument in honor of the Arab community in Callao, Peru

In addition to the aforementioned cities, other immigrants settled in the southern Peruvian cities of Ica and Tacna. The former is the site of the Mosque of Lima, and the latter is the home of the Bab al-Islam Mosque, built and used mostly by Pakistani immigrants but nevertheless used by the larger Muslim community of the city. In Lima, a number of Arabs belong to the diplomatic circle, with Peru hosting a number of embassies of the Arab World, including Algeria, Egypt, Morocco, Qatar, Palestine, Saudi Arabia, Sahrawi Republic (until 2023) and the United Arab Emirates.

== Notable people ==
- Natalia Majluf, Peruvian art historian of Palestinian descent
- Daniel Abugattás, Peruvian businessman of Palestinian descent
- Amador Yarur, Chilean businessman of Palestinian descent born in Peru
- Omar Chehade, Peruvian politician of Lebanese descent
- Alexander Succar, Peruvian footballer of Lebanese descent
- Anthony Atala, Peruvian-American surgeon of Lebanese descent

== See also ==
- Islam in Peru
