= Patty Wong (model) =

Peruvian model (born 1980)

- Born: October 29, 1980 (age 45); Lima, Peru
- Occupations: Businesswoman, tv presenter, model
- Awards: Miss Perú Tusán (2001); 2nd runner-up in Mrs. Universe (2016)

Patty Wong (born October 29, 1980, in Lima, Peru) is a Peruvian model. She formerly co-hosted a popular youth-oriented Peruvian show called R con R. She also won in "Miss Perú Tusan," a beauty contest for Peruvian-Chinese girls, like her. She also co-hosts a Peruvian television show in the singing talent contest format, called Camino a la fama. She was also the host of the cancelled children's show Zoombate along with Cati Caballero as co-host, another famous Peruvian model that started her career in R con R.
