= Mosque of Lima =

Mosque in Lima, Peru

- Mezquita de Lima
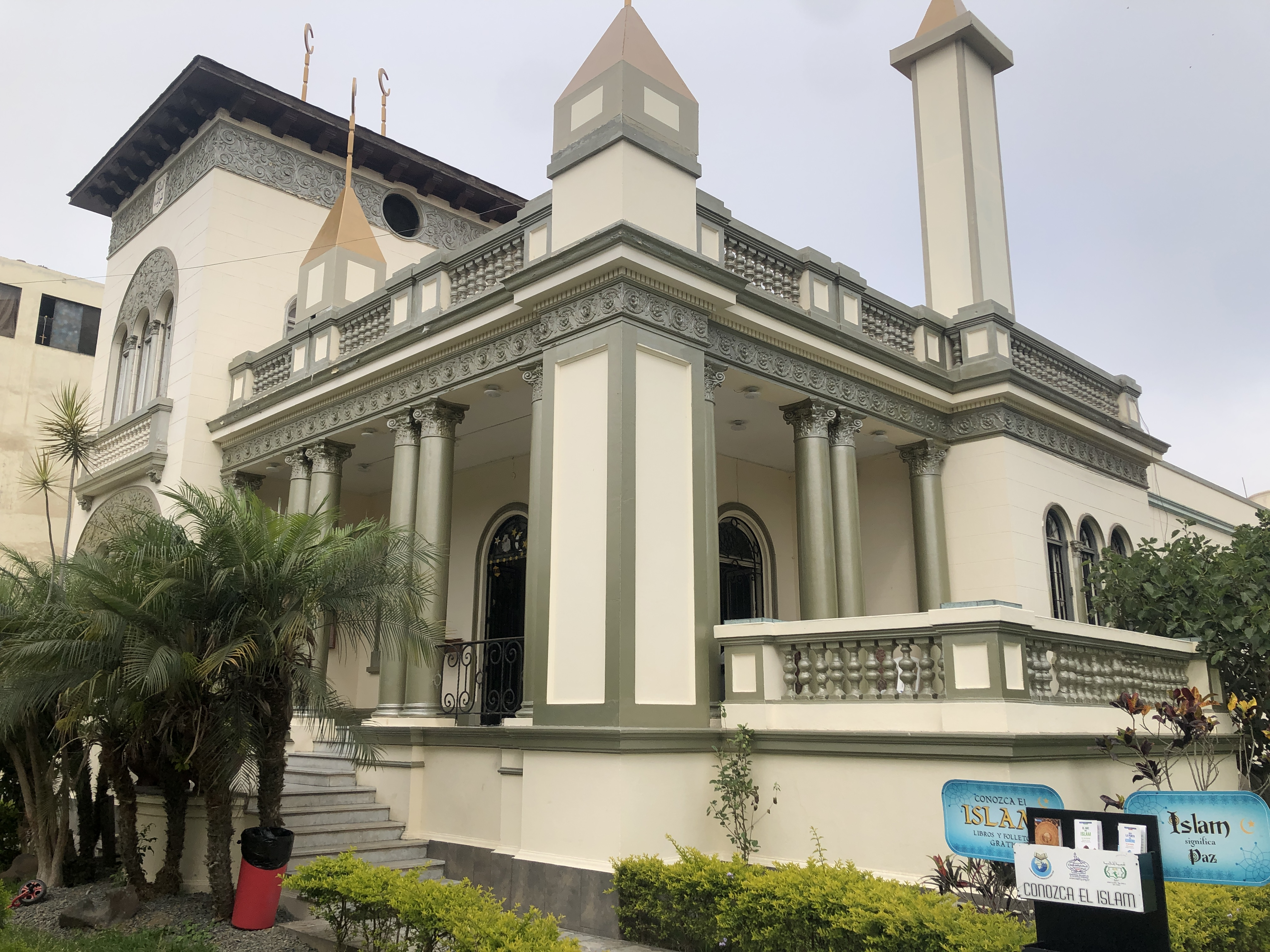

- Location of the mosque in Lima

Religion
- Affiliation: Islam
- Ecclesiastical or organizational status: Mosque
- Ownership: Islamic Association of Peru
- Status: Active

Location
- Location: Magdalena del Mar, Lima
- Country: Peru
- Interactive map of Mosque of Lima
- Coordinates: 12°05′38″S 77°04′20″W

Architecture
- Founder: Miguel Abdalá Hamideh
- Established: 1986
- Minaret: 1

The Mosque of Lima (Spanish: Mezquita de Lima), also known as the Mosque of Magdalena del Mar, is a mosque in Lima, Peru. It was erected in the areas of a mansion in 1986 by the Palestinian community in the city's Magdalena del Mar district. The mosque is open to the general public.

== History ==
In 1986 Miguel Abdalá Hamideh, a Palestinian businessman, donated his home to the Muslim community in Peru that saw its image affected by the actions of the Arab-Israeli conflict, at the same time also to provide an opening for Palestinian refugees arriving in Lima.

The Islamic Association of Peru, which took leadership of the mosque, announced between the decades of 2000 and 2010 that it planned to build a much larger mosque in the same district of Magdalena del Mar, since the number of faithful already reached two thousand, between immigrants (refugees and tourists from the Islamic world) and Peruvian converts, most of them from the Sunni branch.

The mosque is often used as a protest point by Muslims who reject any act of jihadism or Islamophobia.

On May 14, 2019, the mosque was the scene of the Interreligious Council between several religious congregations that coexist in Peru.

== Overview ==
The mosque is located at the intersection of Tacna and Alfonso Ugarte streets, a few kilometers from the Church of the Immaculate Heart of Mary.

Its façade is not exactly similar to that of an Asian mosque, so many do not use the term "masjid" to define the temple. Its interior has separate musallas for women and men, filled with carpets for prayer towards Mecca, Saudi Arabia.

It is the main place of the Muslim community in Peru, it is the celebration point for Ramadan and it is the main headquarters of the Islamic Association of Peru.

== See also ==
- Islam in Peru
- List of mosques in the Americas
- Arab Peruvians
