= Portuguese Peruvians =

Ethnic group

Luso-peruanos (Portuguese)

Total population
- 1.150 million

Regions with significant populations
- Lima

Languages
- Peruvian Spanish · Portuguese

Religion
- Christianity (Predominantly Roman Catholicism)

Related ethnic groups
- Brazilian Peruvians

Portuguese Peruvians (Portuguese: Portugueses peruanos), also known as Luso-Peruvians (Luso-peruanos), are citizens and residents of Peru who are connected to the country of Portugal by birth, ancestry, or citizenship.

== History ==
Portuguese presence in the country dates back to the Viceroyalty of Peru, a time in which Portuguese citizens constituted the majority group of Peru's foreign population. Peru shared its eastern border with Portuguese Brazil. According to historian Guillermo Lohmann Villena, 6,000 Portuguese were registered in Lima in 1640, following the Portuguese Restoration War. The persecution of New Christians by the Portuguese Inquisition, the personal union of Spain and Portugal, and Slavery laws favouring Portuguese citizens all contributed to the community's growing presence in the country, who established themselves in several locations, such as various mining regions and cities belonging to the Viceroyalty at the time, including Buenos Aires, Lima, Piura, Trujillo, Cajamarca and Arica. This took place legal restrictions aimed at non-Spaniards and non-Catholics, such as the Peruvian Inquisition and several monopolies. Most immigrants were male, and established themselves as merchants.

Following the Peruvian War of Independence, the number of Portuguese in the new country decreased. In the 1876 census, the group was numbered at 373 people nationwide.

In 2022, the Ministry of Foreign Affairs of Portugal stated that 242 Portuguese citizens were registered at the country's embassy in Lima at the time. Brazilians, a related group, represented 4.7% of immigrants in Peru between 1994 and 2012.

In total it is estimated that 14000 portuguese citizens live in Peru, with 1.15 million peruvians, 3.5% of the total country population, is estimated to have direct or indirect descent to Portugal.

== Notable people ==
- Beto da Silva, footballer
- César Calvo de Araujo, writer and painter
- César Calvo Soriano, poet, journalist, and author
- Francisco Morales Bermúdez, president of Peru from 1975 to 1980
- Julio Ramón Ribeyro, writer
- Kerwin Peixoto, footballer
- Luis de Souza, footballer
- Maricarmen Alva, politician
- Osnar Noronha, footballer
- Renzo Revoredo, footballer
- Rolando Sousa, politician
- Tania Libertad, singer

== See also ==
- Peru–Portugal relations
- Immigration to Peru
