= Indians in Peru =

Total population
- 500 (2016, est.)

Regions with significant populations
- Lima · Chimbote · Puno

Languages
- English · Spanish · Indian languages

Religion
- Hinduism · Roman Catholicism · Sikhism · Islam · Religions of India

Related ethnic groups
- Indian diaspora

Indians in Peru form a minority in the country as one of the smaller populations of the Indian diaspora. According to the Indian Ministry of External Affairs, there were about 500 Indians living in Peru as of December 2016.

== History ==
The first immigrants from India to have arrived in Peru were businessmen who had arrived in the early 1960s. Later, the community grew until the early 1980s, after which many of its members left due to severe local economic crises and prevailing terrorism. Those with relatives in other Latin American countries joined them. In recent years, the size of the community has remained stable.

There is also a small number of expatriate professionals from India in the country and a few of them have obtained Peruvian citizenship – not more than 10 out of a total number of almost forty persons.

== See also ==
- India–Peru relations
- Indian diaspora
- Immigration to Peru
- Hinduism in North America
- Asian Latin Americans
- Indians in Chile
