= White Peruvians =

Peruvians with European ancestry

Peruanos blancos (Spanish)
- White Peruvians by region

Total population
- 2,927,194 (2025 census); 9.0% of the Peruvian population (878,906 or 7.1% among self-identified population aged 12+)

Regions with significant populations
- Principally in La Libertad • Cajamarca • Piura, • Lambayeque • Oxapampa•, Tumbes Region, • Ancash • Amazonas and Lima

Languages
- Spanish (Peruvian) • Other European languages

Religion
- Predominantly Christian (Roman Catholic, followed by Protestantism and Orthodox) minorities Judaism

Related ethnic groups
- White Latin Americans • European diaspora • European people

White Peruvians (Spanish: Peruanos blancos) are Peruvians of completely or predominantly European ancestry (formerly called Criollos). In a more official sense, the census by the National Institute of Statistics and Informatics, which collects demographic data on Peruvians, uses the term "white". The 2025 census where ethnic self-identification was used, white people make up 7.1% or 878,906 of the population aged 12 years and above. Traditionally, this group had been more dominant in the political, commercial, and diplomatic sectors of Peruvian society. Using this combined census methodology, the proportion of the population classified as White Peruvians, increased to 9.0% that is 2,927,194 people. The direct and indirect census results together covered the largest share of Peru's total population, making them the classification with the broadest population coverage and the closest to the country's total census count.

The 2025 census will use the same terminology.

== History ==
European immigration to Peru began with the Spanish colonization of the Americas and continued during the Republic of Peru in the 19th century with the immigration of people from other countries of Europe (especially, Spain, Italy, Portugal, France, England and Germany, among others).

=== Spanish ===
Spanish settlement of Peru began in the early 1530s (continuing until 1821 as a viceroyalty of Spain) and continues to the present day. Spanish explorer Francisco Pizarro founded the first Spanish settlement in Peru, San Miguel de Piura in July 1532. According to historian Napoleón Cieza Burga, the conquistador Diego de Almagro founded the second Spanish settlement of Trujillo in November 1534 and one of the first modern cities in the Americas founded by the Spanish conquistadors. calling it "Villa Trujillo de Nueva Castilla" (Trujillo of New Castile) after Trujillo, the birthplace of Francisco Pizarro.

Spanish cultural influence is the most notable of all European cultural groups in Peruvian culture. Spanish heritage has left an indelible mark with signs of this cultural exchange found everywhere, from the official language, the dominant Roman Catholic religion, bullfighting, musical genres to the local culinary styles.

=== Italians ===
Among Peruvians of European descent, Italians were the second largest group of immigrants to settle in the country. Italian immigration in Peru began in the colonial era, during the Spanish Viceroyalty of Peru. However, the peak of Italian immigrants occurred after Peruvian independence, between 1840 and 1880, with the guano export boom.

=== British ===
One cultural influence is Inca Kola, a soft drink that was created in Peru in 1935 by an English immigrant Joseph Robinson Lindley. In 1911, in Rímac, one of Lima's oldest and most traditional neighborhoods, an English family began a small bottling company under their family name, Lindley. In 1928, the company was formally chartered in Peru as Corporación José R. Lindley S.A., whereupon Joseph R. Lindley became its first General Manager. Today it is still a family business with the great-grandson Johnny Lindley Suarez being the current president.

=== Danish ===
Many Danes migrated to South America, mostly to Argentina but also to Chile and Peru. Many Danes were residing in Peru during the immigrants census of 1922. One of the first Danes in the country was Jorgen Rasmussen (entered the country in 1864). His contributions to the building of the electrical system in Peru were commemorated with a plaque in the electricity museum.

== Geographical distribution ==
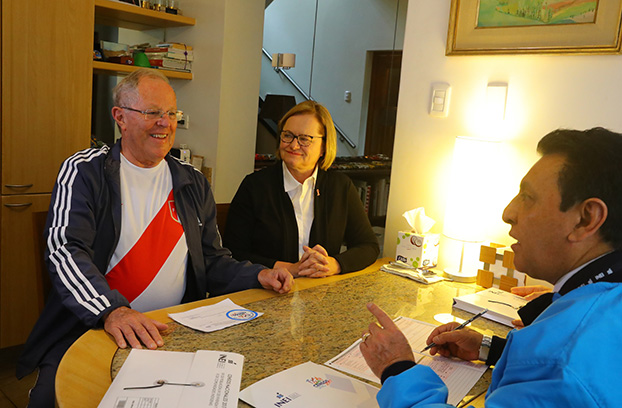
The 66th President of Peru Pedro Pablo Kuczynski, of Polish-Jewish and Swiss-French descent, responded blanco (white) for the 2017 census' question on habits and ancestors.

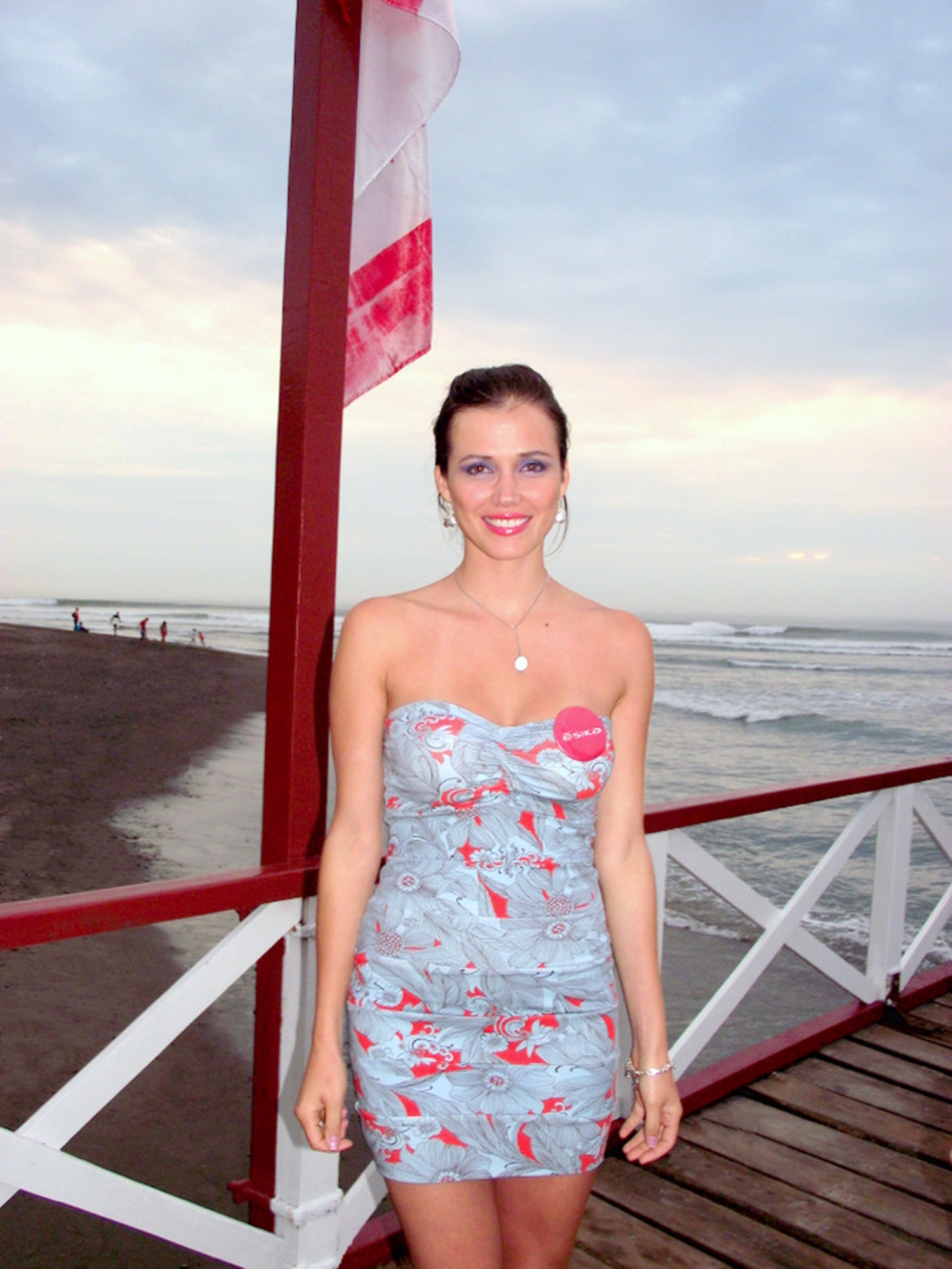
María Julia Mantilla (Miss World 2004) from La Libertad, a region with the highest proportion who self-identify as white.

According to the 2025 census 7.1% or 878,906 people 12 years of age and above self-identified as white. The regions with the highest proportion of self-identified whites were in Lambayeque Region (15.7%), Piura Region (15.4%), La Libertad Region (14.7%), Tumbes Region (14.0%), Cajamarca Region (13.9%), Amazonas Region (9.0%), Callao (7.9%), Ancash Region (7.6%), Lima Province (7.5%), and San Martín Region (7.2%). Although 7.1% of Peruvians identified as White in the direct self-identification question of the census. Using this combined census methodology, the proportion of the population classified as White increased to 9.0%. The direct and indirect census results together covered the largest share of Peru's total population, making them the classification with the broadest population coverage and the closest to the country's total census count. The regions with the highest proportion of self-identified whites were in La Libertad Region (18.3%), Tumbes Region (18,7%) , Lambayeque Region (19.4%), Piura Region (20,4%), Callao (9,4%), Cajamarca Region (16,6%), Lima Province (8,3%) and Ancash Region (10,9%)

The combined results from both the direct and indirect census classifications produced the following population distribution :

Population by region, 2025
| Region | | Population | % |
|---|---|---|---|
| | Piura | 425,888 | 20.4% |
| Lambayeque Department | Lambayeque | 264,704 | 19.4% |
| | Tumbes | 47,007 | 18.7% |
| | La Libertad | 365,345 | 18.3% |
| | Cajamarca | 237,401 | 16.6% |
| | Ancash | 126,771 | 10.9% |
| | Callao | 98,101 | 9.4% |
| | Amazonas | 40,886 | 9.0% |
| | San Martín | 82,976 | 8.7% |
| (Lima) | Lima Province | 799,799 | 8.3% |
| | Ica | 75,140 | 7.4% |
| | Lima | 82,546 | 6.0% |
| Pasco Department | Pasco | 12,219 | 5.2% |
| | Huánuco | 39,207 | 5.1% |
| (Arequipa) | Arequipa | 70,124 | 4.0% |
| Junin | Junín | 51,119 | 3.8% |
| | Moquegua | 6,354 | 3.5% |
| | Tacna | 10,030 | 2.8% |
| | Loreto | 28,779 | 2.8% |
| | Ucayali | 14,724 | 2.5% |
| | Huancavelica | 9,003 | 2.5% |
| Madre de Dios Department | Madre de Dios | 4,534 | 2.4% |
| | Ayacucho | 11,600 | 1.7% |
| | Cusco | 14,616 | 1.1% |
| | Apurímac | 3,980 | 0.9% |
| | Puno | 4,341 | 0.4% |
| (Peru) | Republic of Peru | 2,927,194 | 9.0% |

== Origins ==
The following European ethnic backgrounds form the majority of white Peruvians: Spanish, Italian, German (includes Poles due to the partitions of Poland), Portuguese, French, British, Croatian, Irish, Danish and Romanian Peruvian. Peru is also home to some 1,600 Jews, whose ancestors came (mainly) from the Russian Empire and later the USSR (modern day Latvia, Lithuania, Russia, Ukraine, and Moldova), with others coming from Germany, Poland, Hungary and Greece. Almost all of these Jews live in Lima

== Phenotypic studies ==
A study published in the journal PLOS Genetics (2022) analyzed various phenotypic characteristics in populations from five Latin American countries, including Peru. The study included a sample of 906 Peruvian individuals and assessed visible traits such as eye color, hair color, and hair texture, among others.

The phenotypic data were obtained through direct observation and categorized according to standards established for genetic association studies. The results presented are based on the specific sample of 906 Peruvian individuals evaluated in the study. The absence of certain phenotypic traits, such as blue eyes, does not imply that these traits do not exist in the country's general population; rather, it means that they were not represented in this particular sample.

These figures represent national averages and therefore do not necessarily reflect the distribution of phenotypic traits across all regions of Peru. The prevalence of lighter hair, eye, and skin pigmentation may be higher in regions with greater European ancestry in mestizos and higher proportions of people who self-identify as White, particularly in northern Peru. Consequently, the national figures should not be interpreted as representative of the phenotypic composition of every region of the country.

The results regarding eye and hair color for the Peruvian sample are summarized below:

Eye color in the Peruvian population.
| color | percentage |
|---|---|
| dark brown | 85% |
| light brown | 10% |
| hazel/honey | 3% |
| green | 2% |
| blue | 0-1% |

Hair color in the Peruvian population.
| color | percentage |
|---|---|
| black/brown | 91% |
| light brown/dark blonde | 8% |
| blonde | 1% |

Hair texture in the Peruvian population.
| hair texture | percengate |
|---|---|
| straight hair | 43% |
| wavy hair | 40,5% |
| curly hair | 11% |
| frizzy hair | 5% |

=== According to Skin tone ===
According to data from the Project on Ethnicity and Race in Latin America (PERLA), collected in 2010 through nationally representative surveys, the average skin tone in Peru was 4.6 on a scale ranging from 1 (lightest) to 11 (darkest), assessed directly by interviewers using a standardized skin-tone palette. Most of the population falls within the intermediate tones (5 and 6), which together account for approximately 49% of the total population. Light skin tones (3 and 4) account for approximately 25%, while very light tones (1 and 2) represent around 2%. In contrast, medium-dark tones (7 and 8) comprise approximately 21%, while the darkest tones (9 to 11) account for only about 3%.

This objective measurement of skin color provides a useful tool for analyzing social and racial inequalities in the country, complementing traditional categories based on ethnic and racial self-identification.

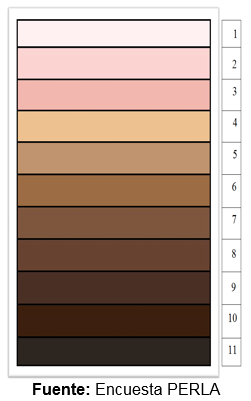
PERLA 11-point visual skin-tone scale, used in the Pigmentocracies study, ranging from tone 1 (lightest) to tone 11 (darkest).

Distribution of skin tones in Peru (assessed by the interviewer)
| skin tone | percentage |
|---|---|
| 1 | 0.5% |
| 2 | 1.4% |
| 3 | 7.7% |
| 4 | 17.3% |
| 5 | 24.1% |
| 6 | 24.8% |
| 7 | 15.2% |
| 8 | 6.2% |
| 9 | 2.1% |
| 10 | 0.5% |
| 11 | 0.1% |

== See also ==
- White Latin American
- Croatian Peruvians
- Italian Peruvians
- French Peruvians
- German Peruvians
- Polish Peruvians
- Spanish immigration to Peru
- History of the Jews in Peru
- British Peruvians
- Danish Peruvians
