= Diez de Octubre School =

First Chinese school in the Americas, located in Peru

Coordinates: 12.0662°S 77.0603°W

- 中華三民聯校
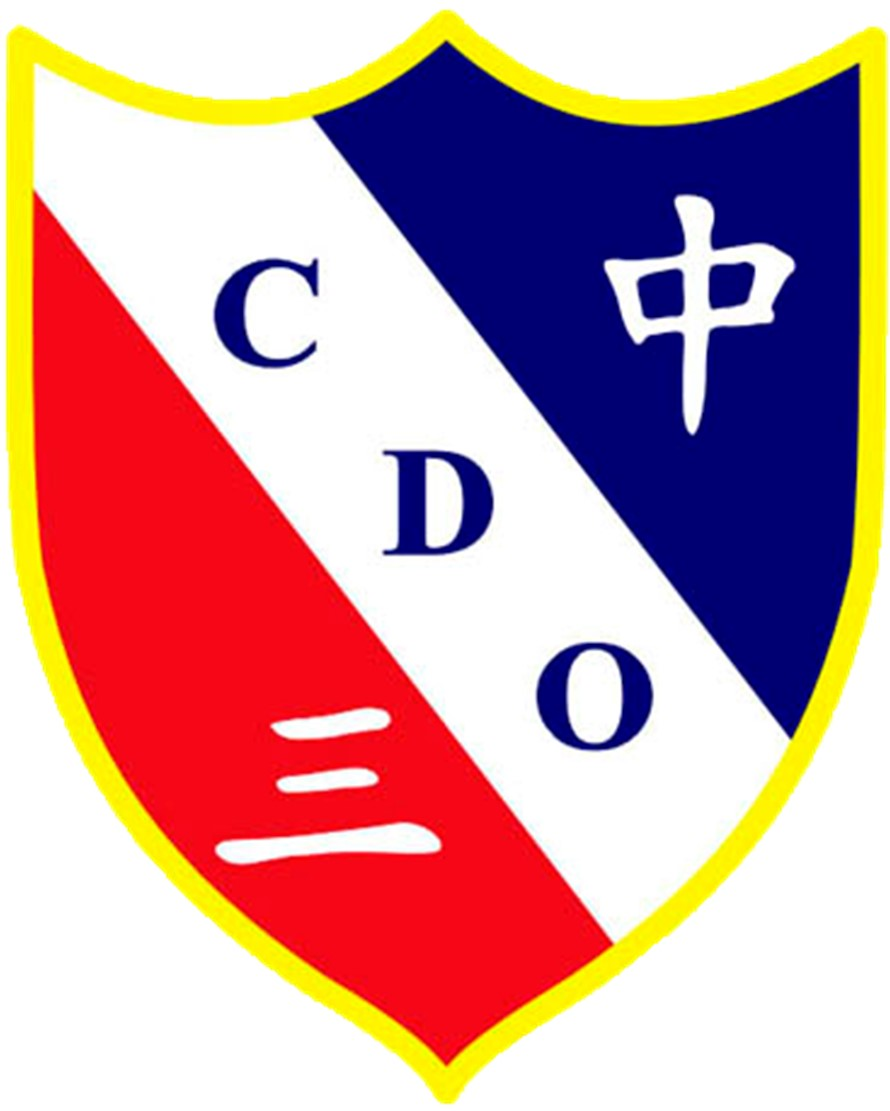

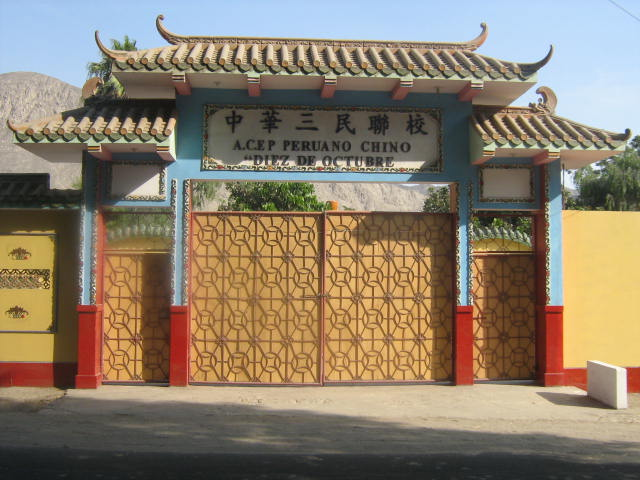
- Main gate in Cieneguilla
- See list: Breña: Av. Mariano Cornejo 1090; San Miguel: Prolongación Cusco 350; Chiclayo: Carretera Pimentel Km. 7

Information
- Motto: Hoy buenos, mañana mejores (Good today, better tomorrow)
- Religious affiliations: Secular (formerly Catholic)
- Established: 12 August 1924
- Director: See list: Breña: Martín Alvarado; San Miguel: Luis Tello; Chiclayo: Rosa Alarcón
- Language: Spanish, English and Chinese (Cantonese)
- Colour: Three colours: Turkish blue White Red
- Website: www.acepdiezdeoctubre.edu.pe

The Diez de Octubre School (Chinese: 中華三民聯校; pinyin: zhōnghuá sānmín lián xiào; lit. 'Chung Wa-San Min United Colleges'; CDO), is a Peruvian private school headquartered in Lima—in the districts of Breña and San Miguel— and Chiclayo. It was founded in 1924 by a group of women from the Catholic Ladies' Association of the Chinese Colony. The college offers early, primary and secondary education studies.

The school, originally funded by the government of the Republic of China, is the first Chinese school in the Americas.

== History ==
In 1924, a group of ladies from the Catholic Ladies' Association of the Chinese Colony, in their usual social welfare meetings, considered the urgent need to create an educational center for the benefit of the children of the Chinese residents, this being the first Chinese school in the Americas.

The "Chung Wa" school (Chinese: 中華; pinyin: Zhōnghuá), created in 1924, and the "San Min" school (Chinese: 三民; pinyin: Sānmín), created in 1936, served as the basis for the creation of the "Diez de Octubre" school in Breña in 1962. The student population was always increasing and as a result of this, the promoters created the "Confucio" annex in the San Miguel district in 1982, and the "Sun Yat Sen" school in the city of Chiclayo in 2006.

Apart from the educational centers, the school also has a Leisure and Recreation Center, located in the Cieneguilla district, which the classes attend annually. The educator Juan León Lara was the manager and conductor of these works.

The school's three representative colours represent the following:

- Blue: justice, freedom and Min Chʻüan.
- White: equality, brilliance and Min Sheng.
- Red: fraternity, sacrifice and Min Tsu.

== See also ==
- Education in Peru
- Chinese Peruvians
- China–Peru relations
