= Religion in Peru =

Religion in Peru (2017 Census) age: 12+ years
1. Catholicism (76.0%)
2. Protestantism (14.1%)
3. Other Christians (Note: 1.64% Non-denominational Christian, 1.52% Adventist, 0.75% Jehovah's Witness and 0.49% Mormon.) (4.40%)
4. No religion (5.09%)
5. Others (0.41%)

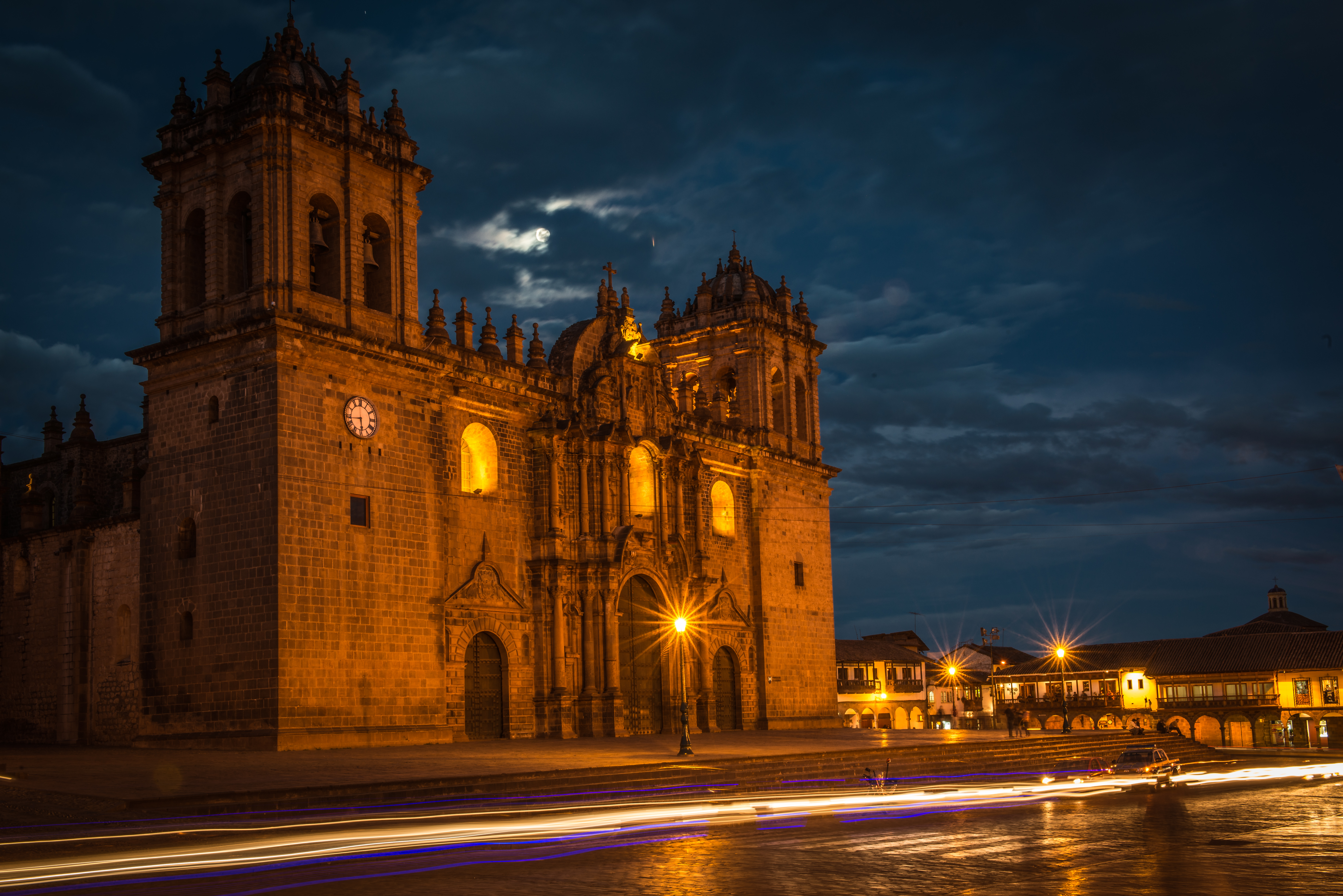
The Cathedral Basilica of the Assumption of the Virgin in Cusco is a World Heritage Site.

Christianity is the most widely professed religion in Peru, with Catholicism being its largest denomination.

Religion in Peru is traditionally related to religious syncretism originating from Catholicism with the ancient Inca religion after the Spanish Conquest. However, Protestant churches of various denominations have developed considerably in the popular sectors over the past 30 years. There has been a slow but consistent advance of irreligion especially among young people in urban areas. Religions such as Judaism and Buddhism, and more recently Hinduism and Islam, are present due to immigration.

According to article 2 of the Peruvian Constitution: "Everyone has the right to freedom of conscience and religion, individually or in association. There is no persecution for reasons of ideas or beliefs. There is no crime of opinion. The public exercise of all confessions are free, as long as they do not offend morals or disturb public order."

== Christianity ==
=== Roman Catholicism ===
==== History ====
The Spanish conquerors not only conquered Peru militarily, but also sought to convert the indigenous populations to Christianity. Indigenous Andean religious beliefs and practices persisted, which the Catholic Church sought to suppress. Many churches were built in the colonial period, the visible manifestation of Catholicism. Some convents were also built on Inca sites. For example, in 1605, some Dominican nuns built the Convent of Santa Catalina in Cuzco atop the site of the "acllahuasi", once home to virginal young women dedicated to serving the ruling Inca. Another convent, the Convent of Santa Clara, was one of the first institutions the conquistadores of Cuzco built for "Indian nobles", the daughters of the indigenous elite whose collaboration made Spain's indirect rule over the Andes possible. At Santa Clara, Inca nobles were to be "raised Christian and to receive 'buenas costumbres' (literally, good customs or manners), shorthand for an education in Spanishness", which included knowledge, stitchery, and literacy. After graduating from this course in Spanish culture, charges were free to profess vows or leave the convent. Miscegenation was not an issue among Spaniards. Many prominent Spanish men lived with elite Inca women, only to marry Spanish women later in life and marry off their Andean partners to less prominent Spaniards.

==== Modern era ====
The Peruvian government is closely allied with the Catholic Church. Article 50 of the Constitution recognizes the Catholic Church's role as "an important element in the historical, cultural, and moral development of the nation." Catholic clergy and laypersons receive state remuneration in addition to the stipends paid to them by the Church. This applies to the country's 52 bishops, as well as to some priests whose ministries are located in towns and villages along the borders. In addition each diocese receives a monthly institutional subsidy from the Government. An agreement signed with the Vatican in 1980 grants the Catholic Church special status in Peru. The Catholic Church receives preferential treatment in education, tax benefits, immigration of religious workers, and other areas, in accordance with the agreement. So, Roman Catholicism could be considered the main religion of Peru. See also the following: Roman Catholicism in Peru with Partial list of Catholic universities in Peru; and Lord of Miracles, Peruvian religious festival.

Although the Constitution states that there is freedom of religion, the law mandates that all schools, public and private, impart religious education as part of the curriculum throughout the education process (primary and secondary). Catholicism is the only religion taught in public schools. In addition, Catholic religious symbols are found in all government buildings and public places.

According to the 2017 Census, there were 76% of the population aged 12+ identifying themselves as Catholics.

=== Protestantism ===
Since the 1990s, Evangelicalism has experienced growth in Peru, with many Evangelical leaders promoting Alberto Fujimori during the 1990 Peruvian general election and were members of his political party, Cambio 90. As of the 2017 Census there were 14.1% of the population aged 12+ identifying themselves as Protestants, mainly Evangelicals. In Latin America most Protestants are called evangélicos because most of them are Evangelical Protestants, while some are also traditional Mainline Protestant. They continue to grow faster than the national growth rate.

According to 2020 statistics from Statista, the Protestant community represents 18.9% of Peru's population, including Evangelicals (17.5%) and Seventh-day Adventists (1.4%).

=== Orthodoxy ===
As of 2021, the Peruvian capital Lima was home to two Eastern Orthodox churches: one Greek and one Serbian. The Orthodox presence in Lima - which numbered roughly 350 in 2011 - is composed mostly of immigrants, but does include some Peruvian converts.

=== The Church of Jesus Christ of Latter-day Saints ===
The Church of Jesus Christ of Latter-day Saints claimed in 2022 slightly less than 620,000 members in Peru. However, the 2017 census found slightly under 114,000 people 12 or older who claimed to be members. Also, in 2022, Peru had 666 wards (large congregation) and 114 branches (small congregation) split among 112 stakes.

There are currently four LDS temples in Peru, one located in La Molina, Lima, another in Trujillo, and a third temple in Arequipa. The fourth temple, built in Los Olivos, Lima, was dedicated January 14, 2024, making Lima one of the few cities in the world with two temples.

== Other religions ==
=== Buddhism ===
Buddhism was introduced to Peru in 1899 when the ship Sakura Maru arrived at Callao, Peru, with 790 people from Japan. Japanese, Chinese, and Korean immigration to Peru during the 19th and 20th Century brought Mahayana Buddhism to Peru, and followers of that style of Buddhism remain largely concentrated within those ethnic groups. While Mahayana remains the largest school of Buddhism in Peru, other schools such as the Diamond form have begun to spread so that Peru has more than 50,000 practicing Buddhists.

=== Baháʼí Faith ===
The Baháʼí Faith in Peru begins with references to Peru in Baháʼí literature as early as 1916, with the first Baháʼís visiting as early as 1919. A functioning community wasn't founded in Peru until the 1930s with the beginning of the arrival of coordinated Baháʼí pioneers from the United States which progressed into finding national Peruvian converts and achieved an independent national community in 1961. The Association of Religion Data Archives (relying mostly on the World Christian Encyclopedia) estimated that 0.15% of the population were Baháʼí in 2020.

=== Hinduism ===
The first ‘Indian Indians’ to have arrived in Peru were businessmen who had gone there in the early 1960s. Later on, the community grew in number marginally until the early 80s, after which many of its members left due to the severe local economic crises and the prevailing terrorism. Those with relatives in other Latin countries joined them.

In the recent past, the size of the community has remained stable. There is a small remnant of the original ‘native Indians’ in this country who still maintain their traditional culture and religious beliefs.

Most members of the local Indian community are Sindhis. They are reasonably well-off, but very few can be regarded as prosperous. Their general level of education is low. Most of them speak only their mother tongue and Spanish, with a smattering of English.

There is also here a small number of professionals from other parts of India. Residence permits are not difficult to obtain in Peru. But citizenship is more complicated and only a small number of Indians have obtained it – not more than 10 out of a total of almost forty people. While a few cultural activities are organized by the more enterprising people of Indian origin, in general they maintain a low profile. Considering the vast distance that separates the community from India, its interest in its country of origin is limited to major events, mainly derived from occasional browsing on the internet. But being invariably first generation migrants, many of them do occasionally visit India.

=== Islam ===
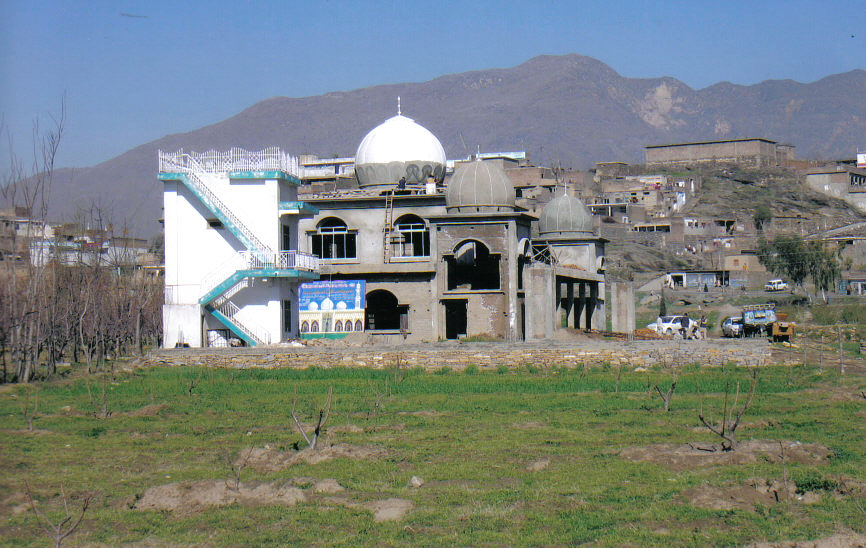
Mosque Bab ul Islam in Tacna under construction in 2007

The Islamic Association of Peru estimates a total Muslim population of approximately 2,600, (Note: Publishion date is unknown) largely based in the capital of Lima; most of them are Sunni.

=== Seax-Wica ===
Seax-Wica was introduced to Peru by Seax Gesith Ariel Phoenice, Witan of the Mimir's Well Seax Coven, Perú in 2001. Other covens were subsequently founded in Arequipa and Tacna.

== Irreligion ==
Irreligion in Peru refers to atheism, agnosticism, deism, religious skepticism, secularism, and humanism in the Peruvian society.

According to the 2017 Peruvian Census data, 1,180,361 Peruvians or 5.1% of the population older than 12 years old describes themselves as being irreligious, but some sources put this number higher at 8.2%.

The irreligious population is predominantly urban (85.5% live in cities) and males (61.4% are male), and most are young people within the ages between 18 and 29 (40.4%). Only 11.8% of irreligious people are 50 years old or older.

Even though Peru is considered to be a Secular state, according to article 50 of the Peruvian Constitution the subject of Roman Catholicism is mandatory in Peruvian public schools, although parents can request exemption for their children. Many non-profit organizations promote the removal of the subject of Roman Catholicism in public schools, such as the Secular Humanist Society of Peru.

== See also ==
- History of the Jews in Peru
