= Carmen Kuong =

Peruvian footballer (born 1981)

Personal information
- Full name: Carmen Elisa Kuong Mavila
- Date of birth: 18 March 1981 (age 45)
- Position: Centre back

International career^{‡}
Years	Team	Apps	(Gls)
2003	Peru	5	(0)
- ‡ National team caps and goals as of 27 April 2003

Carmen Elisa Kuong Mavila (born 18 March 1981) is a Peruvian former footballer who played as a centre back. She has been a member of the Peru women's national team.

== International career ==
Kuong capped for Peru at senior level during the 2003 South American Women's Football Championship.
