= Bab al-Islam Mosque =

Mosque in Tacna, Peru

Bāb al-Islām Mosque
- Mezquita Bab al-Islam
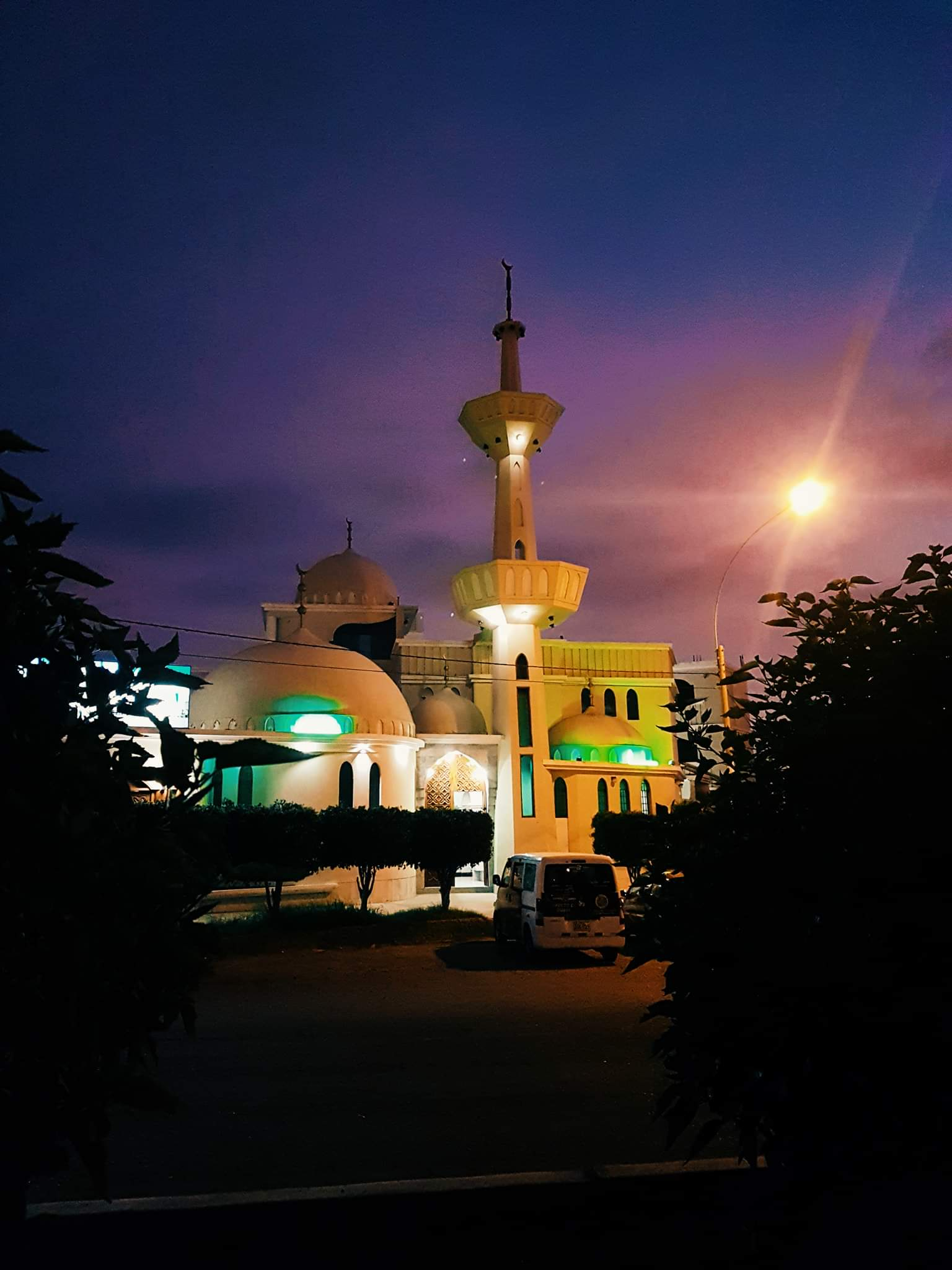
- Front entrance, 2018

- Location within Peru

Religion
- Affiliation: Sunni Islam
- Ecclesiastical or organizational status: Mosque
- Leadership: Asociación Musulmana Pakistaní
- Status: Active

Location
- Location: San Pedro de Tacna
- Country: Peru
- Interactive map of Bāb al-Islām Mosque
- Coordinates: 18°1′11.5″S 70°15′24.5″W

Architecture
- Completed: 2000

Specifications
- Dome: 2 (maybe more)
- Minaret: 1

The Bab al-Islam Mosque (Spanish: Mezquita Bab al-Islam; Urdu: مسجد باب الإسلام Masjid Bab-ul-Islam) is a mosque in Tacna, Peru. It is the only such Peruvian place of worship that is an example of Islamic architecture in the country, though it is not the only such building. It is the largest place of worship for Muslims in the entirety of the Department of Tacna. Prayers are offered in both Spanish and Arabic.

== History ==
It was built by Pakistanis who had arrived to Peru as merchants in the 1990s and were importing used cars from Japan and the United States with permission from the erstwhile Peruvian president Alberto Fujimori. The Pakistani community in Tacna grew to 95 people by 1995 and further to 500 people by the beginning of the 21st century. The complex was founded in 2000, and construction was completed by 2008. Imam Mohammad Usman was head of the Bab al-Islam Mosque in 2015.

== See also ==
- Islam in Peru
- List of mosques in the Americas
