= Loncco =

Loncco was the name given to the peasants who lived in the rural area surrounding the city of Arequipa, Peru till the end of the 20th century. The word Loncco can also involve their particular culture, dialect and way of living. Lonccos' traditions and unique way of speaking have been featured in Arequipean traditional songs, in the form of Yaravís or Pampeñas.
