= Peruvian Spanish =

Variety of Spanish language

- Español peruano
- Pronunciation: [espaˈɲol peˈɾwano]
- Native to: Peru
- Native speakers: 29 million (2018); 2,060,000 as L2 in Peru (2018)
- Language family: Indo-European: Italic; Latino-Faliscan; Latinic; Romance; Italo-Western; Western; Gallo-Iberian; Ibero-Romance; West Iberian; Castilian; Spanish; Peruvian Spanish
- Early forms: Old Latin: Vulgar Latin; Proto-Romance; Old Spanish; Early Modern Spanish
- Writing system: Latin (Spanish alphabet)

Official status
- Regulated by: Peruvian Academy of Language

Language codes
- ISO 639-1: es
- ISO 639-2: spa
- ISO 639-3: –
- Glottolog: None
- IETF: es-PE
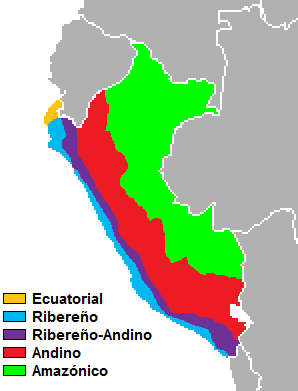
- Dialect map of Peru (in Spanish)

Peruvian Spanish (Spanish: español peruano, officially castellano) is a family of dialects of the Spanish language that have been spoken in Peru since its introduction by Spanish conquistadors in 1532. There are five varieties spoken in the country, by about 94.4% of the population. The five Peruvian dialects are Andean Spanish, Peruvian Coastal Spanish, Andean-Coastal Spanish, Equatorial Spanish, and Amazonic Spanish.

== History ==
The Spanish language first arrived in Peru in 1532. During colonial and early republican times, the Spanish spoken colloquially on the coast and in the cities of the highland possessed strong local features, but as a result of dialect leveling in favor of the standard language, the language of urban Peruvians today is more or less uniform in pronunciation throughout most of the country. Vestiges of the older dialect of the coast can be found in the speech of Afro-Peruvians, which retains Andalusian features such as the aspiration or deletion of final /s/ and the deletion of final /r/. The dialect of Arequipa, Loncco, in its pure form is now extinct, although some elders are familiar with it.

Throughout most of the highland, Quechua continued to be the language of the majority until the mid 20th century. Mass migration (rural exodus) into Lima starting in the 1940s, and into other major cities and regional capitals later on, accompanied by discrimination and the growth of mass media, have reconfigured the linguistic demography of the country in favor of Spanish. The poor urban masses originating in this migration adopted the standardized dialect spoken in the cities, however, with traces of Andean pronunciation and a simplified syntax.

== Peruvian dialects ==
=== Andean Spanish ===
Andean Spanish is the most common dialect in the Andes (more marked in rural areas) and has many similarities with the "standard" dialect of Ecuador and Bolivia.

=== Phonology ===
The Andean Spanish is distinguished by its slow time and unique rhythm (grave accent), assibilation of /r/ and /ɾ/, and an apparent confusion of the vowels /e/ with /i/ and /o/ with /u/. (In reality, they are producing a sound between /e/ and /i/, and between /o/ and /u/.) Furthermore, the "s" (originally apical and without aspiration) is produced with more force than that of the coast; this is also generally true of the other consonants, at the loss of the vowels. Other distinctive features are the preservation of /ʎ/, sometimes hypercorrective realization of /ʝ/ as [ʎ], and the realization of velar plosives as a fricative [x]. Also, the intonation patterns of some Andean accents, such as that of Cusco, is influenced by Quechua intonation.

=== Morphosyntactic characteristics ===
The morphosyntactic characteristics are typical:

- Confusion or unification of gender and number

A ellas lo recibí bien. - La revista es caro.

- Confusion or unification of gender and number

esa es su trenza del carlos.

- Frequent use of the diminutives –ito and –ita

Vente aquicito. - Sí, señorita, ahí están sus hijos.

- Loísmo

Lo echan la agua. Lo pintan la casa

- Duplication of the possessives and objects

Su casa de Pepe. Lo conozco a ella.

- The absence or redundant use of articles.

Plaza de Armas es acá. La María está loca.

- Uncommon use of the preposition "en" in front of locative adverbs

Todo caerá en su encima.

- The use of "no más" and "pues" after the verb

Dile nomás pues.

- The use of the verb at the end of the phrase

Está enojada dice.

- The use of the simple tense to express the preterite and of the indicative in place of the subjunctive in subordinates.

=== Peruvian Coastal Spanish ===
Coastal Spanish (ribereño or costeño) is spoken throughout the coast. It has the reputation (in pronunciation) of being one of the "purest" dialects in all of coastal Latin America because it does not debuccalize /s/ between vowels and retains the fricatives [x] and [χ]. It is the characteristic dialect as perceived abroad and has the reputation of being the base of "normal" or standard Peruvian Spanish.

==== Phonology of Peruvian Coastal Spanish ====
- The vowels are the same than A, E, I, O and U. Sometimes, other vowels can appear.
- /r/ and /ɾ/ are pronounced clearly, without any fricativization.
- /s/ is more often laminal than apical, and debuccalized to [h] in front of most consonants (though it is [x] before /k/). It is retained as [s] in final position (as opposed to in Chile or Andalusia).
- /x/ varies between [x], [χ], and [ç] (preceded by [e] and [i]); it is sometimes [h].
- Word-final nasals are velar (not alveolar like in Mexico or central Spain).
- The final /d/ is normally elided, but sometimes devoiced as [t] in formal speech.
- Yeísmo exists, the phoneme occurring as [ʝ], with some speakers using an affricate [ɟʝ] in the word-initial position.
- The tendency to eliminate hiatus in words with an -ear suffix.

General Spanish phrases from the Americas are common but there are also phrases that originate in the Lima coastal area, such as frequent traditional terms and expressions; the most ingrained "quechuaism" in common speech is the familiar calato, meaning "naked".

=== Andean-Coastal Spanish ===
Andean-Coastal Spanish (ribereño-andino) originated in the last 30 to 50 years with a mixture of the speech of Andean migrants and the speech of Lima. This dialect is the speech that is most typical in the outskirts of the city, but also serves as a transitional dialect between Coastal and Andean Spanish spoken in between the coast and the highlands.

Phonology of Andean-Coastal Spanish
Characteristics	Example	Coastal/Lima Spanish	Coastal-Andean Spanish
No assibilation of /r/ and /ɾ/ except in the older generations, but the articulation of these two sounds is weakened, and the final syllable is silent in internal contexts.
Closed and lax emission of vowels in general.			
Confusion between /e/ and /i/ as well as /o/ and /u/ in casual speech.			
Weakening, sometimes to the point of elimination, of the consonant sounds /b/, /d/, /ɡ/ and /ʝ/ when in intervocalic contexts.	aguanta	[aˈɣwaŋta]	[aˈwaŋta]
Weakening, sometimes to the point of elimination, of the consonant sounds /b/, /d/, /ɡ/ and /ʝ/ when in intervocalic contexts.	dado	[ˈdaðo]	[ˈdao]
Weakening, sometimes to the point of elimination, of the consonant sounds /b/, /d/, /ɡ/ and /ʝ/ when in intervocalic contexts.	mantequilla	[maŋteˈkiʝa]	[maŋteˈki.a]
Weakening, sometimes to the point of elimination, of the consonant sounds /b/, /d/, /ɡ/ and /ʝ/ when in intervocalic contexts.	baboso	[baˈβoso]	[βaˈoso]
Strong pronunciation of "s", or with a weak whistling; less aspiration before consonants (articulated more like /x/ in front of /k/)	asco	[ahˈko]	[axˈko]
Voicing of voiceless consonants.	pasajes	[paˈsaxes]	[paˈsaɣes]
Voicing of voiceless consonants.	fósforo	[ˈfosfoɾo]	[ˈfosβoɾo]
Voicing of voiceless consonants.	época	[ˈepoka]	[ˈeβoka]
Accelerated speech and with varied intonation based on Andean Spanish.			

This dialect has the usual Andean syntactics, like lack of agreement in gender and number, the frequent use of diminutives or augmentatives, loísmo, double possessives and ending phrases with "pues", "pe" or "pue".

As far as the lexicon is concerned, there are numerous neologisms, influences from Quechua, and slang among the youth often heard in the streets.

=== Amazonic Spanish ===
This dialect has developed uniquely, with contact from Andean Spanish and the Spanish of Lima with the Amazonian languages. It has a distinctive tonal structure.

Phonetically it is characterized by:

- The sibilant /s/ resisting aspiration
- A confusion of /x/ with /f/ (always bilabial)

For example, San Juan becomes San Fan

- There is occlusion of the intervals /b, d, g/ in tonal ascension with aspiration and lengthening of the vowels.
- /p, t, k/ are pronounced with aspiration
- The /ʝ/ tends to become an affricate (as opposed to Peruvian Coastal Spanish)
- Also, there is assibilation and weak trills.

On the other hand, the syntactic order most recognized is the prefixation of the genitive:

De Antonio sus amigas

There are also disorders of agreement, gender, etc.
