= Huaycán =

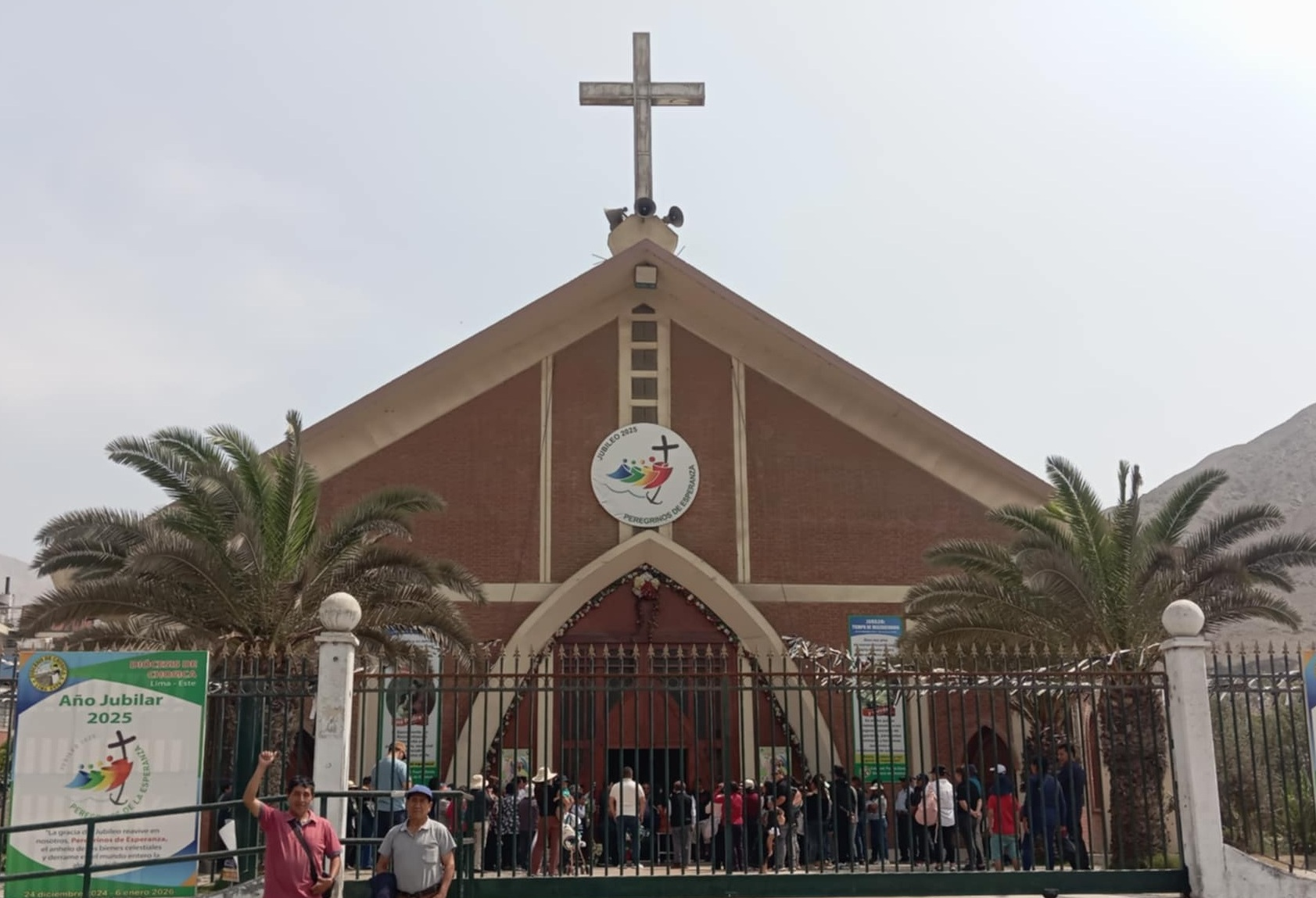
- Huaycan Cathedral by Roman Catholic Diocese of Chosica

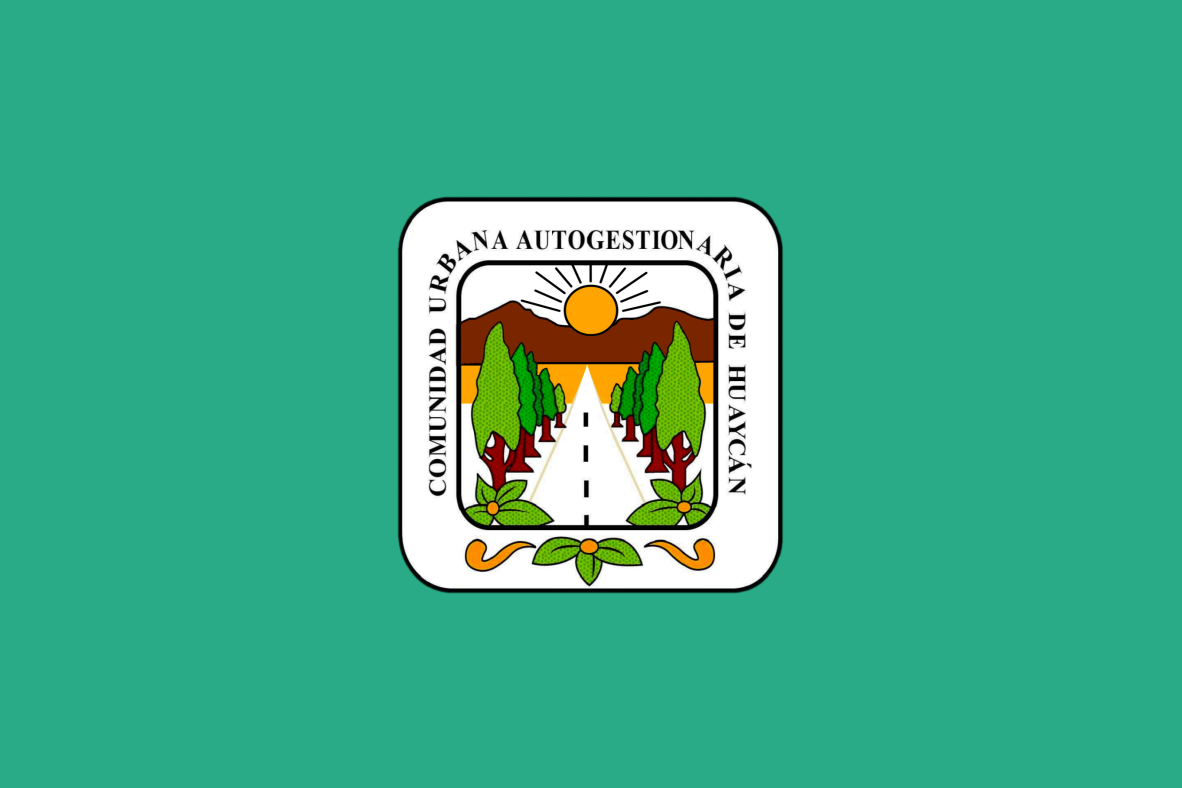
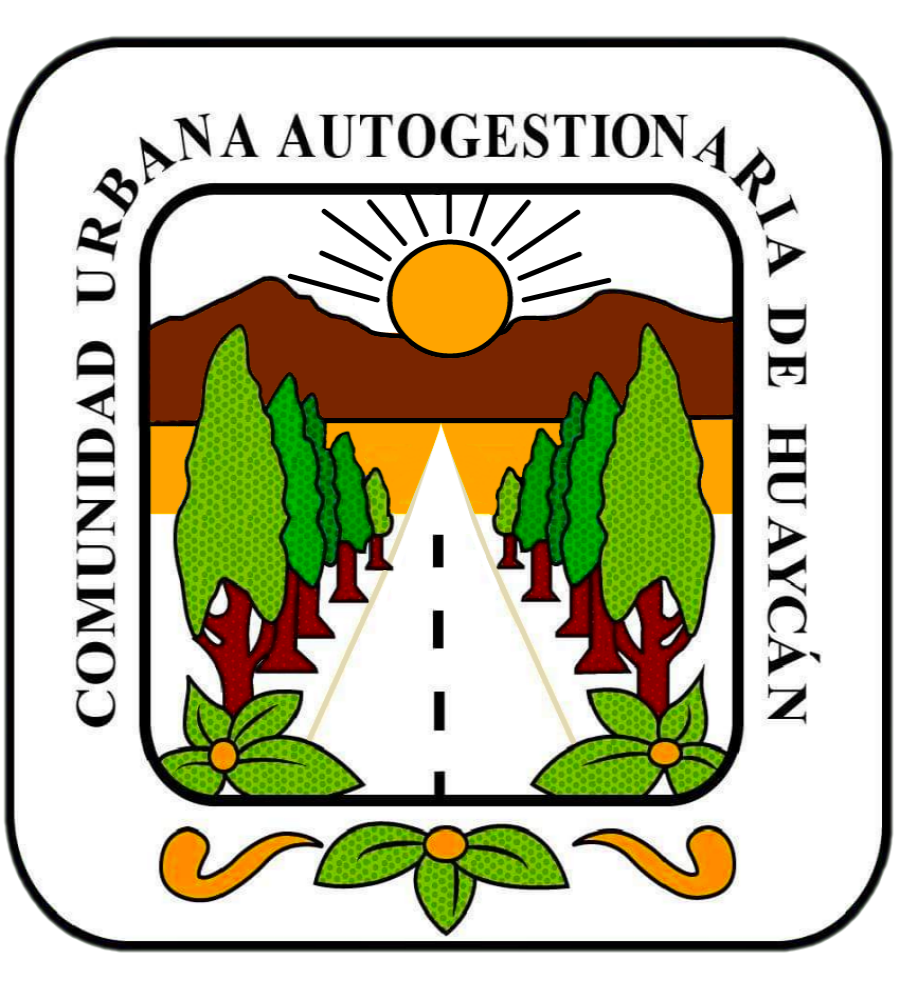
- Flag Seal

- Location in Peru
- Coordinates: 12°1′5″S 76°48′50″W
- Country: Peru
- Region: Lima Region
- Province: Lima Province
- District: Ate District
- Founded: July 15, 1984

Population
  - Total: 160 000
- Time zone: UTC-5 (PET)

The urban community of Huaycán (officially named Comunidad Urbana Autogestionaria de Huaycán) is a town of Lima, Peru, located in Ate District, approximately 16.5 kilometres east of Lima. It is home to thousands of immigrant settlers from different parts of Peru, looking to improve their standard of living and job opportunities in the city of Lima.

Huaycán is also a notable archaeological site. It has a population of over 160,000 inhabitants.

== History ==
The emergence of the Huaycán Special Project in 1984 was part of the Urban Development Plan of the Municipal Government of Izquierda Unida (IU) prepared under the management of the Mayor of Ate Vitarte, Franklin Acosta del Pozo. Ate was considered in the program of the three Cones of Metropolitan Lima, for families without housing and with scarce economic resources. In the Southern Cone, the pampas of Manchay; the Northern Cone, the Chillón River Slopes and San Juan de Lurigancho; and the Eastern Cone, the Quebradas de Huaycán, which were still under the custody of the Pope Family, considered as alleged owners.

The procedures for the adjudication of land in the Quebrada de Huaycán began before 1983, by members of 18 housing groups, mostly workers from the powers of the State, during the administration of the mayor of Metropolitan Lima, Eduardo Orrego Villacorta, of the Popular Action party. Carrying out previously the pertinent studies and the topographic survey of the Huaycán Special Project.

In September 1983, a group of families came together in the Andrés Avelino Cáceres de Ate Vitarte human settlement. In March 1984, the Pro-Huaycán José Carlos Mariátegui Human Settlement of El Agustino was founded, which brought together some 500 members.

The human settlements in the districts of Chaclacayo, Ate Vitarte and El Agustino, mostly promoted by leaders of the United Left party (IU), requested in early 1984 the adjudication of the land in the Huaycán ravine. This request was met by the then Provincial Mayor of Lima Alfonso Barrantes, who promoted the emergence of the Huaycán Special Project, which made up the Urban Development Plan in the three cones of Metropolitan Lima, as an alternative for families with limited economic resources that they did not own a home. Enabling this project in the Southern Cone the Pampas de Manchay, in the Northern Cone the Slopes of the Chillón River in San Juan de Lurigancho, and in the Eastern Cone the Quebrada de Huaycán.

On July 13, 1984, the last coordination meeting was held, with the presence of Mayor Barrantes. The location of each of the groups was agreed upon by signing an act, also committing to respect the boundaries of the National Institute of Culture (INC). The housing associations and cooperatives, being the first managers, were assigned the lower part of Huaycán, which today corresponds to zone A, while the human settlements would be located in the higher parts.

On July 15, these groups seized the lands in an organized and peaceful manner. The most organized main organization began to arrive first, such as the Andrés A. Cáceres Homeless Residents Association with 3,600 families, then the other two organizations such as the José Carlos Mariátegui human settlement in El Agustino, with more than a thousand families. Later they arrived in a third group formed by two thousand members the A.H. Jose Carlos Mariategui from Vitarte carrying construction materials. Lastly, the Las Malvinas de Ñaña housing association arrived. In order to group all the member organizations into one, it is proposed to create the "Management Committee of the Special Program for Urban Habilitation of the Huaycán Area", remaining as the only entity of direction and decision within the project. His presidency fell to Eduardo Figari.

== Huaycán District ==
At the end of January 2017, the Permanent Commission of the Peruvian Congress approved the opinion that declares the creation of thé district of Huaycán of national interest. The project was approved in the first vote and is the beginning of the legal procedure for the creation of the new district of Huaycán. The author of the proposal was Fujimorist congresswoman Úrsula Letona. The new municipal jurisdiction would have 27.40 km^{2} of surface área and a population of about 160,000 inhabitants, 25% of the population of Ate.

On March 3, 2017, the Congress of the Republic, under the presidency of Congresswoman Luz Salgado, promulgated LAW N° 305445 that declares the creation of the District of Huaycán of national interest and public necessity.

== Sites of interest ==
- Monumental Archaeological Zone Huaycán de Pariachi, pre-Hispanic archaeological center, keeps samples and riches of the building expressiveness of the ancient Peruvians. Its entrance is located in one of the curves of Los Incas Avenue that borders El Descanso neighborhood since 1972. On October 10, 2000, it was declared Cultural Heritage of the Nation, which reinforces the intangibility of the areas, its true name is the Huaycán de Pariachi Archaeological Monumental Complex.
- San Andrés de Huaycán Cathedral, founded in the nineties, is located in the current Civic Center of Huaycán, it is the highest representation of Catholicism in the Eastern Cone and the titular seat of the bishop of the Diocese of Chosica.
- Hospital de Huaycán, first it was a health post that was created in September 1984, then on July 31, 2003, by Ministerial Resolution No. 0868-2003-SA / DM the Health Center was elevated to the category of Low Complexity Hospital I.
- Parque Industrial de Huaycán, founded in 1998, is located on the left side of the creek coming from the Central Highway through Andrés Avelino Cáceres avenue, concentrates the productive development of five large economic sectors, metal-mechanics, wood, textiles, footwear and crafts.

== Presidents and General Secretaries ==
- Comité de Gestión 1984-1985
- Raúl Rodríguez 1985–1986 APAHH
- Walter Ortega Yllanes 1986–1988 APAHH
- Juan Lara Casabona 1988 CUAH
- José Vilches Chacón 1988-1990
- Luis López Fernández (Transitorio)
- Pascuala Rosado 1991-1993
- Richard Ortiz Parraguez 1993
- Jaime Pérez Cabanillas 1993-1995
- Godofredo Pulcha 1995-1997
- Jaime Lastra Domínguez 1998
- Pedro Huayta Huamaní 1998-2000
- Carlos Castro Ramos 2000-2002
- Vicente Arce Céspedes 2003-2005
- Vicente Arce Céspedes 2005-2007
- Rudy Aliaga Castañeda 2008-2010
- Rudy Aliaga Castañeda 2010-2012
- Federico Godiño Quincho 2012-2014
- Eufrasia Laura Eulogio 2014-2017

== Gallery ==
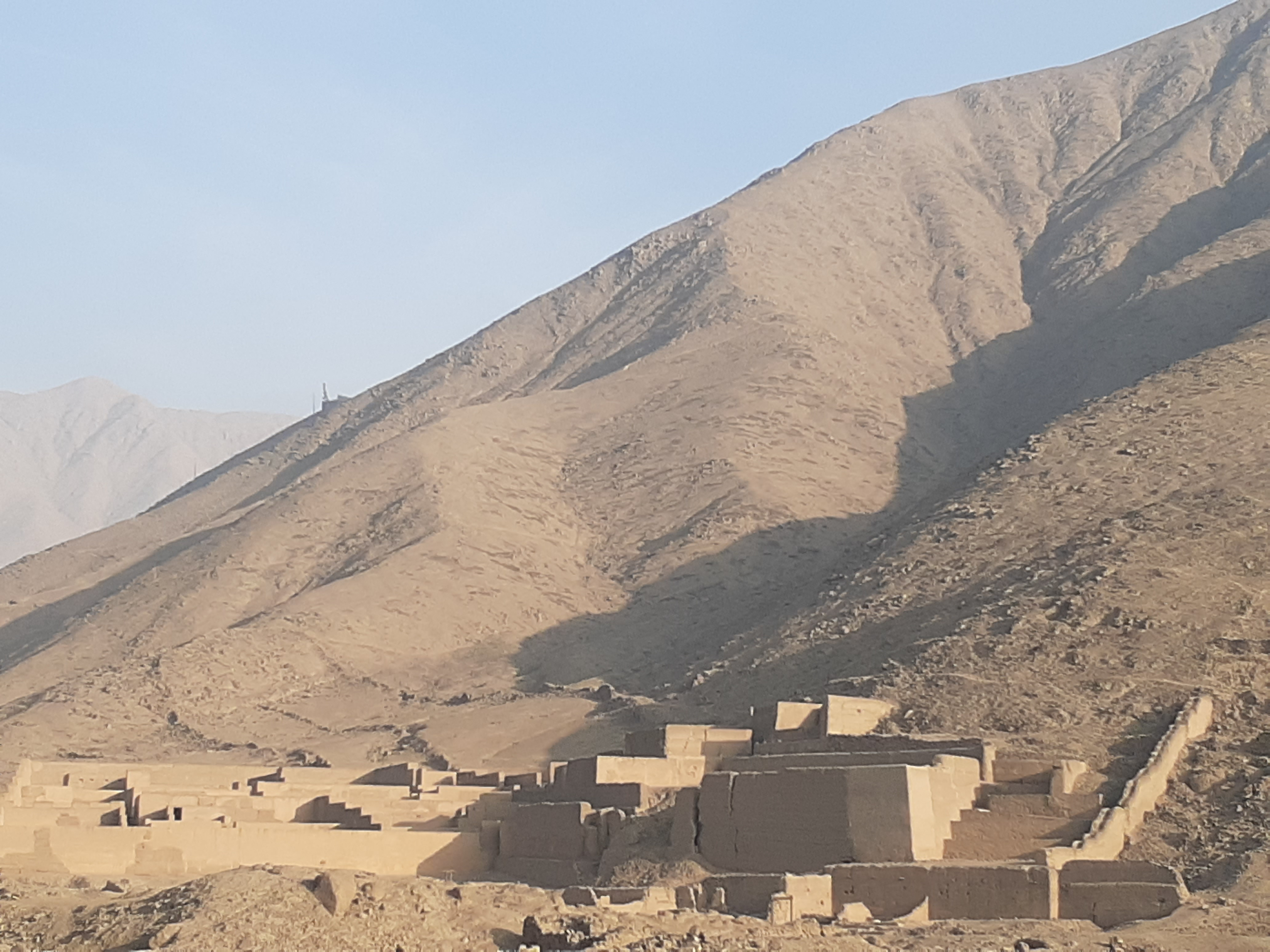
Huaycán de Pariachi archaeological site

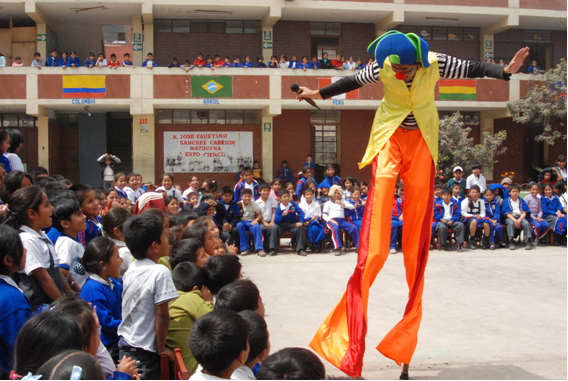
Campaign in the schools of Huaycán

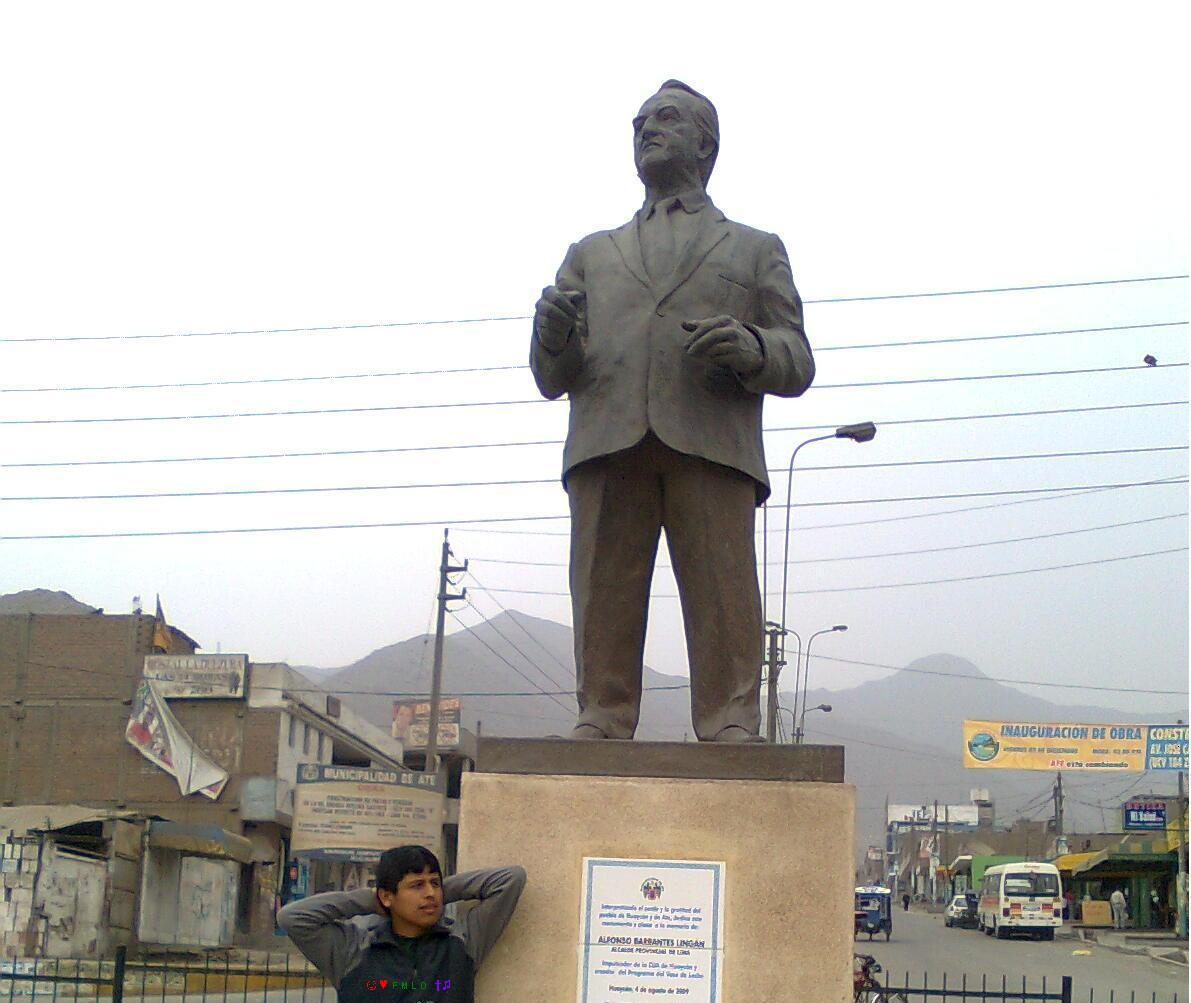
Monument to ex-mayor Alfonso Barrantes
