= Ate District =

District in Lima, Peru

Ate
- District
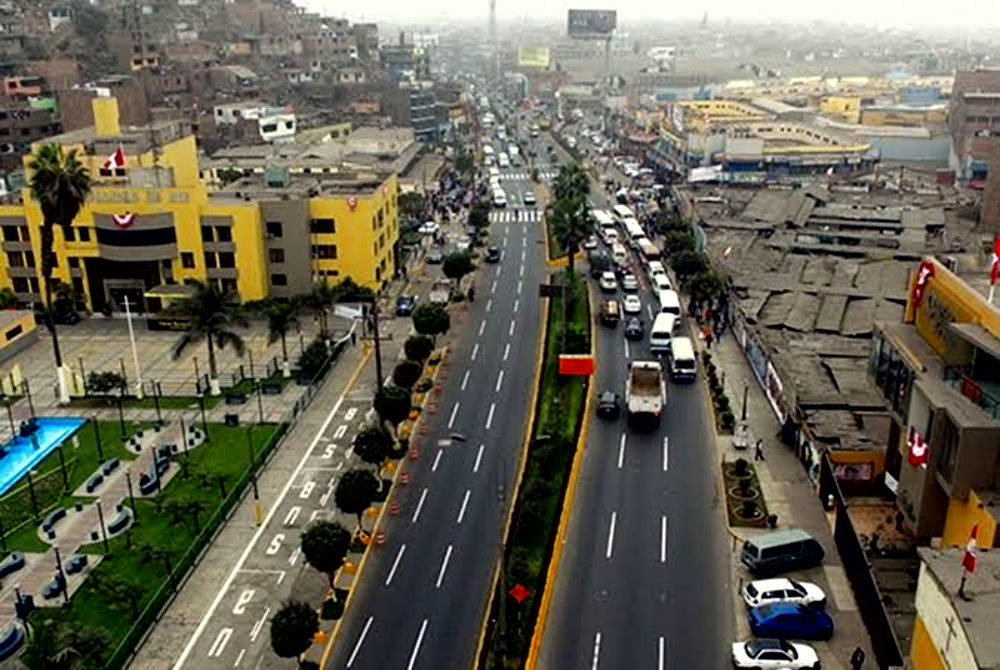

- Flag Coat of arms

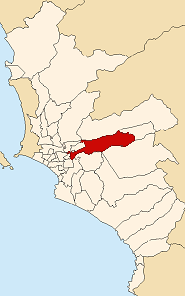
- Location of Ate in Lima
- Coordinates: 12°00′37″S 76°52′12″W
- Country: Peru
- Province: Lima
- Capital: Vitarte

Government
  - Mayor: Franco Vidal Morales (2023-2026)

Area
  - Total: 77.72 km^{2} (30.01 sq mi)
- Elevation: 355 m (1,165 ft)

Population (2023)
  - Total: 713,103
  - Density: 9,175/km^{2} (23,760/sq mi)
- Time zone: UTC-5 (PET)
- UBIGEO: 150103
- Website: muniate.gob.pe

Ate, also known as Ate-Vitarte, is one of the forty-three districts that make up Lima Province, located in Peru. The district was founded in 1821, with the city of Ate being the capital until 1951, when it was changed to Vitarte.

== History ==
The Ate name is of Aymaran origin and denoted a local Native town, while the Vitarte name is a Castilian Spanish derivation of the Basque family name Ubitarte, which were the original Spanish landowners in the surrounding area.

The district of Ate was founded by express law on August 4, 1821, by General Don José de San Martín, a few days after Peru's declaration of independence. This law created the province of Lima and the districts into which it would be divided: Ancón, Ate, Carabayllo, Chorrillos, Lurigancho and Lima.

It gained importance during the government of Marshal Ramón Castilla, who granted his lands, between 1855 and 1862, to the citizen Don Carlos López Aldana to protect the development of national industry.

Carlos López Aldana founded the Vitarte Textile Factory in 1872 (later CUVISA), which led to the construction of houses for the workers and their families, who, upon settling down, formed the town of Vitarte. Meanwhile, new industries were being installed in the area, making it the main industrial center of Lima for the following decades.

On February 13, 1951, with Law No. 11951, the district capital passed from the town of Ate to the town of Vitarte, which gave rise to the district being called "Ate Vitarte". Likewise, in the twentieth century a continuous dismemberment of what was the original territory of Ate began for the creation of other districts such as Chaclacayo in 1926, La Victoria (1920), Santiago de Surco (1944) with which it loses its exit Sea, and in the 70s, Surco loses the sea border with the foundation of San Juan de Miraflores and Villa El Salvador; El Agustino (1960). San Luis (1960), La Molina (1962) and Santa Anita (1989).

Since the 1980s, Vitarte has become one of the main receiving centers of provincial migration that, at this point, had already taken over the traditional center of Lima. This resulted in the urbanization of Ate and its integration into the Urban Agglomerate, causing the loss of the agricultural territory that it had initially, being a riverside district of the Rímac River. With commercial sectors where informal commerce abounds, such as Ceres, Villa Vitarte, Santa Clara, Huaycán and Valdiviezo. As well, as consolidated residential areas such as the Mayorazgo and Salamanca de Monterrico urbanizations. These with better public management are located on the border with districts such as La Molina, Santiago de Surco and San Borja.

== Geography ==
The district has a total land area of 77.72 km^{2}. Its administrative center is located 355 meters above sea level.

=== Boundaries ===
- North: Lurigancho-Chosica
- East: Chaclacayo
- South: Cieneguilla, Pachacámac, La Molina and Santiago de Surco.
- West: San Borja, San Luis, El Agustino and Santa Anita.

== Demographics ==
According to the 2007 census by the INEI, the district has 478,278 inhabitants and a population density of 6,154 persons/km^{2}. In 2005, there were 105,190 households in the district. It is the 13th most populated district in Lima.

== Points of interest ==
- Stadium "Estadio Monumental de Universitario de Deportes", home of one of the most popular football teams in Perú.
- Puruchuco Archeological Site
- Huaycán de Pariachi Archeological Site
- Cahuide Park

== Climate ==
Climate data for Ate District (Santa Clara), elevation 415 m (1,362 ft)
Month	Jan	Feb	Mar	Apr	May	Jun	Jul	Aug	Sep	Oct	Nov	Dec	Year
Mean daily maximum °C (°F)	27.4 (81.3)	29.1 (84.4)	28.8 (83.8)	27.3 (81.1)	21.7 (71.1)	19.3 (66.7)	18.6 (65.5)	18.7 (65.7)	18.5 (65.3)	21.9 (71.4)	23.2 (73.8)	25.2 (77.4)	23.3 (74.0)
Daily mean °C (°F)	22.4 (72.3)	23.5 (74.3)	23.5 (74.3)	21.7 (71.1)	16.9 (62.4)	15.5 (59.9)	15.2 (59.4)	15.4 (59.7)	15.5 (59.9)	17.6 (63.7)	19.0 (66.2)	20.1 (68.2)	18.9 (66.0)
Mean daily minimum °C (°F)	17.5 (63.5)	18.0 (64.4)	18.2 (64.8)	16.1 (61.0)	12.2 (54.0)	11.7 (53.1)	11.7 (53.1)	12.1 (53.8)	12.4 (54.3)	13.3 (55.9)	14.8 (58.6)	14.9 (58.8)	14.4 (57.9)
Average precipitation mm (inches)	0.0 (0.0)	0.2 (0.01)	0.0 (0.0)	0.0 (0.0)	0.0 (0.0)	1.8 (0.07)	0.0 (0.0)	0.0 (0.0)	0.0 (0.0)	0.0 (0.0)	0.0 (0.0)	0.2 (0.01)	2.2 (0.09)
Source: Plataforma del Estado Peruano

== See also ==
- Administrative divisions of Peru
