= Santa Rosa District, Lima =

District in Lima, Peru

Coordinates: 11°48′23″S 77°09′56″W

Santa Rosa
- District
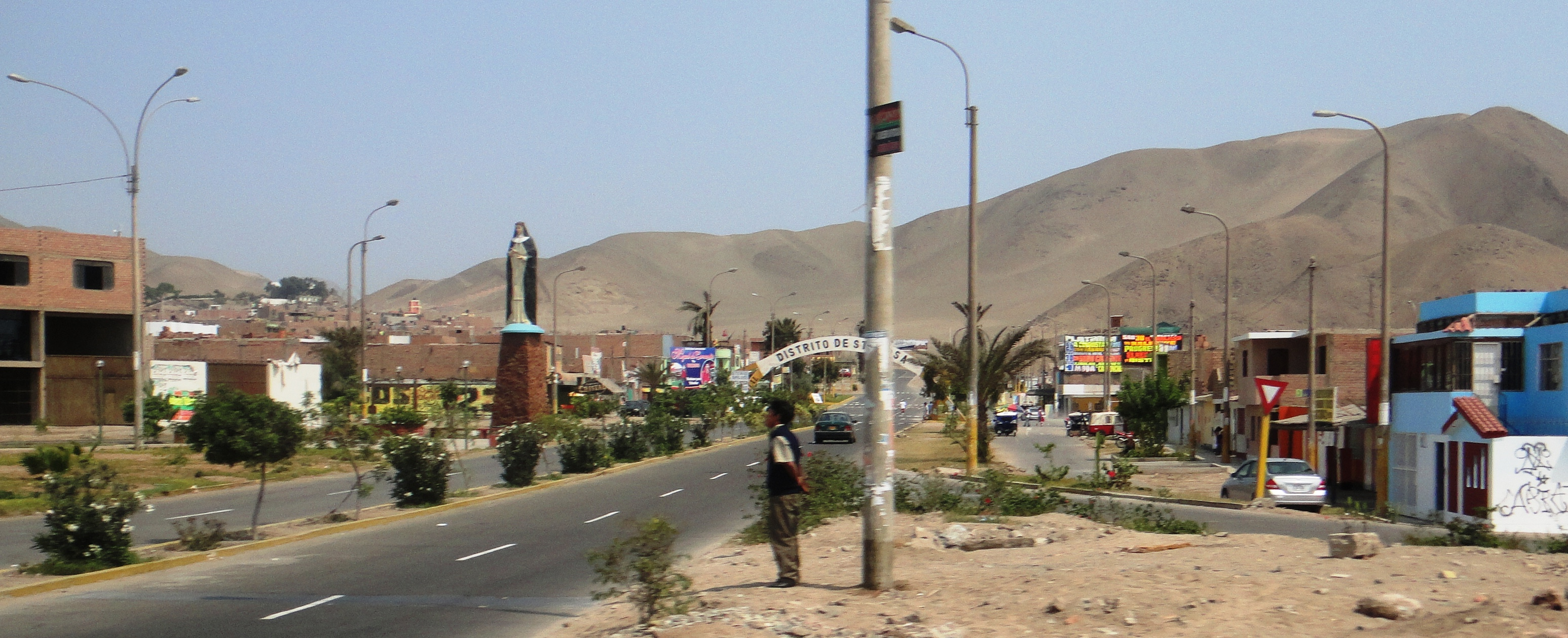

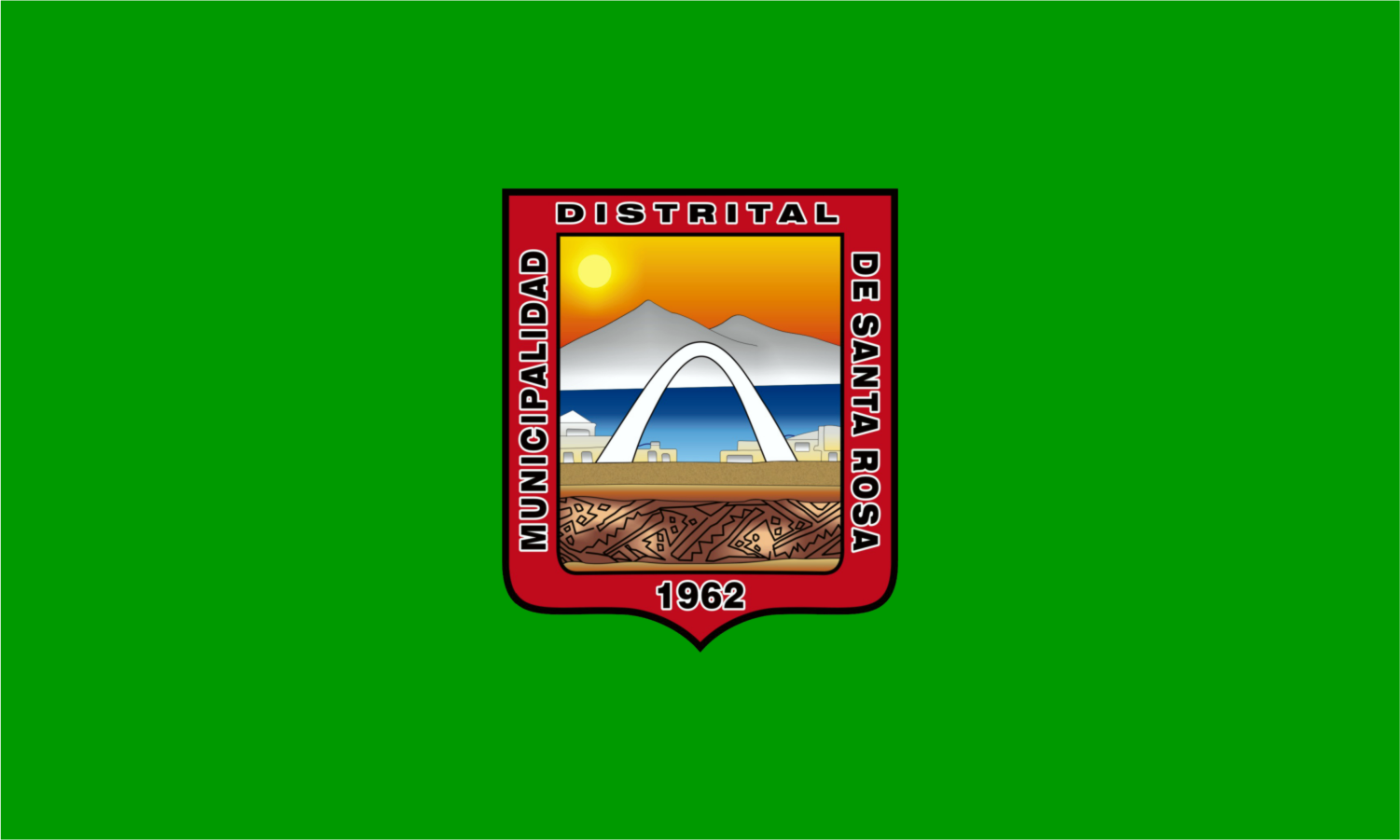
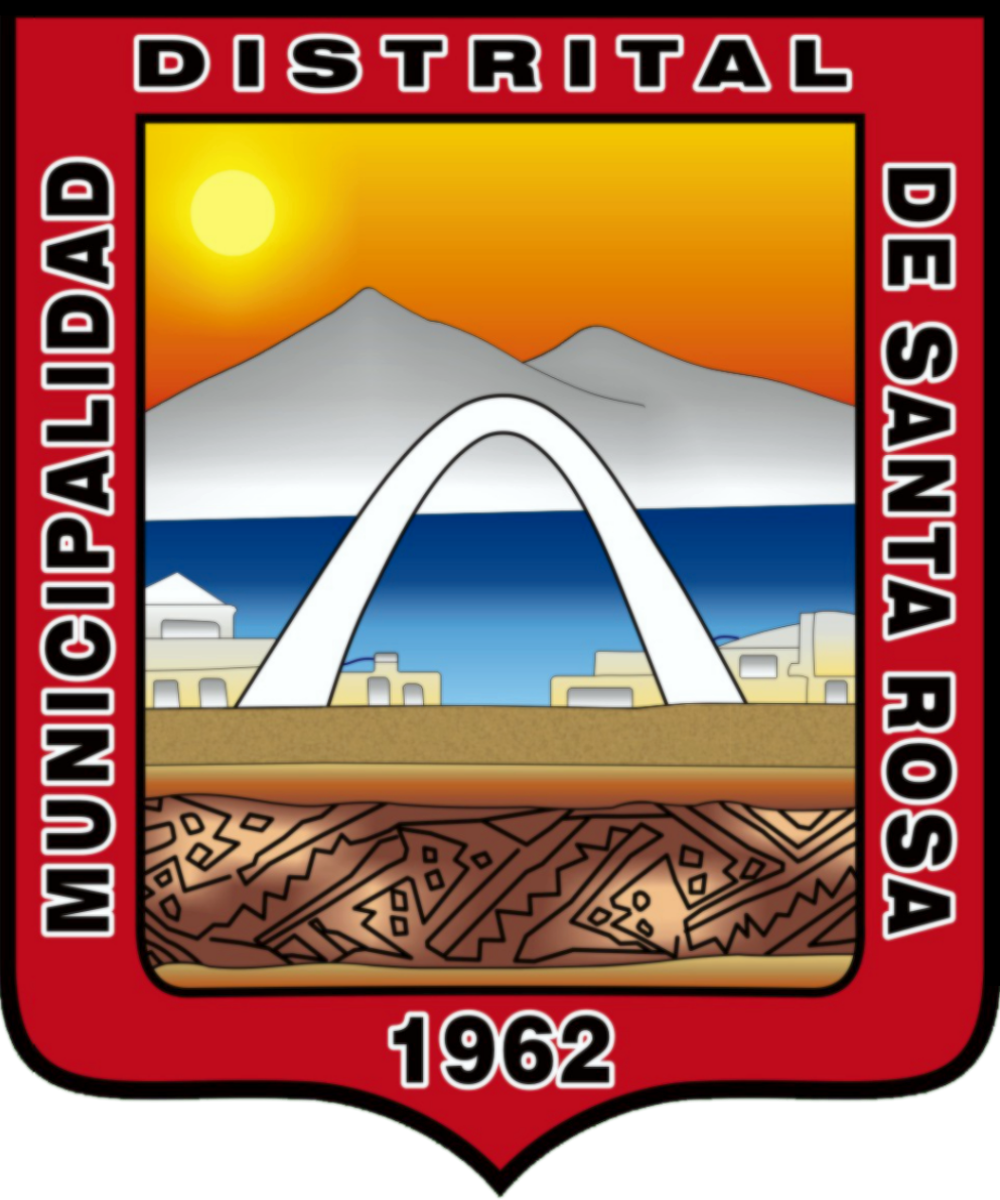
- Flag Coat of arms

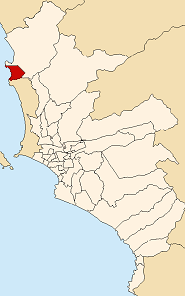
- Location of Santa Rosa in the Lima province
- Country: Peru
- Region: Lima
- Province: Lima
- Founded: February 6, 1962
- Capital: Santa Rosa

Government
  - Mayor: George Robles (2023-2026)

Area
  - Total: 21.5 km^{2} (8.3 sq mi)
- Elevation: 7 m (23 ft)

Population (2023)
  - Total: 41,619
  - Density: 1,940/km^{2} (5,010/sq mi)
- Time zone: UTC-5 (PET)
- UBIGEO: 150139
- Website: munisantarosa-lima.gob.pe

Santa Rosa is a district of Lima Province, Peru. Officially established as a district on February 6, 1962. It borders the Ancón District to the north and the east, the Pacific Ocean on the west, and the Ventanilla District on the south.

== History ==
The district of Santa Rosa was created on February 6, 1962, by Law No. 13982 signed by president Manuel Prado Ugarteche.

It is the district most visited by tourists in Lima North, and the headquarters of more than 500 companies, mostly in the field of transport, restaurants, advertising, internet, real estate and hotels.

== Geography ==
The district has a total land area of 21.5 km^{2}. Its administrative center is located 79 meters above sea level.

=== Boundaries ===
- North and East: Ancón
- South: Ventanilla (in the Callao Region)
- West: Pacific Ocean

== Demographics ==
Santa Rosa is the sixth least populated district of Lima with 18,751 inhabitants, only surpassed by Pucusana (17,786), Punta Negra (8,271), San Bartolo (7,989), Punta Hermosa (7,895), and Santa María del Mar (1,675).

11% of the inhabitants are children under 5 years of age. 11.8% are from 6 to 11 years old, and 11.2% are from 12 to 17 years old.

== Tourist sites ==
- Playa Grande, the only archaeological beach in Peru.
- Club de la Union.

== See also ==
- Administrative divisions of Peru
