= Súper Cóndor =

- Theatrical release poster
- Directed by: Alejandro Nieto-Polo
- Written by: Alejandro Nieto-Polo
- Produced by: Llanellys Carlín; Gianella Duanama; Alejandro Nieto-Polo
- Starring: Gerardo Zamora; José Luis Ruiz; Reynaldo Arenas
- Cinematography: Alejandro Nieto-Polo
- Edited by: Roberto Barba; Nathali Pacheco
- Music by: Ricardo Tafur; Nicolás Puga
- Production company: Nima Producciones
- Release dates: November 27, 2015 (Santa Anita); September 15, 2016 (Peru)
- Running time: 82 minutes
- Country: Peru
- Language: Spanish

Súper Cóndor is a 2015 Peruvian superhero film written and directed by Alejandro Nieto-Polo in his directorial debut. Starring Gerardo Zamora, José Luis Ruiz and Reynaldo Arenas. It is the first superhero movie produced in Peru.

== Synopsis ==
A corrupt politician is about to take over the country's government. An honest police officer wants to disrupt this network of corruption, but he is alone against the system. Meanwhile, an accountant struggling to support his son gains a special power and soon discovers its purpose: to save everyone.

== Cast ==
The actors participating in this film are:

- Gerardo Zamora as Pedro 'El Condor'
- Jose Luis Ruiz as Mayor Martínez
- Reynaldo Arenas as Victor
- Antonio Arrué
- Havier Arboleda
- Mayela Lloclla

== Release ==
The film had a limited theatrical release in Santa Anita on November 27, 2015. It was released commercially on September 16, 2016.

== Sequel ==
The film had a sequel titled El Cóndor en Nueva York (El Cóndor in New York) and was filmed 90% in the United States. It was released on September 15, 2018, in the US, and on January 15, 2021, in Peru.
