= Pucusana =

Village in Lima province, Peru

- Village
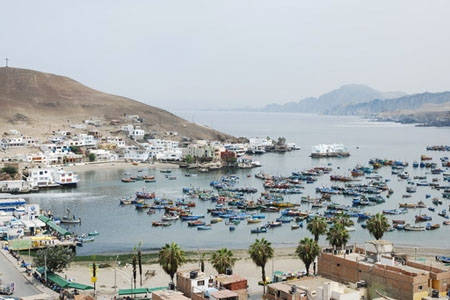
- Pucusana Bay

- Location within Peru
- Coordinates: 12°28′53.75″S 76°47′51.73″W
- Country: Peru
- Province: Lima
- District: Pucusana

Government
  - Mayor: Luis Chauca Navarro (2019-2022)
- Time zone: UTC-5 (PET)

Pucusana is a town in central Peru, capital of the district Pucusana in the province Lima.
