= El cebichito =

- Theatrical release poster
- Directed by: Martin Landeo
- Written by: Martin Landeo
- Starring: Estéfano Buchelli; Carlos Noriega
- Cinematography: Jorge Vilela de Rutte
- Edited by: Martin Landeo
- Production company: Nuevo Horizonte Films
- Distributed by: Star Films
- Release date: November 5, 2015
- Running time: 78 minutes
- Country: Peru
- Language: Spanish

El cebichito (lit. 'The cebichito') is a 2015 Peruvian sex comedy film written and directed by Martin Landeo. It stars Estéfano Buchelli and Carlos Noriega. It premiered on November 5, 2015, in Peruvian theaters.

== Synopsis ==
The entanglements of this couple of friends begin when Fabián invites two friends to the beach house, under the pretext of celebrating Sebastián's birthday to put into practice the benefits of the spiciest, tastiest dish and, above all, the most aphrodisiac: the black shell cebichito. Two phone calls surprise Sebastián. The first, from his mother, who accompanied by her aunts, devotees of the Holy Virgin of the Condemned, goes to greet him and pray for his health. And, the second, from Paula, who will give him the surprise of his life.

== Cast ==
The actors participating in this film are:

- Estéfano Buchelli as Sebastián
- Carlos Noriega as Fabián
- Glenda Flores
- Tara Morales Bermudez
- Cecilia Tosso
- Yraida Vasquez
- Flor Castillo
- Patricia Medina
- Pedro Olórtegui
- Margie Córdova
- Ramón García as Inspector

== Production ==
The film began its principal photography in 2011 in Lunahuaná, Pucusana, at the Ricardo Palma University, and with some sequences on location in Chorrillos.

== Reception ==
The film drew 1,066 viewers in its entire run in theaters.
