= Pascuala Rosado =

Peruvian community leader

Pascuala Rosado (1954-1996) was a Peruvian community leader from the district of Huaycán. She was killed by Shining Path in 1996. She had recently returned to Peru after spending several years abroad due to death threats. She was first targeted by Shining Path in 1992, after President Alberto Fujimori visited Huaycán to celebrate the formation of a new civilian anti-crime force. At the time Rosado was Huaycán's highest elected official. Rosado's murder was discussed in the final report of the Peruvian Truth and Reconciliation Commission.
