= San Luis District, Lima =

District in Lima, Peru

Coordinates: 12°04′32″S 76°59′46″W

San Luis
- District
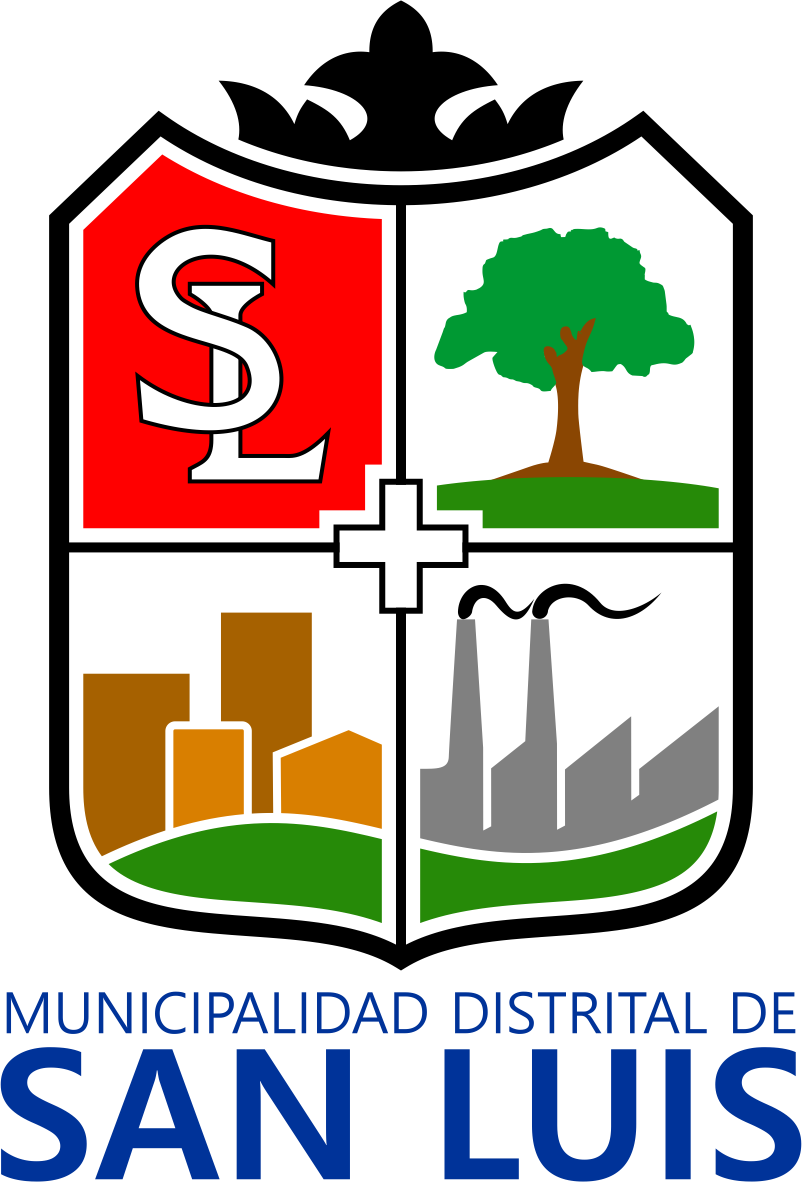
- Coat of arms

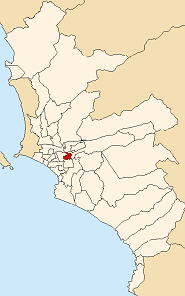
- Location of San Luis in the Lima province
- Country: Peru
- Region: Lima
- Province: Lima
- Founded: May 30, 1968
- Capital: San Luis
- Subdivisions: 1 populated center

Government
  - Mayor: Ricardo Pérez (2023-2026)

Area
  - Total: 3.49 km^{2} (1.35 sq mi)
- Elevation: 175 m (574 ft)

Population (2023)
  - Total: 58,001
  - Density: 16,600/km^{2} (43,000/sq mi)
- Time zone: UTC-5 (PET)
- UBIGEO: 150134
- Website: munisanluis.gob.pe

San Luis is a district of the Lima Province in Peru. In San Luis the National Sports Village is located in charge of the Peruvian Sports Institute, which has facilities for the practice of various sports (athletics, cycling, volleyball, swimming, softball and baseball). In addition, within its facilities is the headquarters of the Peruvian Olympic Committee and the Peruvian Football Federation (training place of the Peruvian Football Team, both senior and junior categories.

== History ==
It is part of city of Lima. Officially established as a district on May 30, 1968, by President Fernando Belaúnde.

The district's postal code is 30.

== Geography ==
The district has a total land area of 3.49 km^{2}. Its administrative center is located 175 meters above sea level.

=== Boundaries ===
- North: El Agustino
- East: Ate
- South: San Borja
- West: La Victoria

== Demographics ==
According to the 2005 census by the INEI, the district has 46,258 inhabitants, a population density of 13,254.4 persons/km^{2} and 11,901 households.

== See also ==
- Administrative divisions of Peru
