= Huaycán de Pariachi =

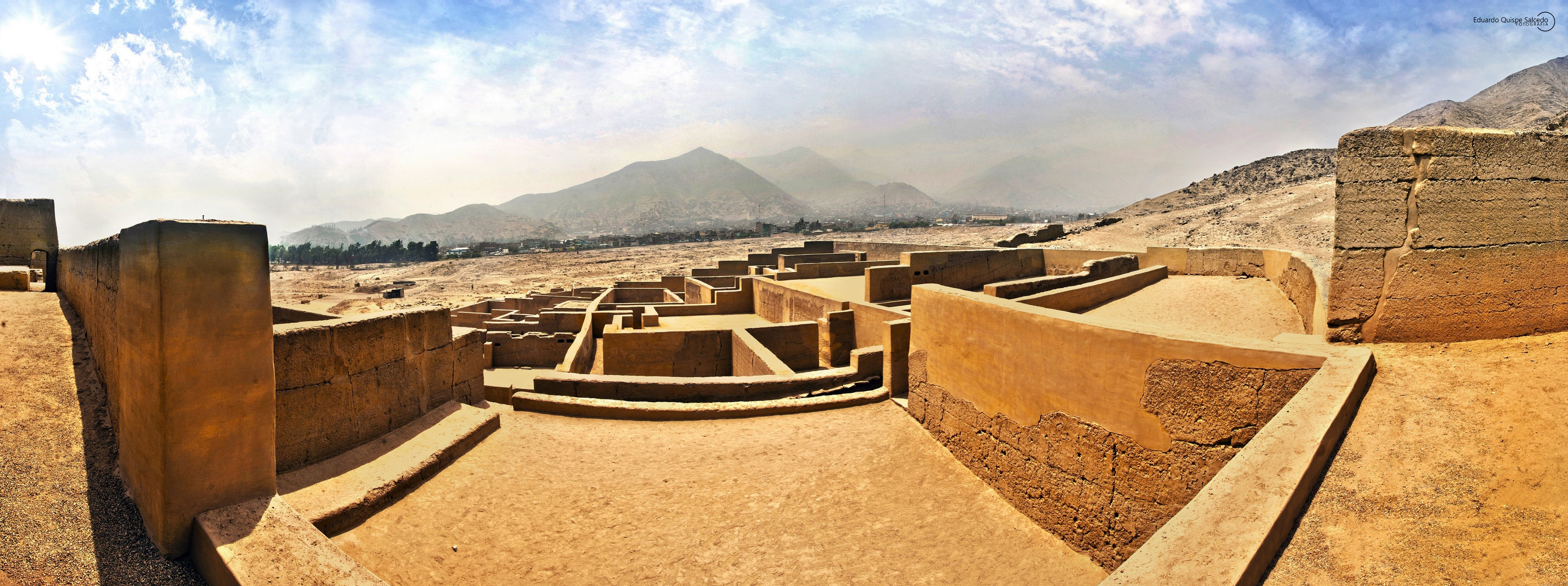
- Panoramic view of Huaycán de Pariachi

- Location within Peru
- 12°00′44″S 76°49′58″W
- Cultures: Ichma, Inca
- Location: Huaycán, Lima

Huaycán de Pariachi is an archaeological site in Peru located in Huaycán, Ate District, Lima. south of the Rímac River. At different times, it was part of the Ichma culture and the Inca Empire.

== Chronology ==
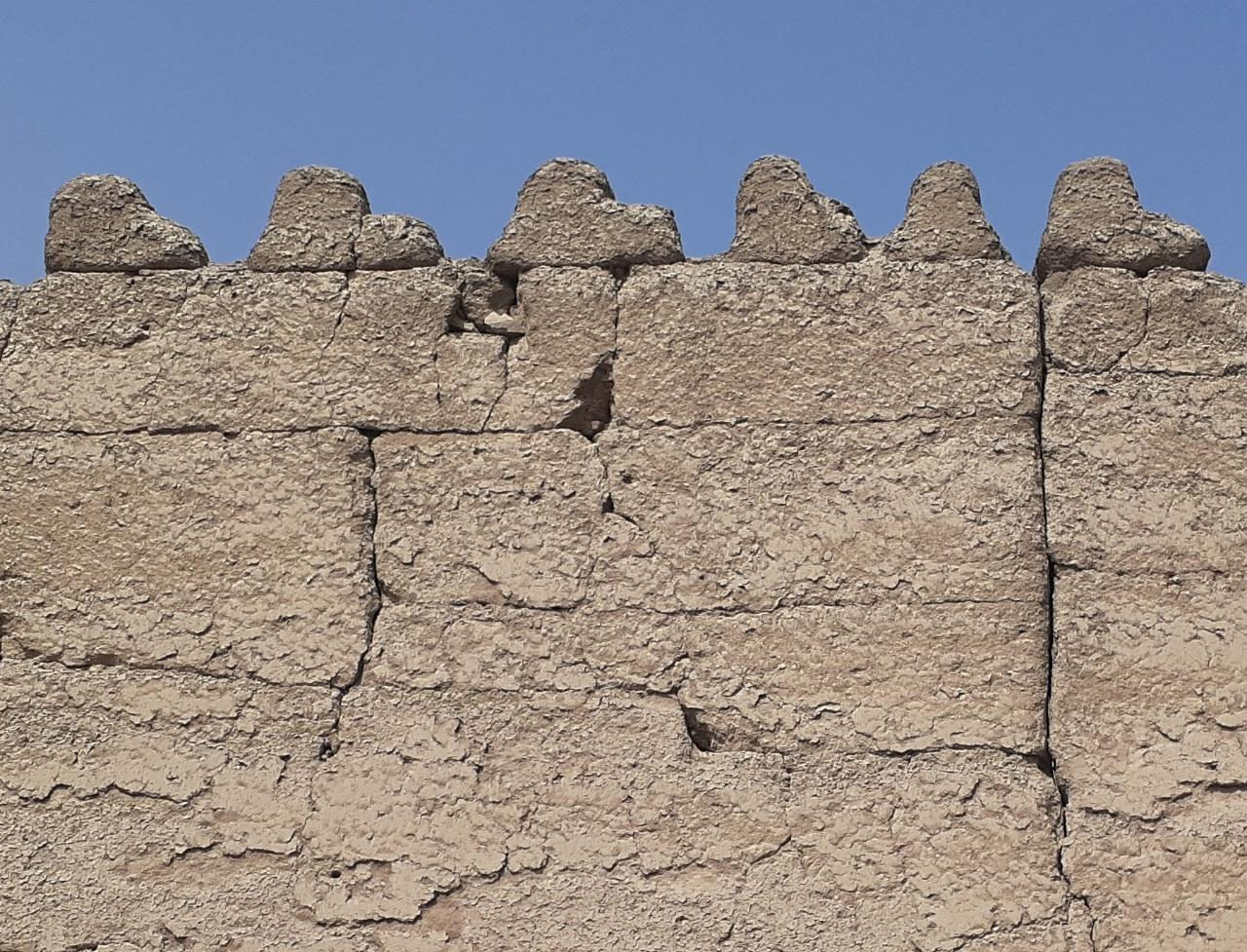
Crenellated wall

Although its antiquity likely dates back to the Preceramic Period, the few studies conducted have confirmed occupations by the Ychma (Late Intermediate Period) and the Inca (Late Horizon). The ZAMHP occupies approximately 60 hectares across its three sectors, although most visits focus on the only restored structure, known as the Palacio (Sector 1).

It was declared a Cultural Heritage of the Nation on October 10, 2000, through National Directorial Resolution No. 1189 issued by the then National Institute of Culture, now the Ministry of Culture.

== Description ==
Before the Spanish conquest, Huaycán de Pariachi was one of the main administrative centers of the middle Rímac Valley. During the Late Intermediate Period (900 - 1450 AD) the Ichma had a very important local presence, which lasted until the Late Horizon (1450 - 1532 AD), when the Incas arrived on the central coast and assimilated them.

Huaycán de Pariachi is divided into three sectors.

=== Sector 1 ===
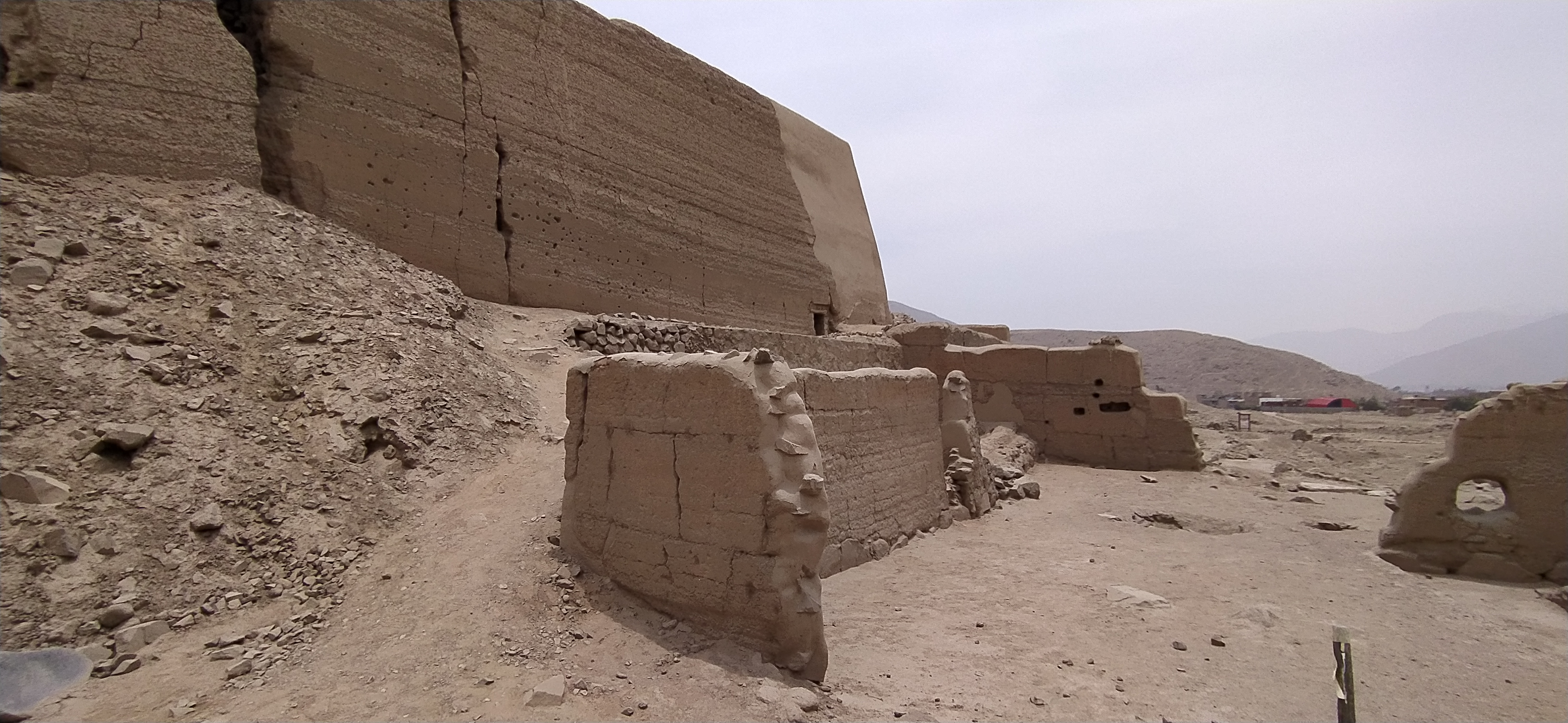
Remains of walls

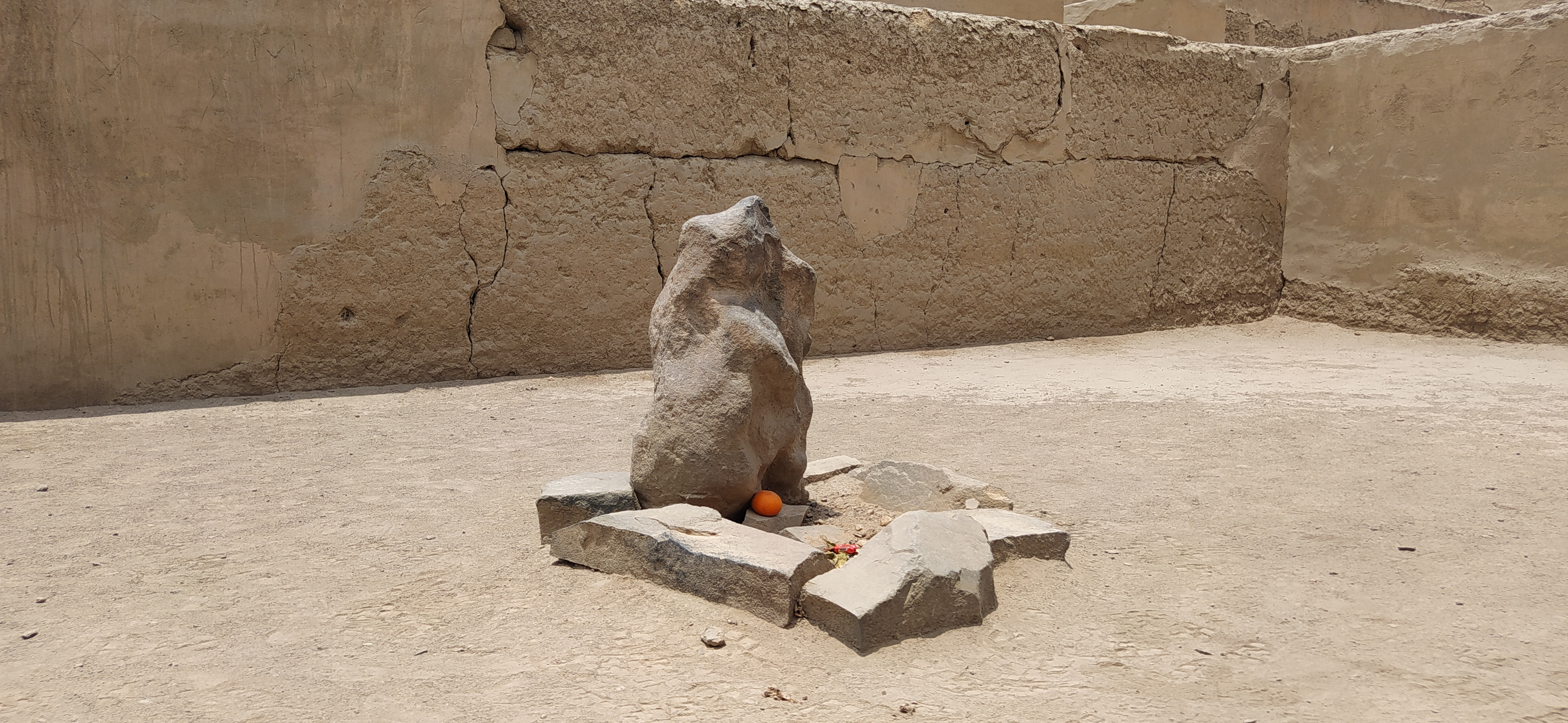
A huanca (monolith) in Huaycán de Pariachi

Sector 1 is the largest and consists of the remains of an ancient population or llaqta (Pariacha, according to the Huarochirí Manuscript). This sector has two zones: spaces used as residences for the elite (Palaces; one of them restored) and spaces used for other purposes (domestic, industrial, and ritual).

Architecturally, the restored Palacio is constructed using two techniques: rammed earth walls and stone and mud walls. It includes numerous spaces such as courtyards, open areas with benches, ramps, niches (not to be confused with niches carved into some walls, as some of them were used for funerary purposes during the colonial and republican eras), as well as numerous collqas (deep circular storage deposits, some shaped like a bottle) used for storing food.

=== Sector 2 ===
In Sector 2 (in front of the main entrance), a segment of an elevated walled road can be observed. This road was part of the network that formed the Qhapaq Ñan during the Late Horizon. It connected Pariacha with other administrative centers in the valley, such as San Juan de Pariachi, Huanchihuaylas (now Santa Clara), Mama (now Ricardo Palma), and, through the Molle ravine pass, with Huaycán de Cieneguilla and the main Qhapaq Ñan road from Hatun Xauxa to Pachacamac in the Lurín Valley.

=== Sector 3 ===
Sector 3 is separated from the previous two sectors and is located 1 km west of the entrance to Sector 1. It covers an area of 18 hectares within a perimeter of 553 m, adjacent to the Horacio Zevallos Housing Development. It presents structures with rammed earth walls, although they are in poor condition.

== Restoration and investigations ==
Huaycán de Pariachi has not been fully investigated. However, numerous archaeologists have visited the site, including Dr. Julio C. Tello in the 1940s. Arturo Jiménez Borja carried out restoration and conservation work in the 1970s. Archaeological explorations requested by the city of Huaycán before the INC in 1985, helped to delimit its intangible area. In 2015, the Archaeological Research Project of the Ministry of Culture of Peru was carried out.

== Images ==
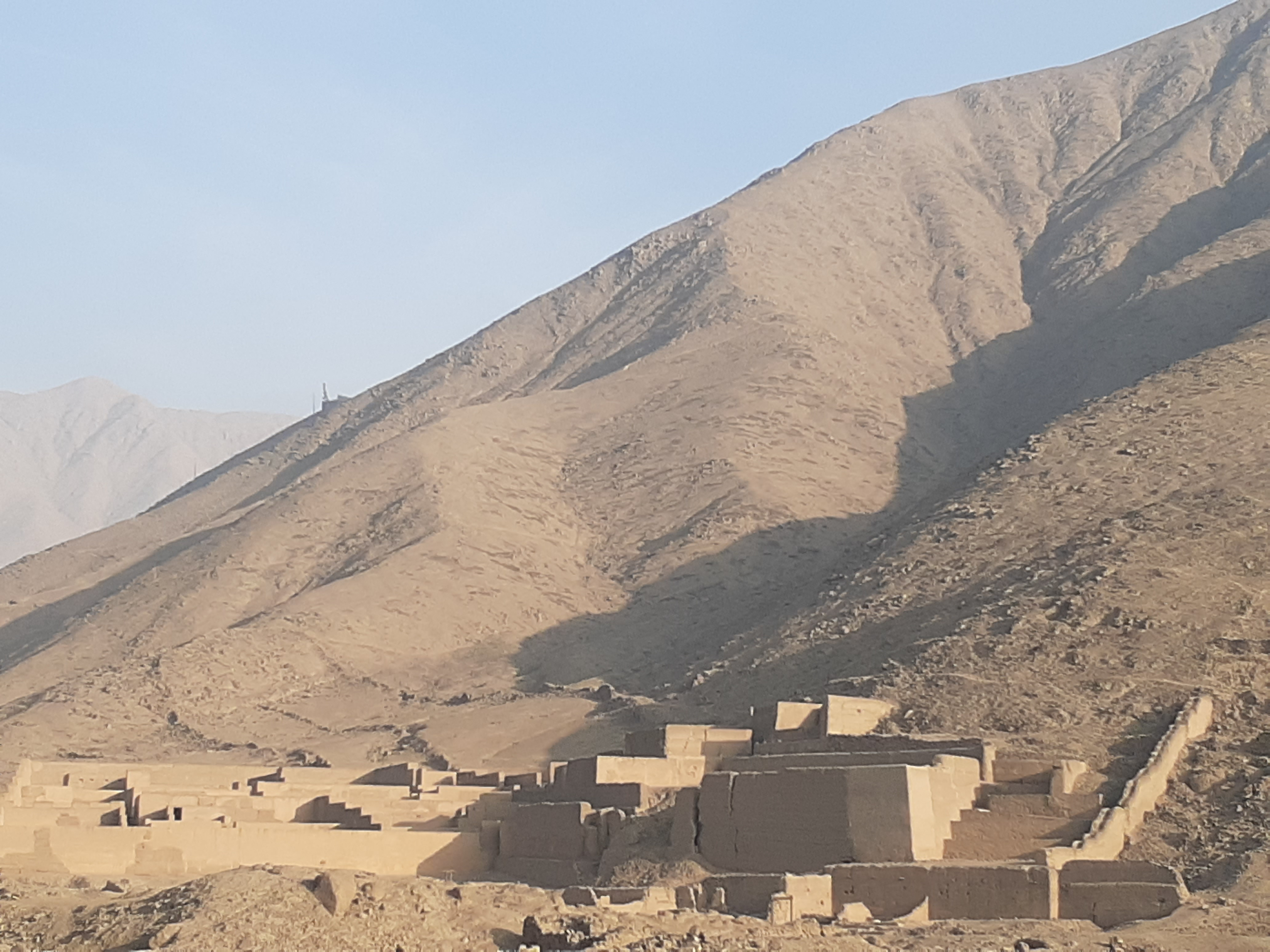
