= El Cóndor en Nueva York =

- Film poster
- Directed by: Alejandro Nieto-Polo
- Written by: Alejandro Nieto-Polo; José Luis Ruiz; Jorge Cerna
- Produced by: Ivan Andia; Matthew Cullipher; Lucio Fernandez; Alejandro Nieto-Polo
- Starring: Gerardo Zamora; José Luis Ruiz; Matthew Cullipher
- Cinematography: Jorge Cerna
- Music by: Matthew Cullipher
- Production company: Nima Producciones
- Release dates: 15 September 2018 (North America); 15 January 2021 (Peru)
- Running time: 97 minutes
- Country: Peru
- Languages: Spanish; English

El Cóndor en Nueva York (lit. 'El Cóndor in New York') is a 2018 Peruvian superhero film directed by Alejandro Nieto-Polo and written by Nieto-Polo, José Luis Ruiz & Jorge Cerna. It is a sequel of the 2015 Peruvian film Super Cóndor.

== Cast ==
The actors participating in this film are:

- Gerardo Zamora as Pedro 'El Condor'
- Jose Luis Ruiz as Jorge Martinez
- Matthew Cullipher as Damian Dimitri
- Angelo Paravalos as Frank Smith
- Ricardo J. Salazar as Agent Ramirez
- Yesi Rodriguez as Agent Rogers
- Ivan Andia as Agent Fernandez
- Lucio Fernandez as Fernando Valenzuela
- Asier Kintana as Juan Jimenez
- Ivana Loli as Claudia Smith

== Production ==
Filming lasted 20 days in different locations throughout New York City. 90% of the total film was shot in New York City.

== Release ==
El Cóndor en Nueva York was released on 15 September 2018, in theaters in the United States and Mexico. On 15 and 16 January 2021, it arrived at Peruvian drive-ins.
