= Flag of Lima =

Flag of the capital city of Peru

Flag of Lima

The flag of Lima (and the surrounding province) consists of a gold background. The city seal is shown in the center of the flag. The motto on the coat of arms is "Hoc signum vere regum est", loosely translated from Latin as "Truly this is the sign of the king", referring to Christ's dominion.

Francisco Pizarro "founded Lima on the Day of the Kings...it was for this reason that Lima took as its arms and device the three crowns of the holy Kings and the shining star that appeared to them."

== See also ==
- Coat of arms of Lima
