= Ancón District =

District in Lima, Peru

Coordinates: 11°44′S 77°09′W

Ancón
- District
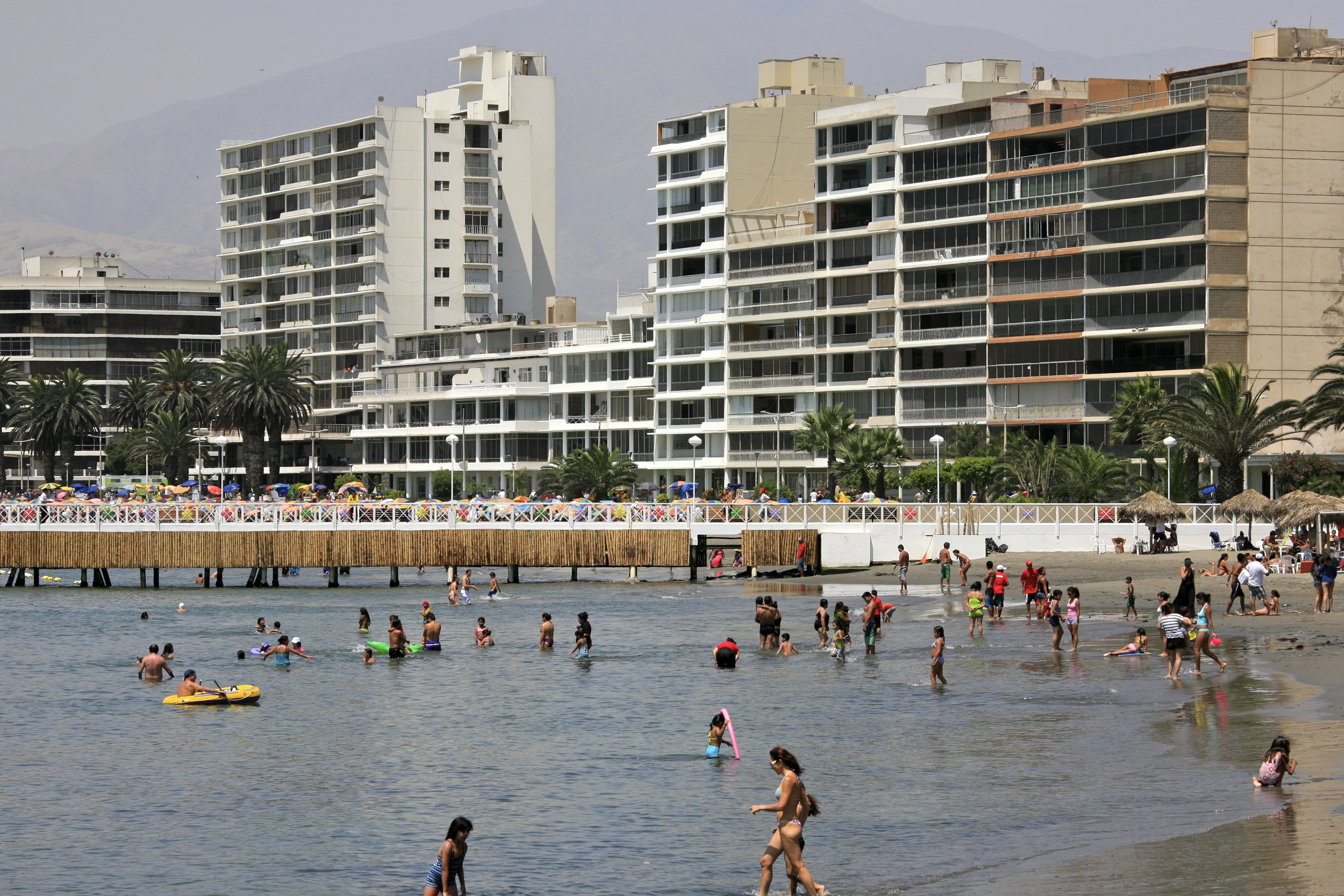
- Apartments in Ancón

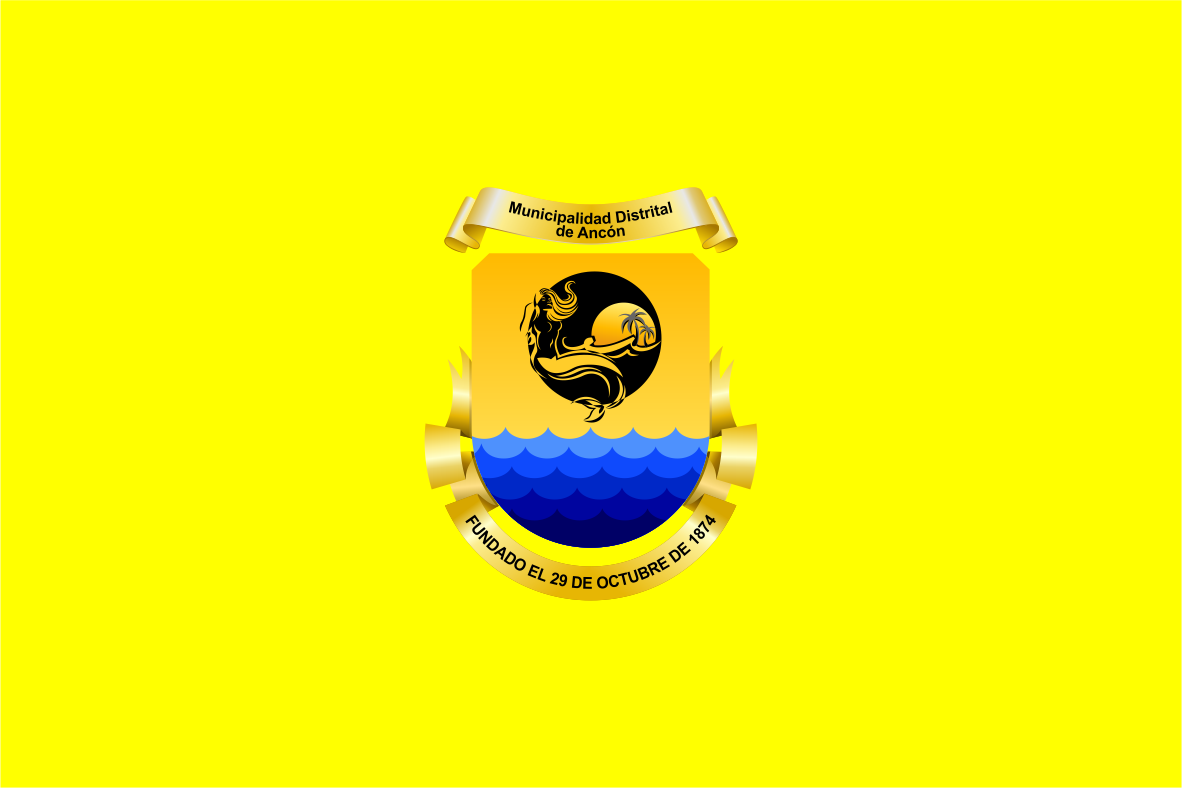
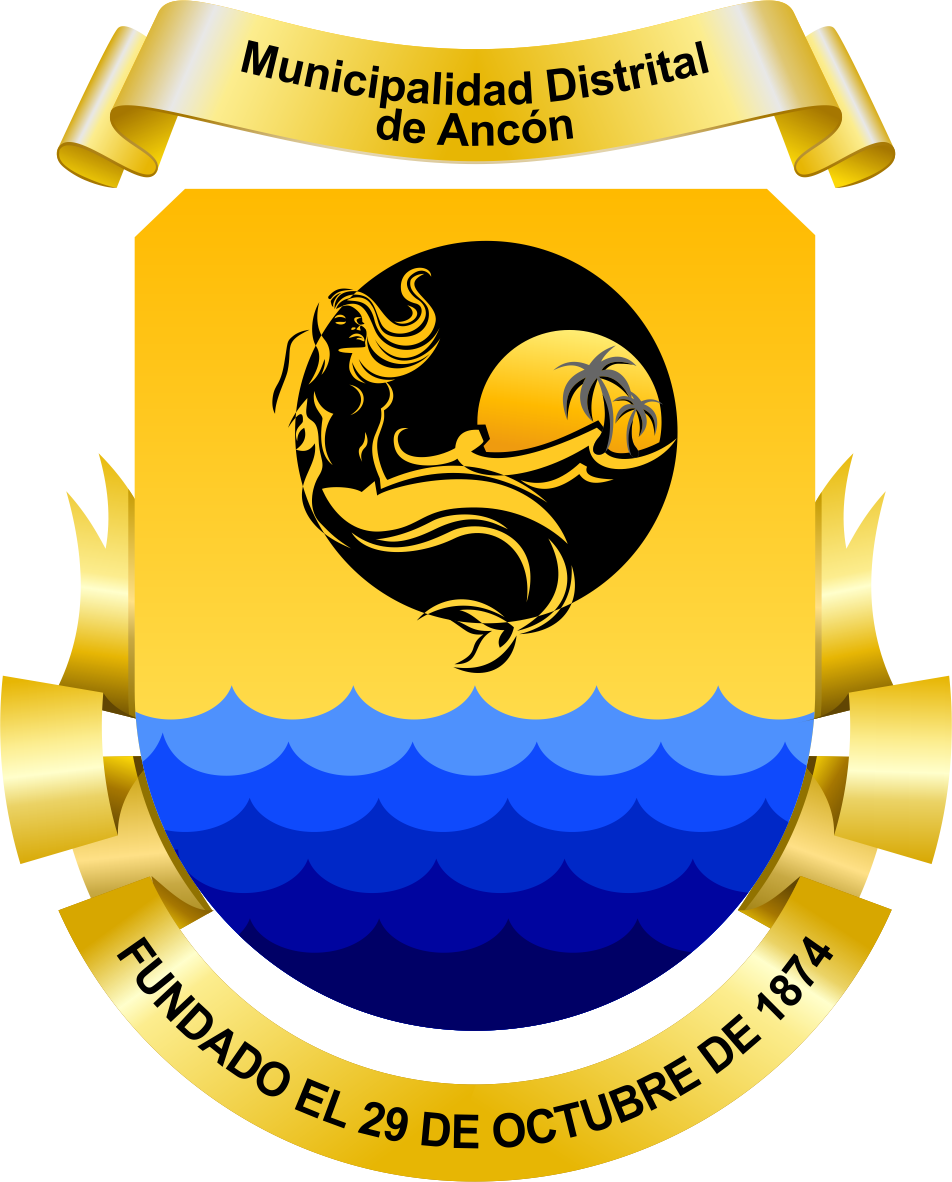
- Flag Coat of arms

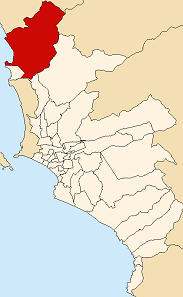
- Location of Ancón in the Lima province
- Country: Peru
- Region: Lima
- Province: Lima
- Founded: October 29, 1874
- Capital: Ancón
- Subdivisions: 2 populated centers

Government
  - Mayor: Samuel Daza (2023-2026)

Area
  - Total: 299.22 km^{2} (115.53 sq mi)
- Elevation: 3 m (9.8 ft)

Population (2023)
  - Total: 91,170
  - Density: 304.7/km^{2} (789.1/sq mi)
- Time zone: UTC-5 (PET)
- UBIGEO: 150102
- Website: muniancon.gob.pe

Ancón is a district of northern Lima Province in Peru. It is a popular beach resort destination of Lima, visited every summer by millions of people from Lima. It is the largest district of the Lima Province.

Ancon was officially established as a district on October 29, 1874, segregating itself from the Carabayllo district. The current mayor (alcalde) of Ancón is John Barrera Bernui. The district's postal code is 2.

== History ==
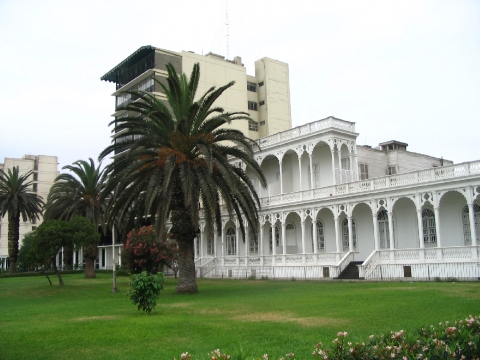
Old-style house in the Ancón beach area

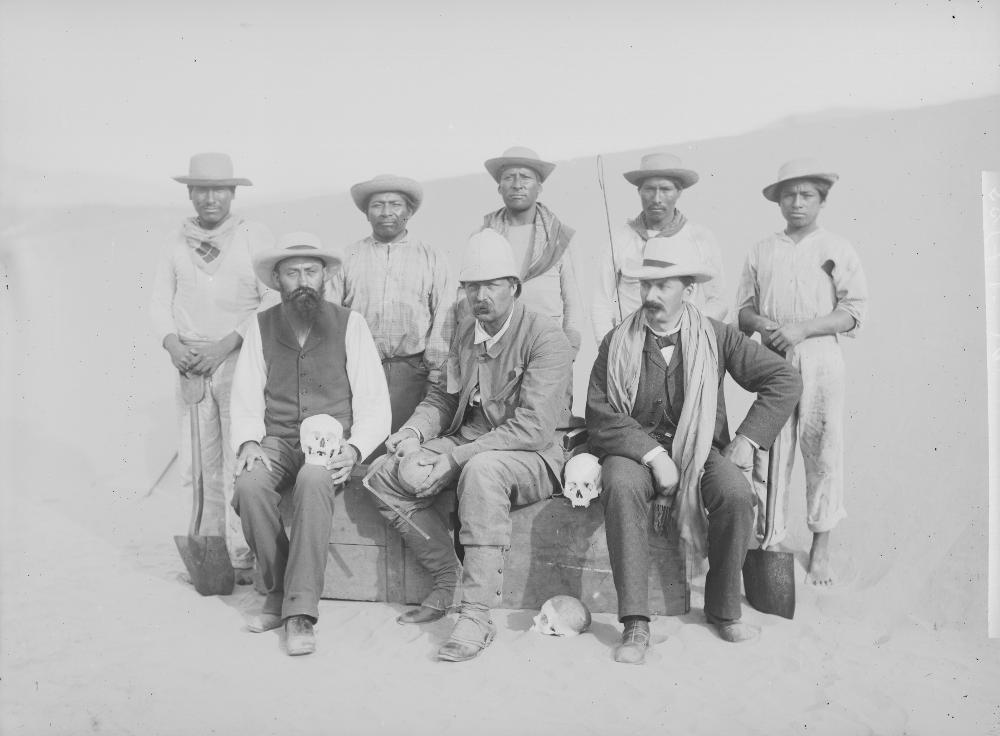
Hjalmar Stolpe in Ancón, Peru during the Vanadis expedition

Ancón is an important site in Peruvian history and archaeology. This was a fishing town and as a burying ground for pre-Inca Indigenous civilizations of Ancon-Supe, which flourished about 4,000 years ago as one of the oldest societies in Peruvian history.

In Ancon (archaeological site), the ridges of gravel and sandy soil were littered with skulls, bones, and remnants of tattered handwoven cloth. Beneath the surface, grave robbers found mummified bodies with all the accompanying grave goods in shallow graves.

In this region, the preservation of the bodies was due to the dry climate, and also reportedly, the saltpetre and other preservative elements contained in the soil.

In the late 1800s, archaeologists digging here found bodies, sometimes tattooed, adorned with beads, copper earrings and bird feathers, and swathed in richly colored blankets or cotton cloth, with jars of provisions beside them. Tablets fashioned of cloth, stretched upon frames of wood and painted with figures and characters, described the virtues of the deceased.

Pre-historic Ancón was a fishing village, so many handmade nets were found, along with baskets of woven fibre representing the industries of women.

The extension of the railroad in 1870 to Chancay made the Necropolis of Ancón easily accessible to the day visitor. The geologists Reiss and Stubel conducted their excavations at Ancón during the period 1874-1875 because they feared the extent of digging there would quickly deplete the site. In 1884 Stolpe conducted excavations at Ancon on behalf of the Museum of Ethnography in Stockholm.

Modern buildings and old houses dating back to the 19th century can be found in the district's beach area. Ancón has a yacht club that exists since 1950.

The Treaty of Ancón, that ended the War of the Pacific, was signed on October 20, 1883, ceding Tarapacá to Chile.

== Geography ==
The district has a total land area of 299.22 km^{2} (116 sq mi). Its administrative center is located 3 meters above sea level.

Boundaries

- North: Aucallama District (Huaral Province)
- East: Huamantanga District (Canta Province), Carabayllo District
- South: Santa Rosa and Puente Piedra, as well as Ventanilla in the Constitutional Province of Callao
- West: Pacific Ocean

== Political division ==
The district is divided into 2 populated centers (Spanish: Centros Poblados):

- Ancón
- Piedras Gordas

== Demographics ==
According to the 2005 census by the INEI, the district has 29,419 inhabitants, a population density of 98.3 persons/km² and 12,990 households. It is the second largest district and the 40th most populous district in Lima.

== Beach resort ==
Ancón used to be a deluxe upscale beach resort during the 19th and early 20th centuries. Its sandy soil and dry atmosphere made it a welcome place for persons with pulmonary and bronchial affections. Besides the beach, in 1913, there was a tennis court, one or two hotels, and many cottages. The train trip from Desamparados station in downtown Lima took about an hour and a half through dry desert.

After the population crisis in the city, especially in the north of Lima, close to the old exclusive spas. Some wealthy families started to find for a best place for settle down in summer. And today, the beach remains popular despite the fact that most of the upscale housing has moved to the beaches south of Lima, such as Santa María del Mar, Punta Hermosa, Punta Negra, Asia, among others.

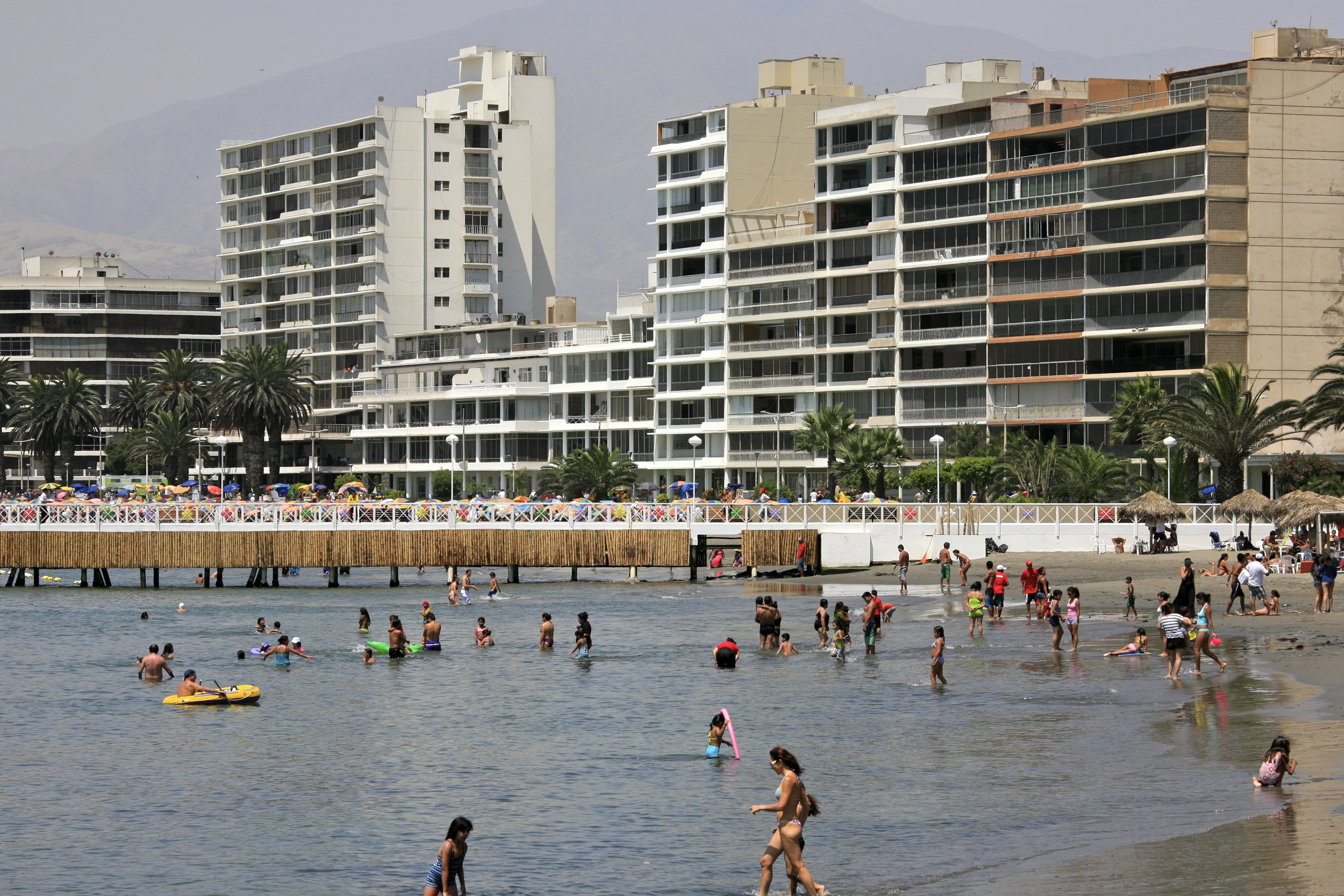
Ancon Beach Resort

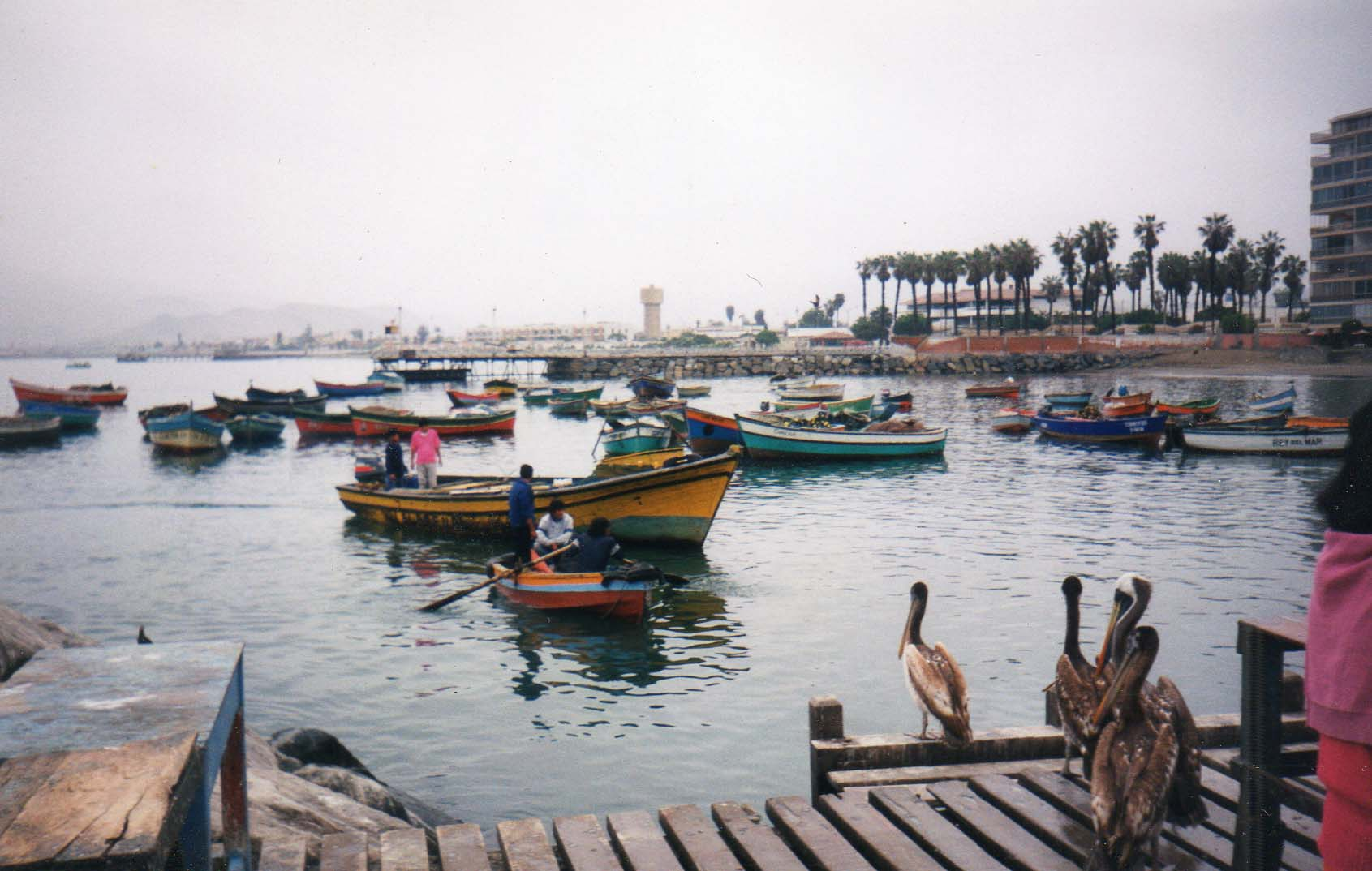
Ancon, Peru, Pelicans gather hopefully at the harbour as the catch is landed..

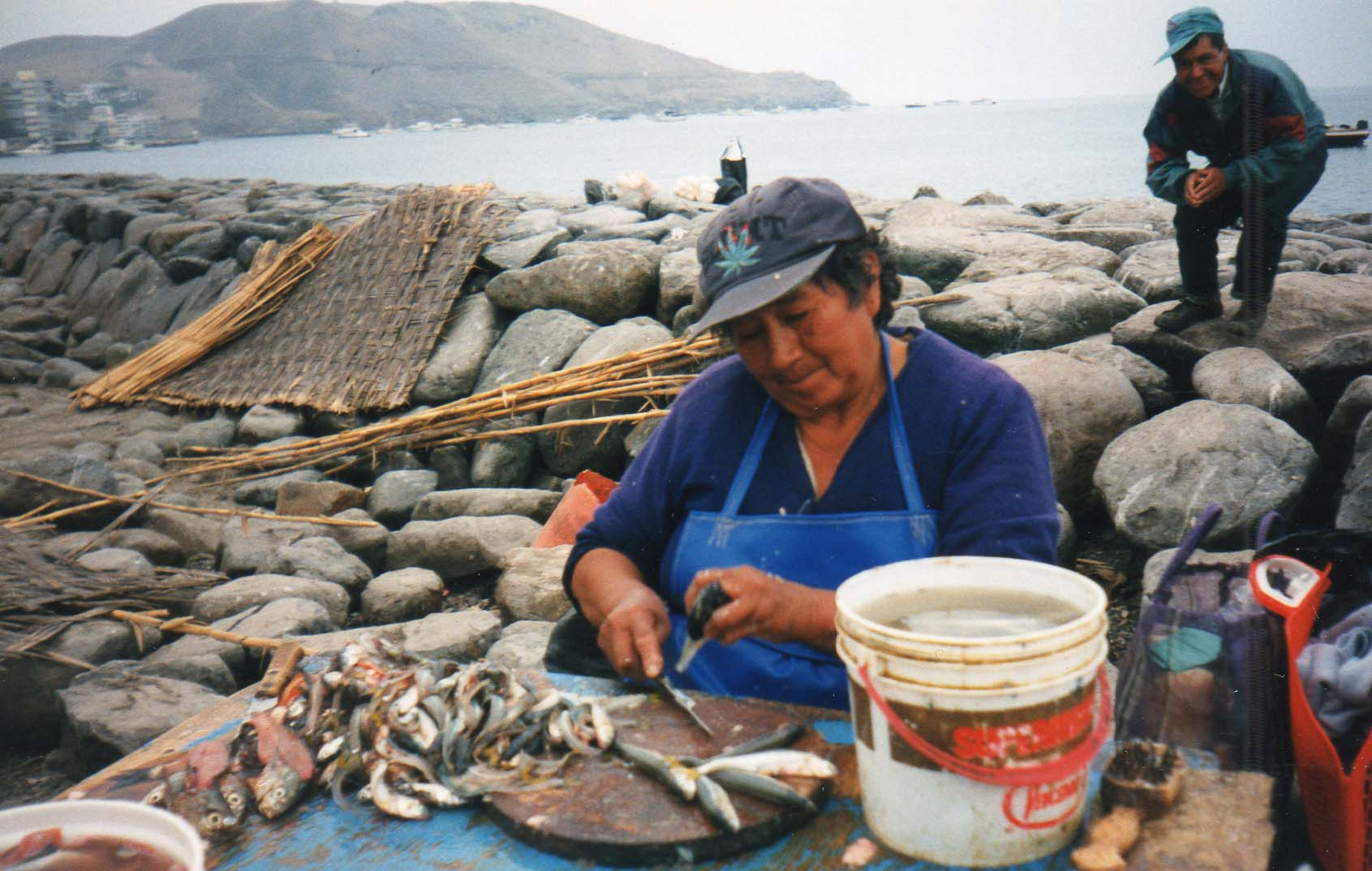
Ancon, Peru. Fisherfolk gutting the catch.

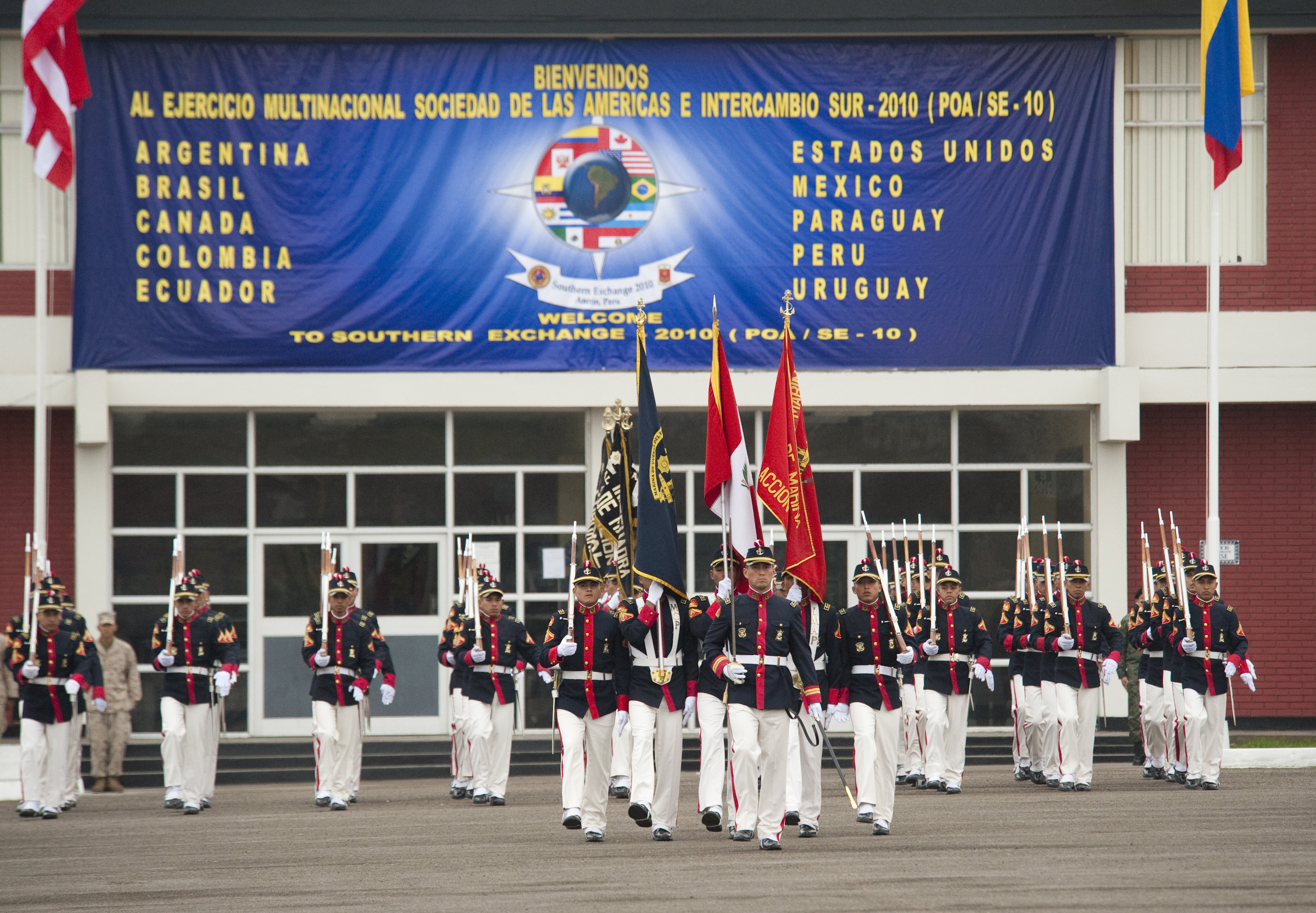
Members of the Peruvian Marine Drill Team Ancon Marine Base

== See also ==
- Administrative divisions of Peru
