= El Agustino =

District in Lima, Peru

- District
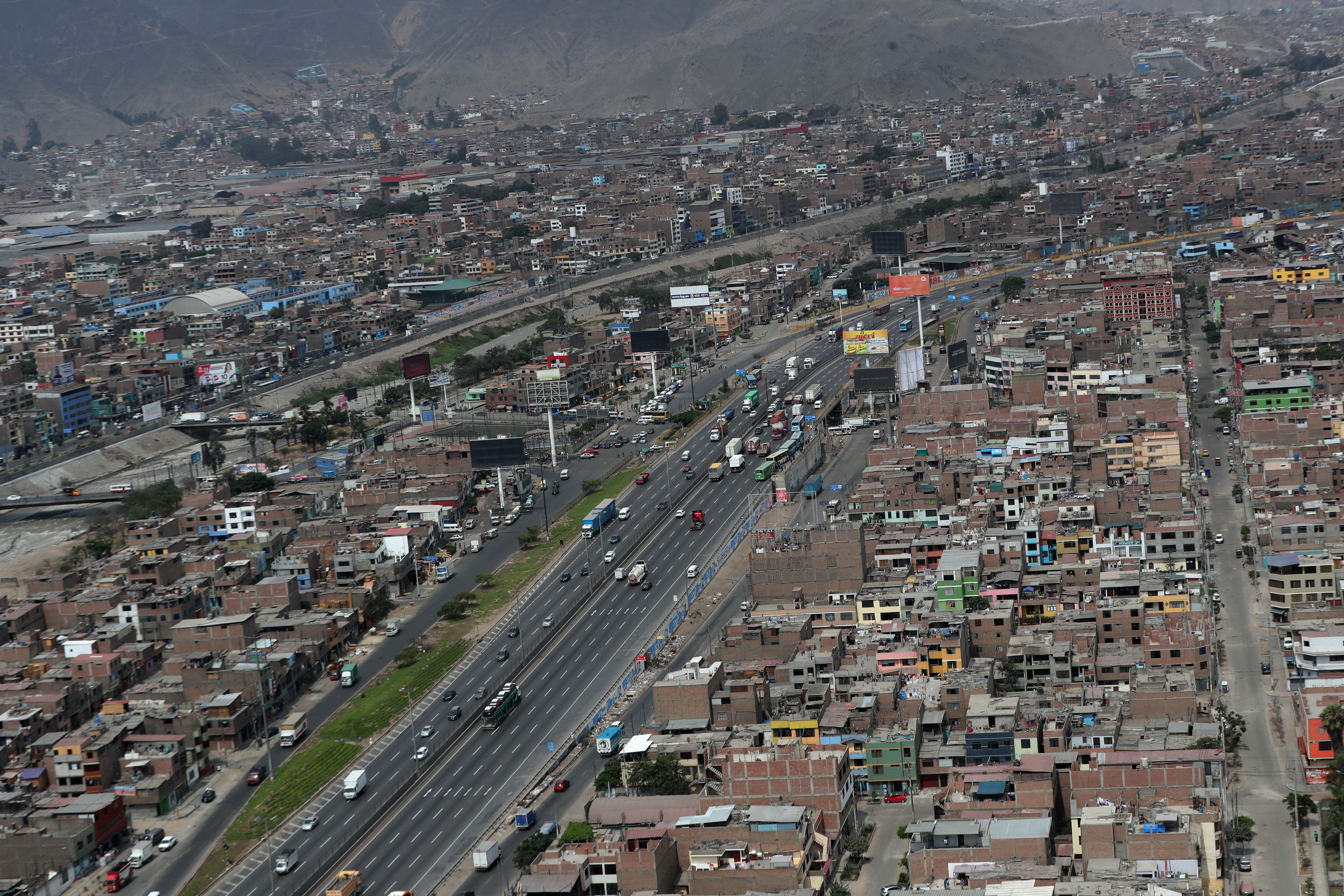

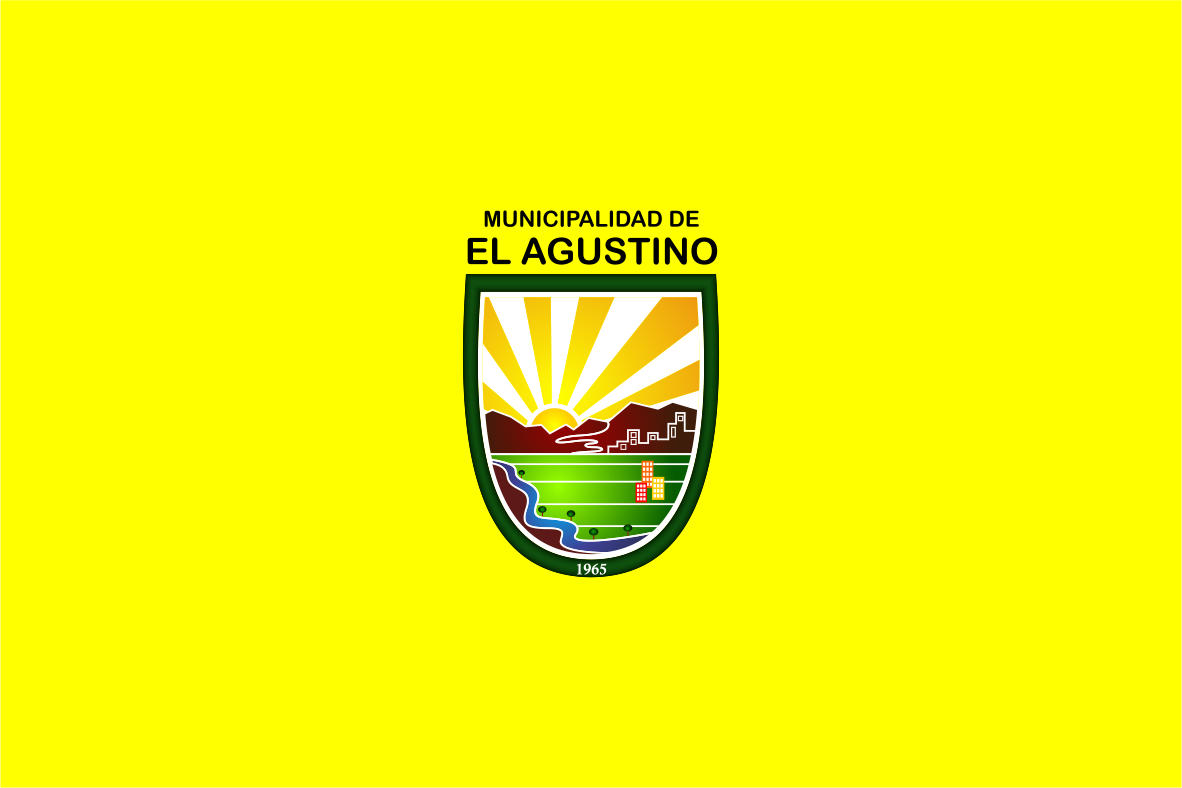
- Flag Coat of arms

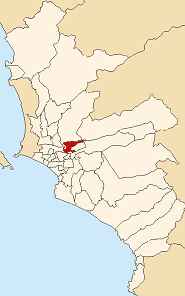
- Location of The Augustinian in the Lima province
- Coordinates: 12°04′S 77°01′W
- Country: Peru
- Region: Lima
- Province: Lima
- Founded: January 6, 1965

Government
  - Mayor: Richard Soria (2023-2026)

Area
  - Total: 12.54 km^{2} (4.84 sq mi)
- Elevation: 197 m (646 ft)

Population (2023)
  - Total: 233,757
  - Density: 18,640/km^{2} (48,280/sq mi)
- Time zone: UTC-5 (PET)
- UBIGEO: 150111
- Website: munielagustino.gob.pe

El Agustino is a district of the Lima Province in Peru. It is part of the city of Lima, and it was established as a district on January 6, 1965. The current mayor (alcalde) of El Agustino is Richard Robert Soria Fuerte. The district's postal code is 10.

== Geography ==
The district has a total land area of 12.54 km^{2}. Its administrative center is located 197 meters above sea level. Initially, the boundary with Ate was delineated by the Río Surco irrigation ditch. However, in 1989, the eastern section of El Agustino, situated east of the El Agustino hill, separated to establish the Santa Anita district. This newly formed district incorporated the Santa Anita section of Ate along with surrounding areas.

=== Boundaries ===
- North: San Juan de Lurigancho and Lurigancho-Chosica
- East: Ate and Santa Anita
- South: Ate, San Luis, Lima
- West: Lima

== Demographics ==
According to a 2002 estimate by the INEI, the district has 166,177 inhabitants and a population density of 13,251.8 persons/km^{2}. In 1999, there were 32,910 households in the district. It is the 25th most populated district in Lima.
