= Lima province =

Province of Peru

Lima
- Province
- Flag Coat of arms

- Location of Lima in Peru
- Coordinates: 12°02′06″S 77°01′07″W
- Country: Peru
- Department: Lima (Note: The province of Lima is not under the jurisdiction of the department's regional government, but under that of the Metropolitan Municipality of Lima, which also administers the district of the same name.)
- Founded: January 18, 1535
- Capital: Lima
- Districts: List: Ancón; Ate; Barranco; Breña; Carabayllo; Chaclacayo; Chorrillos; Cieneguilla; Comas; El Agustino; Independencia; Jesús María; La Molina; La Victoria; Lima; Lince; LosOlivos; Lurigancho-Chosica; Lurin; Magdalena del Mar; Miraflores; Pachacámac; Pucusana; Pueblo Libre; Puente Piedra; Punta Hermosa; Punta Negra; Rímac; San Bartolo; San Borja; San Isidro; San Juan de Lurigancho; San Juan de Miraflores; San Luis; San Martín de Porres; San Miguel; Santa Anita; Santa María del Mar; Santa Rosa; Surco; Surquillo; Villa El Salvador; Villa María del Triunfo

Government
  - Mayor: Rafael López Aliaga

Area
  - Total: 2,672.28 km^{2} (1,031.77 sq mi)

Population (2023)
  - Total: 11,321,000
  - Density: 4,236.5/km^{2} (10,972/sq mi)
- Time zone: UTC-5 (PET)
- UBIGEO: 1501
- Website: www.munlima.gob.pe

Lima (Spanish pronunciation: [ˈli.ma]), also called Metropolitan Lima (Spanish: Lima Metropolitana), is a province of the department of Lima, Peru. Located in its central coast, it operates under a quasi-autonomous special regime, and is thus not under the jurisdiction of the department's regional government. Its capital is Lima, which is also the nation's capital.

Despite its small area, this province is the major industrial and economic powerhouse of the Peruvian economy. It concentrates almost one-third of the country's population and 50% of Peru's GDP in 2012.

== History ==
The province was created in 1821, as Peru's territory was divided into departments, provinces, districts and parishes. The province was part of the department of Lima, which was formed by the territories of present-day Lima, Callao and Ica regions, and the provinces of Casma, Huarmey and Santa, which later would be part of the La Costa Department.

The department was further subdivided as time passed but the province of Lima kept being part of it. Due to the massive migration from other areas of the country, the need to separate the province from the rest of the department was forecast by experts.

In 2002, the new regionalization law passed by President Alejandro Toledo made the province a quasi-autonomous entity, as it was not under the jurisdiction of the newly created Regional Government of Lima.

== Politics ==
The province of Lima is administered by the Metropolitan Municipality of Lima, equal in status to a regional government, which also administers Lima District.

=== List of mayors ===
Since 2023, the incumbent mayor is Rafael López Aliaga (2023–2026).

=== Subdivisions ===
The province is divided into 43 districts. Each of them is headed by a mayor, although the Metropolitan Municipality of Lima (Municipalidad Metropolitana de Lima), led by the mayor of Lima, also exercises its authority in these districts. These districts are grouped together into four sectors: Central Lima, North Lima, East Lima, and South Lima.

All the districts of Lima province are fused together in a continuous urban area, with the exception of the beach resort of Ancón and Santa Rosa in the north and Punta Hermosa, Punta Negra, San Bartolo, Santa Maria del Mar and Pucusana in the south.

== Geography ==
=== Boundaries ===
- North: province of Huaral
- Northeast: province of Canta
- East: province of Huarochirí
- South: province of Cañete
- West: province of Callao and the Pacific Ocean.

=== Climate ===
From April to December, Lima is often covered in coastal fog and mist, while in January to late March, the weather is generally sunny.

== Culture ==
=== Tourism ===
Lima has various tourist destinations and activities, including pre-Inca period pyramids, museums and modern shopping malls. There are many restaurants, some of which specialize in fresh seafood, bars and nightclubs. There are many beaches for sunbathing, swimming and fishing.

== See also ==
- Department of Lima
- Provinces of Peru
