= Santa Anita District =

District in Lima, Peru

Coordinates: 12°02′35″S 76°57′30″W

Santa Anita
- District
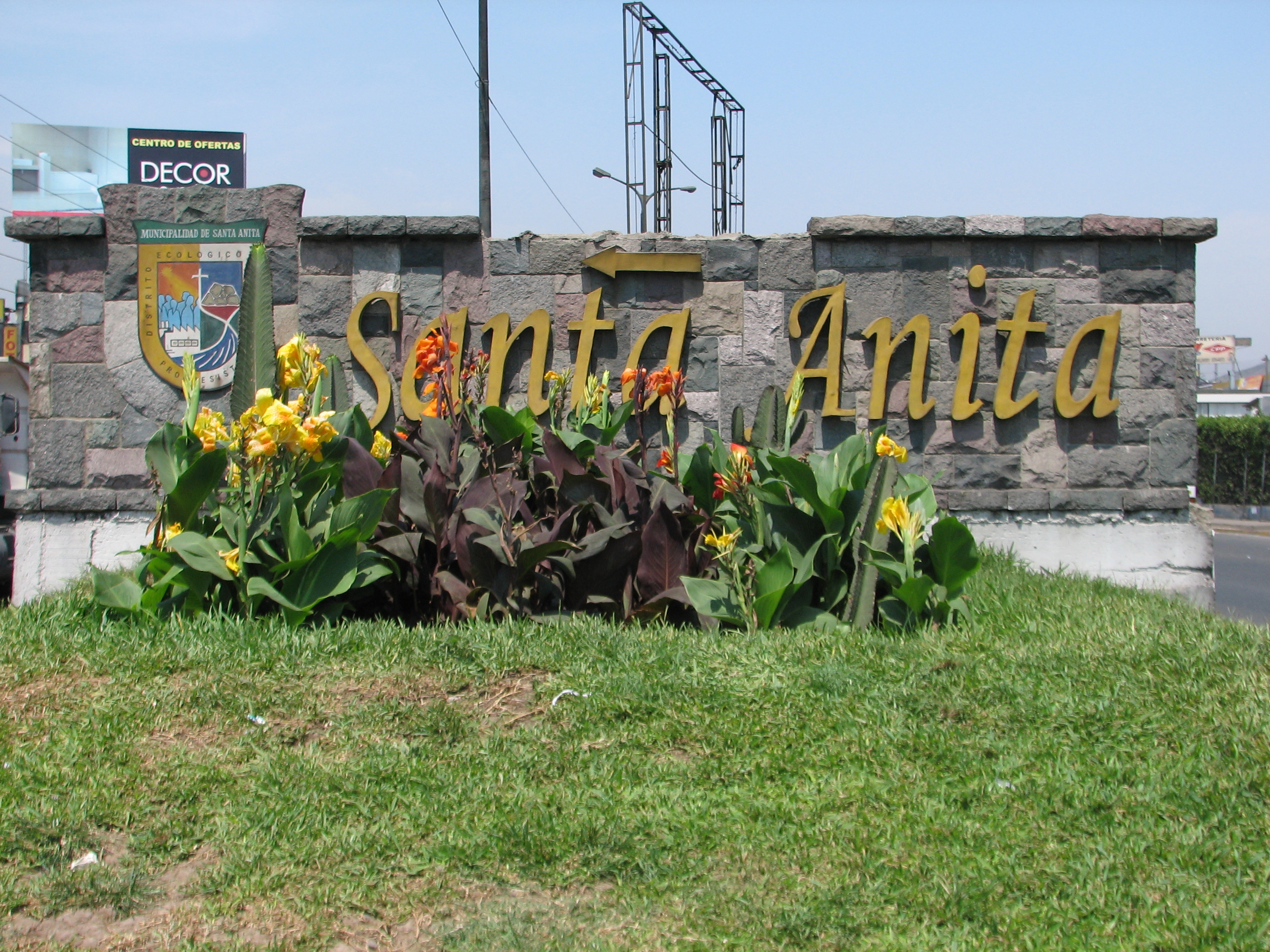

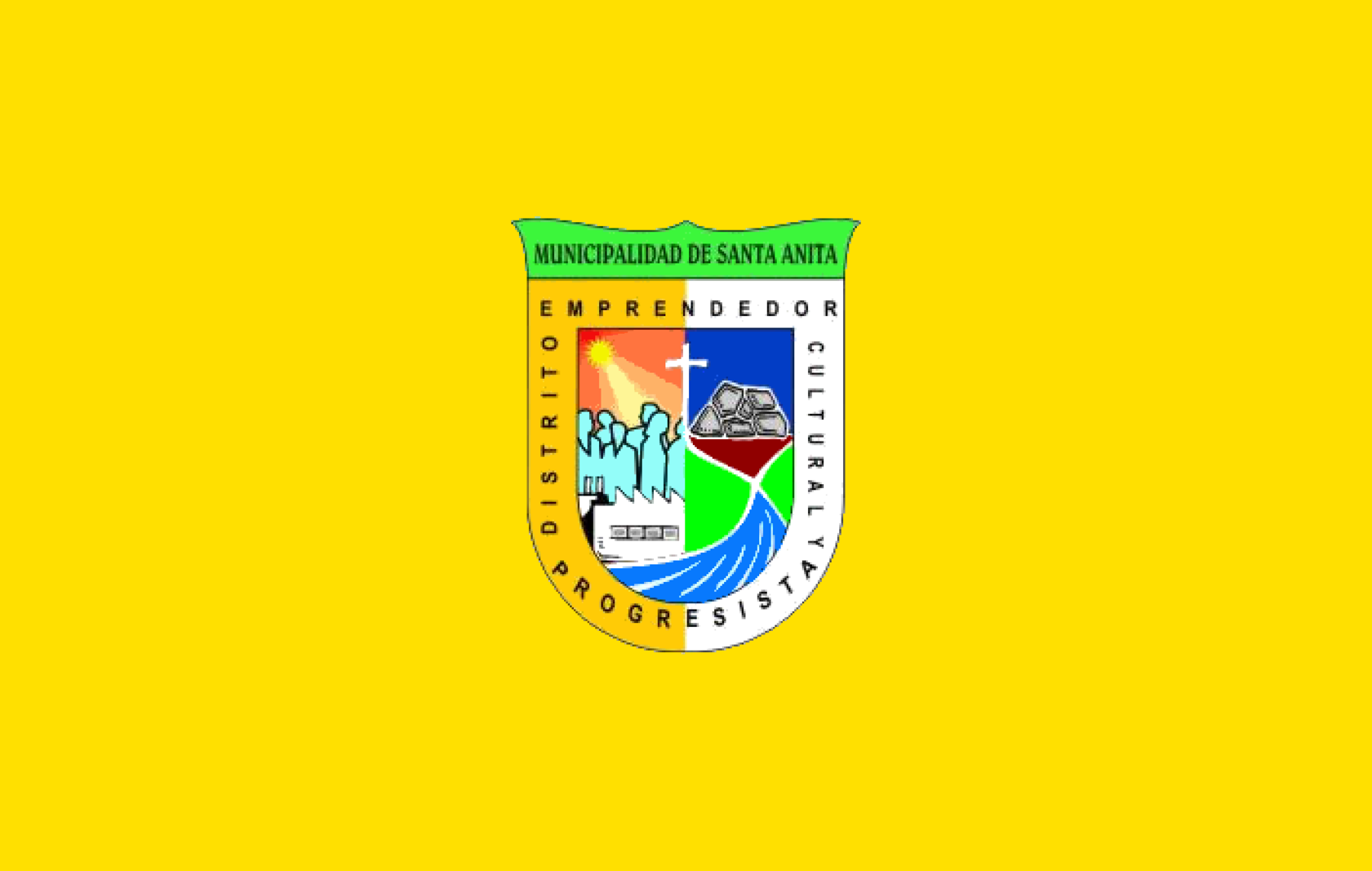
- Flag Coat of arms

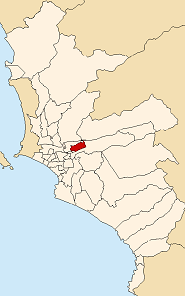
- Location of Santa Anita in the Lima province
- Country: Peru
- Region: Lima
- Province: Lima
- Founded: October 25, 1989
- Capital: Santa Anita
- Subdivisions: 1 populated center

Government
  - Mayor: Olimpio Alegría (2023-2026)

Area
  - Total: 10.69 km^{2} (4.13 sq mi)
- Elevation: 195 m (640 ft)

Population (2023)
  - Total: 232,739}
  - Density: 21,770/km^{2} (56,390/sq mi)
- Time zone: UTC-5 (PET)
- UBIGEO: 150137
- Website: munisantanita.gob.pe

Santa Anita is a district of the Lima Province in Peru. It is part of city of Lima. Officially established as a district on October 25, 1989, from parts of Ate and El Agustino separated by the Rio Surco, a ditch which went all the way to Santiago de Surco.

The current mayor (alcalde) of Santa Anita is Olimpio Alegría Calderón. The district's postal code is 43. The core sections of Santa Anita are: Santa Anita proper, originally a section of Ate; and Los Ficus and Universal, originally sections of El Agustino. Industrial areas to the east of Santa Anita and Universal mark the boundary with Ate.

== Geography ==
The district has a total land area of 10.69 km^{2}. Its administrative center is located 195 meters above sea level.

=== Boundaries ===
- North: El Agustino
- East: Ate
- South: Ate
- West: El Agustino

== Demographics ==
According to a 2002 estimate by the INEI, the district has 154,359 inhabitants and a population density of 14,439.6 inhabitants/km^{2}. In 1999, there were 27,908 households in the district.

== See also ==
- Administrative divisions of Peru
