= Coat of arms of Lima =

- Version used by the Municipality of Lima

Versions
- Version following the heraldic specifications
- Adopted: 1537

The Coat of arms of Lima was granted by the Spanish Crown on December 7, 1537, by Royal Decree signed in Valladolid by Emperor Charles V and his mother Queen Joanna, endowing the city with the shield.

== Description ==
In the Cédula, preserved for a time in the Archives of the Cabildo, and later known by its transcription in another file of the city, the shield is described as follows:

"A shield in blue field, with three crowns of gold of kings, placed in triangle, and on top of them, a gold star, which each of the three points of said star touches the three crowns, and by border some letters of gold that say: 'Hoc signum vere regum est', in red field, and by crest two black eagles of golden crown of kings, that look at each other, and embrace an I and a K, which are the first letters of our proper names, and on top of these said letters a golden star, according to here they are figured and painted."

The slogan on the red border (gules) "Hoc signum vere regum est", which means "This is the true sign of the kings" seems to be related to the founding origin of the Peruvian capital. This tradition is based on the interest of Francisco Pizarro to found the city on the day of the Epiphany, in which the Catholic tradition places the arrival of the three wise men of the East to Bethlehem. However, according to the historian María Rostworowski, such an appellation was not imposed in homage to the Magi but in honor of the Emperor Charles V of the Holy Roman Empire and first of Spain and his mother, Queen Joanna. The main field, of azure, represents the scene: the three open crowns, also called ancient, next to a star of gold, and with the lower tip often elongated. The coat of arms also specifies that the star should touch the crowns with their tips, which enhances the idea of a guide or sign that the star of Bethlehem served the kings. Therefore, as the bordure's own flag indicates, the star is the true sign of the kings.

Outside the shield several figures are placed. On this, are placed the initials "I" and "K", Ioana and Karolus (or Karl), which are the names of the queen Joanna of Castile and her son, later King Charles I of Spain. On the letters a star is placed, and "hugging" them two eagles faced, of sable and crowned, that hold the shield. The eagle is a symbol of the Catholic Monarchs, whose emblem was the Eagle of San Juan. It was used by Joan his daughter, and also by Charles I. The eagle is also an imperial symbol of Charles I, it can be represented in two bodies, or more often, as a double-headed eagle, representing the Holy Roman Empire from which he was his titular. In fact, for a time it was used to represent the shield a double-headed eagle, which was also accompanied by other symbols, such as a lime and the Pillars of Hercules.

== See also ==
- Coat of arms of Peru
- Flag of Lima
- Three Crowns
