= Pucusana District =

District in Lima, Peru

Pucusana
- District
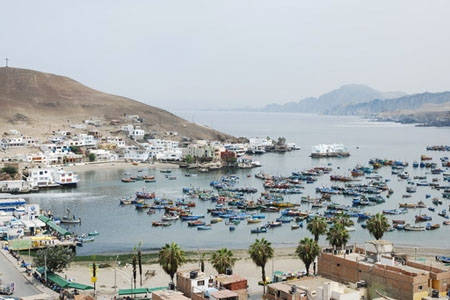
- Pucusana Bay

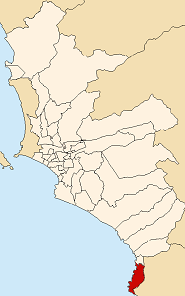
- Location of Pucusana in the Lima province
- Coordinates: 12°25′S 76°47′W
- Country: Peru
- Region: Lima
- Province: Lima
- Founded: January 22, 1943
- Capital: Pucusana
- Subdivisions: 4 populated centers

Government
  - Mayor: Juan Cuya (2023-2026)

Area
  - Total: 37.83 km^{2} (14.61 sq mi)
- Elevation: 15 m (49 ft)

Population (2023)
  - Total: 17,885
  - Density: 472.8/km^{2} (1,224/sq mi)
- Time zone: UTC-5 (PET)
- UBIGEO: 150124
- Website: munipucusana.gob.pe

Pucusana is the southernmost district in Lima Province in Peru.

== Geography ==
It is bordered by the Pacific Ocean on the west and south, the district of Santa María del Mar on the north, the Chilca District of the Cañete Province on the east.

== See also ==
- Administrative divisions of Peru
