= Melitón Carvajal School =

School in Lima, Peru

Coordinates: 12.0845°S 77.0267°W

- Institución Educativa Emblemática Melitón Carvajal

Location
- Leonidas Yerovi 2120, Lince, Lima, Peru

Information
- Type: Public School (I.E.E.)
- Motto: Claridad en la mente, energía en el espíritu y dignidad en la lucha (lit. 'Clarity of mind, energy in spirit and dignity in fight')
- Patron saint: Our Lady of Mount Carmel
- Established: 23 January 1948
- School district: UGEL 03
- Director: Consuelo Elizabeth Soto Meza
- Website: ieemelitoncarvajal.edu.pe

Melitón Carvajal School (Spanish: Institución Educativa Emblemática Melitón Carvajal) is a public school in Lince, Lima, Peru. Established in 1948, it was built over a huaca known as Limatambo (Limac-Tampu). It is named after Vice-Admiral Melitón Carvajal.

== History ==
The institution was founded as a National School by Resolution No. 025 of January 23, 1948. It initially operated in an old house at 1400 Petit Thouars Avenue in Lince District, housing surplus students from the College of Our Lady of Guadalupe. With the establishment of Manuel A. Odría's government in October 1948, a National Education Fund was created to improve and expand national schools, which would become Grand School Units (GUE). The first beneficiary was the National School of Lince, which was relocated to a new, larger campus of 50,184 square metres (540,180 sq ft) in the same district, on land expropriated for this purpose. The cornerstone was laid on July 20, 1949, and the school was finally inaugurated as a GUE on April 15, 1950.

The inauguration was a significant event attended by Odría and his wife, Colonel Juan Mendoza Rodríguez (Minister of Public Education), Dr. Julio Chiriboga Vera (the school's director and theorist of the GUE concept), Mr. Carlos Campodónico (mayor of Lince), members of the diplomatic corps and other personalities. It was the first of the GUEs that were part of a vast construction plan carried out by the government. It was named after Melitón Carvajal, a comrade-in-arms of Miguel Grau and later Minister of War and Navy. His granddaughter, Aurora Carvajal de Cervantes, donated a sword and a hat of his to the building's museum.

Declared an Emblematic Educational Institution in 2009, the school was remodelled and reinaugurated on May 26, 2010, in a ceremony attended by President Alan García and Minister of Education José Antonio Chang. Like many other schools, the incomplete works and irregularities in funding were questioned by the press.

In 2024, pre-Columbian remains dating back to the Ichma period were discovered during the construction of a padel court. Following a request by José Luis Díaz Alcalde, a teacher at the school, the Ministry of Culture notified the school that, should construction works continue, they must be executed under the supervision of an archaeological team.

In 2026, the school saw an outbreak of hand, foot, and mouth disease.

== Directors ==
- Juan Franco López (1948–1950)
- Julio A. Chiriboga Vera (1950–1952)
- Gerasimo García y García (1952–1954)
- Decio Rabanal Cárdenas (1954–1955)
- Emilio Champion de la Cadena (1955–1969)
- Jacinto Mujica Arana (1969–1970)
- Sergio Sánchez Ortiz (1970–1974)
- Rodolfo Charaja Ortega (1974–1976)
- Moisés Aguilar Villanueva (1976–1978)
- David Pareja del Portal (1978–1980)
- Raúl Falcón Garzo (1980–1983)
- Rodolfo Velarde Sánchez (1983–1984)
- Luis Parra Zarate (1984–1986)
- Luis Zambrano Vásquez (1986–1988)
- Odón Bustillos Quijano (1988–1997)
- Antonio Urbina Tirado (1998)
- Luis Florián Atencio (1998–1999)
- Franklin Torres Agreda (March–December 1999)
- Orestes Lizardo Flor (January–February 2000)
- Crisólogo Padilla Díaz (March 2000–?)
- Jhon Tarazona Norabuena (2012–2013)
- Cajahuaman Bravo Renato (2014)
- Soto Meza Consuelo Elizabeth (2015–present)

== Notable alumni ==
- José Antonio Chang, politician
- Luis Cruzado, footballer
- Segundo Galicia Sánchez, professor and sociologist
- Óscar Valdés, businessman and politician
- José Velásquez, footballer

== See also ==
- Emblematic Schools of Peru
- Huaca Huallamarca
- Huaca Pucllana
