= Víctor Chávez =

Víctor Chávez or Victor Chavez may refer to:

- Víctor Raul Díaz Chávez, Peruvian Minister of Education
- Víctor Hugo Rivera Chávez, referee
- Victor Chavez (The Passage), fictional character
- Victor Chavez (businessman), Chief Executive since 2011 of Thales UK
