= SUNEDU =

Government organisation in Peru

National Superintendency of Higher University Education
- Superintendencia Nacional de Educación Superior Universitaria

Agency overview
- Formed: 2014
- Preceding agency: ANR
- Jurisdiction: Peru
- Headquarters: Aldabas 337, Surco
- Agency executive: Manuel Castillo Venegas, Superintendent
- Parent department: Ministry of Education
- Website: www.gob.pe/sunedu

The National Superintendency of Higher University Education (Spanish: Superintendencia Nacional de Educación Superior Universitaria), also known by its acronym SUNEDU, is a government organisation whose purpose is the licensing, quality supervision, and inspection of higher university educational service in Peru.

SUNEDU officially (according to University Law No. 30220) is attached to the Ministry of Education with technical, functional, administrative, economic and financial autonomy. Although according to Law 31520 of 2022, the dependency is annulled because the institution was refounded as an autonomous entity with a legal nature of internal public law.

== History ==
Created in 2014 with the promulgation of University Law No. 30220 (Article 12). Replaces the National Assembly of Rectors (ANR). Prior to its creation, it was called the National Superintendency of the Peruvian University (Spanish: Superintendencia Nacional de la Universidad Peruana), established in Chapter III of the aforementioned law.

SUNEDU became (as of January 5, 2015) responsible for licensing to offer the university higher educational service. In addition, SUNEDU assumes the function of managing the National Registry of Degrees and Titles.

== List of superintendents ==
1. Lorena Masías Quiroga (2015–2017)
2. Flor Luna Victoria Mori (2018)
3. Martín Benavides Abanto (2018–2020)
4. Oswaldo Zegarra Rojas (2020–2023)
5. Manuel Castillo Venegas (2023–present)

== See also ==
- Higher education in Peru
