= Fernando d'Alessio =

Peruvian politician (1944–2026)

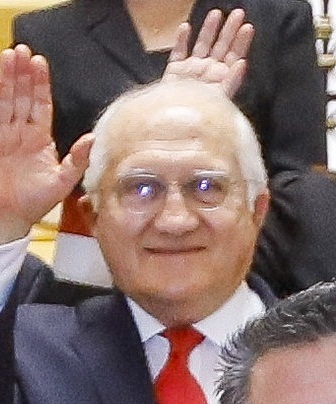
- D'Alessio in 2020

Minister of Education
- In office 12 November 2020 – 17 November 2020
- President: Manuel Merino
- Prime Minister: Ántero Flores Aráoz
- Preceded by: Martín Benavides
- Succeeded by: Ricardo Cuenca

Minister of Health
- In office 17 September 2017 – 9 January 2018
- President: Pedro Pablo Kuczynski
- Prime Minister: Mercedes Aráoz
- Preceded by: Patricia J. García
- Succeeded by: Abel Salinas Rivas

Personal details
- Born: Fernando Antonio d'Alessio Ipinza; 25 March 1944 Lima, Peru
- Died: 2 August 2026 (aged 82) Lima, Peru
- Party: Independent
- Education: Peruvian Naval School (BS); Salve Regina University (MBA); University of Phoenix (DBA)
- Occupation: University administrator

Fernando Antonio d'Alessio Ipinza (25 March 1944 – 2 August 2026) was a Peruvian politician. An independent, he served as minister of health from 2017 to 2018 and served as Minister of Education for five days in November 2020.

D'Alessio died in Lima on 2 August 2026, at the age of 82.
