= Huaca Huallamarca =

Archaeological site in Lima, Peru

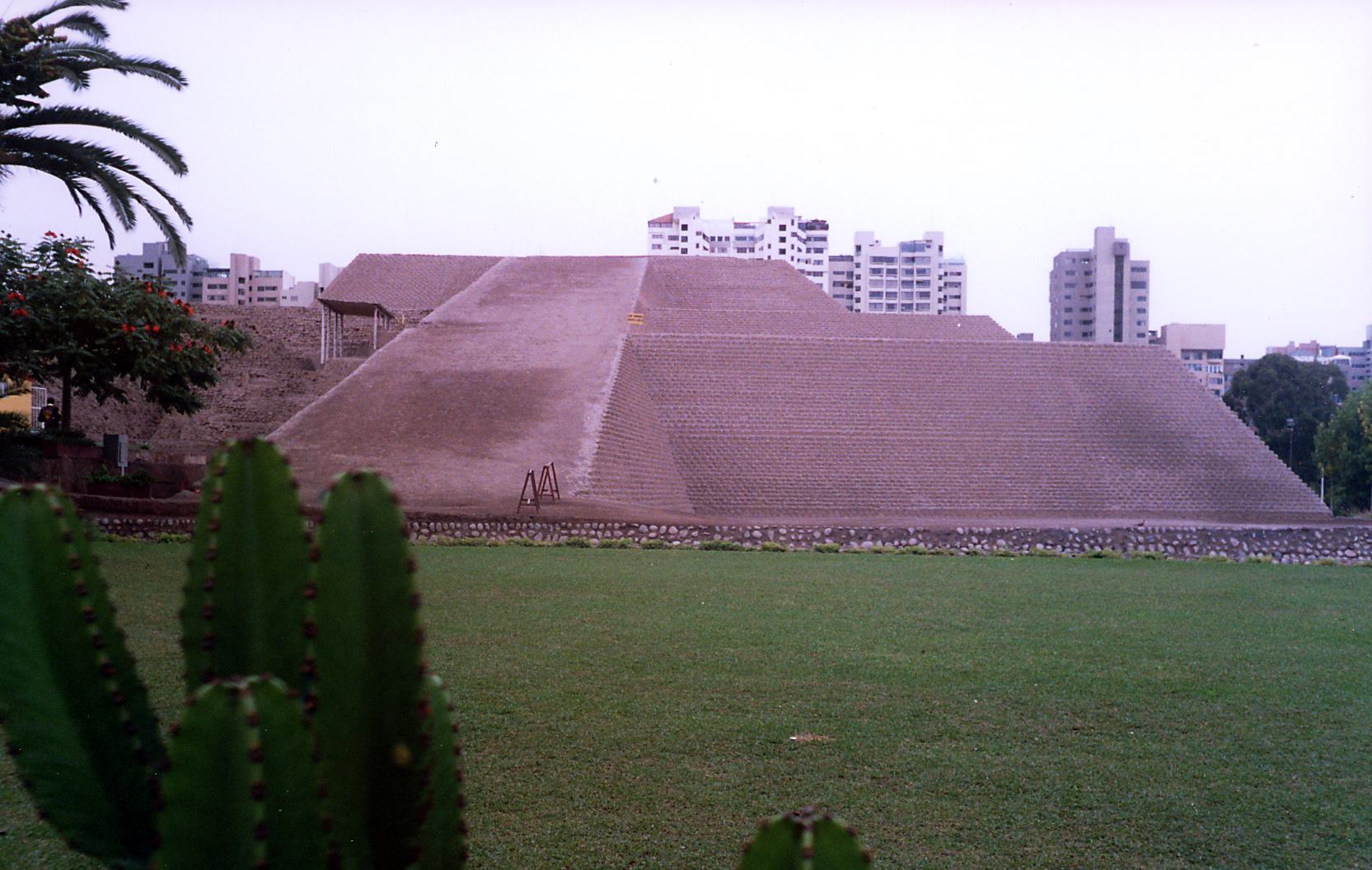
- Partial view of Huaca Huallamarca

- Location within Peru
- 12.0974°S 77.0405°W
- Type: Temple
- Periods: Lima, Ychsma, Inca
- Cultures: Lima, Ychsma
- Location: San Isidro, Lima, Peru

Site notes
- Archaeologists: Julio C. Tello, Jorge Zegarra

Huaca Huallamarca (possibly from Quechua wak'a, Spanishified as "huaca" and meaning "sacred" or "local god of protection"; Walla, the name of the Huallas tribe; and marka, "village", "town" or "region"), also formerly known as Huaca Pan de Azúcar (from Spanish pan de azúcar, "sugar loaf"), is an archaeological site located in the district of San Isidro, in the city of Lima, the capital of Peru.

It has the form of a truncated stepped pyramid, consisting of three levels with an approximate height of 19 metres. Today, it is one of the few huacas preserved in that area.

== History ==
In 1873, Thomas Hutchinson, a businessman interested in culture, published his book Two years in Peru: with exploration of its antiquities. He, together with other scholars such as Antonio Raimondi, had already recognised the Huaca Huallamarca site as distinctive and important, and Hutchinson carried out explorations with scientific aims. In his account of the architectural site he described a stepped building with three levels, recording its measurements, altitude, characteristics of local flora and fauna, the climate and its fluctuations, and highlighting the recovery of funerary objects such as human remains, textiles, ceramics, etc.

The first archaeological excavations were carried out in 1942 and were directed by Julio C. Tello, who stated that Huaca Huallamarca's boundaries were marked by the Huatica and Surco canals, the latter so large and powerful that it is called a river.

Tello also identified three main moments of occupation: from the beginning of the Lima culture period (2nd century BCE to 7th century AD), through the Yshma (11th century AD), to the Inca period (15th–16th centuries AD). The construction of the Huallamarca pyramid began with the Huallas from 200 BC to AD 200. They placed platforms one on top of another to achieve different levels on which buildings, rooms and corridors were erected. They used it as a ceremonial centre, so this is considered the first phase of the huaca. It was later abandoned and reused, known as the second phase, in which it was used as a cemetery from AD 900 to AD 1300 by the Lima, Yschma, and Chancay cultures. The third phase occurred during the Inca period, from AD 1400 to AD 1532, when the huaca was used as a public building, as food, textiles and large vessels were found.

In the early decades of the 20th century the site was severely affected by being used as a quarry for extracting construction material. This caused a large depression which was covered with the modern ramp visible directly from the front of the site. In the 1920s a large cut was made into its flanks to enable a road to the summit, which was levelled. In 1941 the Municipality of San Isidro began its demolition, which was halted due to the intervention of the National Archaeology Board.

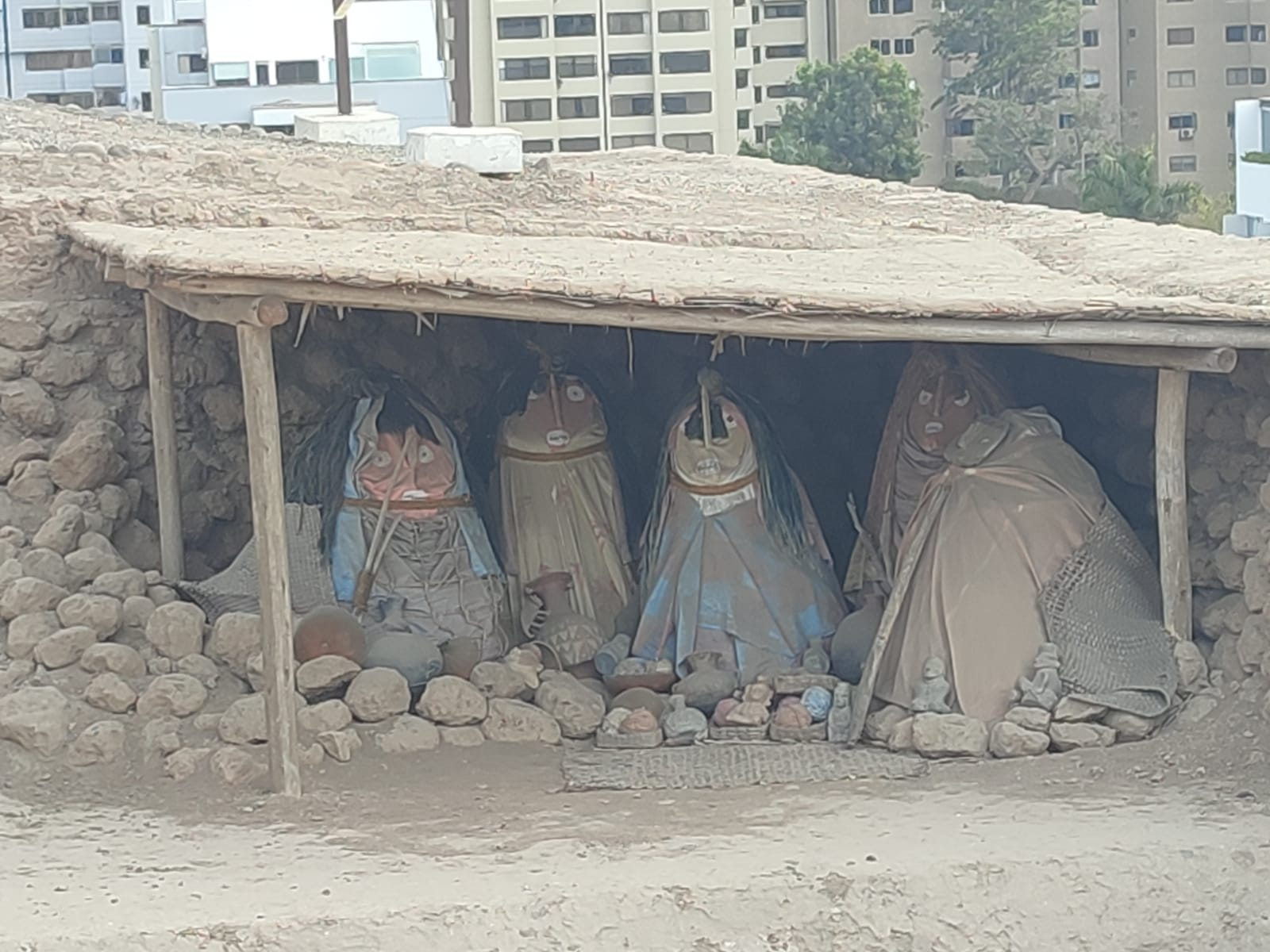
Funerary bundles at Huaca Huallamarca.

Between 1991 and 1992, three seasons of archaeological excavations were carried out under the direction of Lic. Clide Valladolid, within the framework of the Research, Conservation and Enhancement Agreement for the Site between the Municipality of San Isidro, the Museum of the Nation and the National Institute of Culture. Later, between October 1997 and August 1998, excavations were carried out on the southwest side of the pyramid to secure the future renovation of the museum.

== Description ==
Archaeologist Julio C. Tello described Huallamarca as a structure built exclusively with small handmade adobes in the shape of molars or irregular cones. He noted that at the archaeological site there are no remains of rectangular adobes or large adobe blocks, which are the types used in neighbouring archaeological sites of San Isidro and others in the Lima Valley. In his survey, Tello observed that at the top of the site there were numerous tombs, attributing them to the late periods and comparing them to the tombs of the archaeological site Huaca Malena, located in the Asia Valley. When it was used by the Incas, only the kuraka (chief or magistrate) was allowed to reach the upper area; the clergy had small houses in the middle and the common people were below. This arrangement was explained by the belief that the higher one was, the closer one was to the gods, the Moon and the Sun.

Thanks to earlier records of the site, such as that of Thomas Hutchinson, we know that the building had a large stepped platform with two levels.

== Restoration ==
In the 19th century Huaca Huallamarca was visited by numerous travellers, since it was famous for its burials, rich in ceramic and metal objects. According to old references, it measured 125 meters long by 76 meters wide, and its shape was conical, which is why it was called Pan de Azúcar ("Sugar Loaf").

In the 1950s the Ministry of Development and Public Works authorised its demolition to build a public park in its place, but when this did not proceed, the Casa de la Cultura del Perú began the revaluation and reconstruction of the pyramid, sponsored by Carlos Neuhaus Rizo Patrón, then mayor of the district. The reconstruction of Huaca Huallamarca began in 1958 through the initiative of Carlos Neuhaus, mayor at that time, who ordered excavation work at the site, leading to the discovery of important remains. The process ended in 1960 with the creation of the present Huaca Huallamarca Site Museum housing the remains recovered at the site.

== Ceramics ==
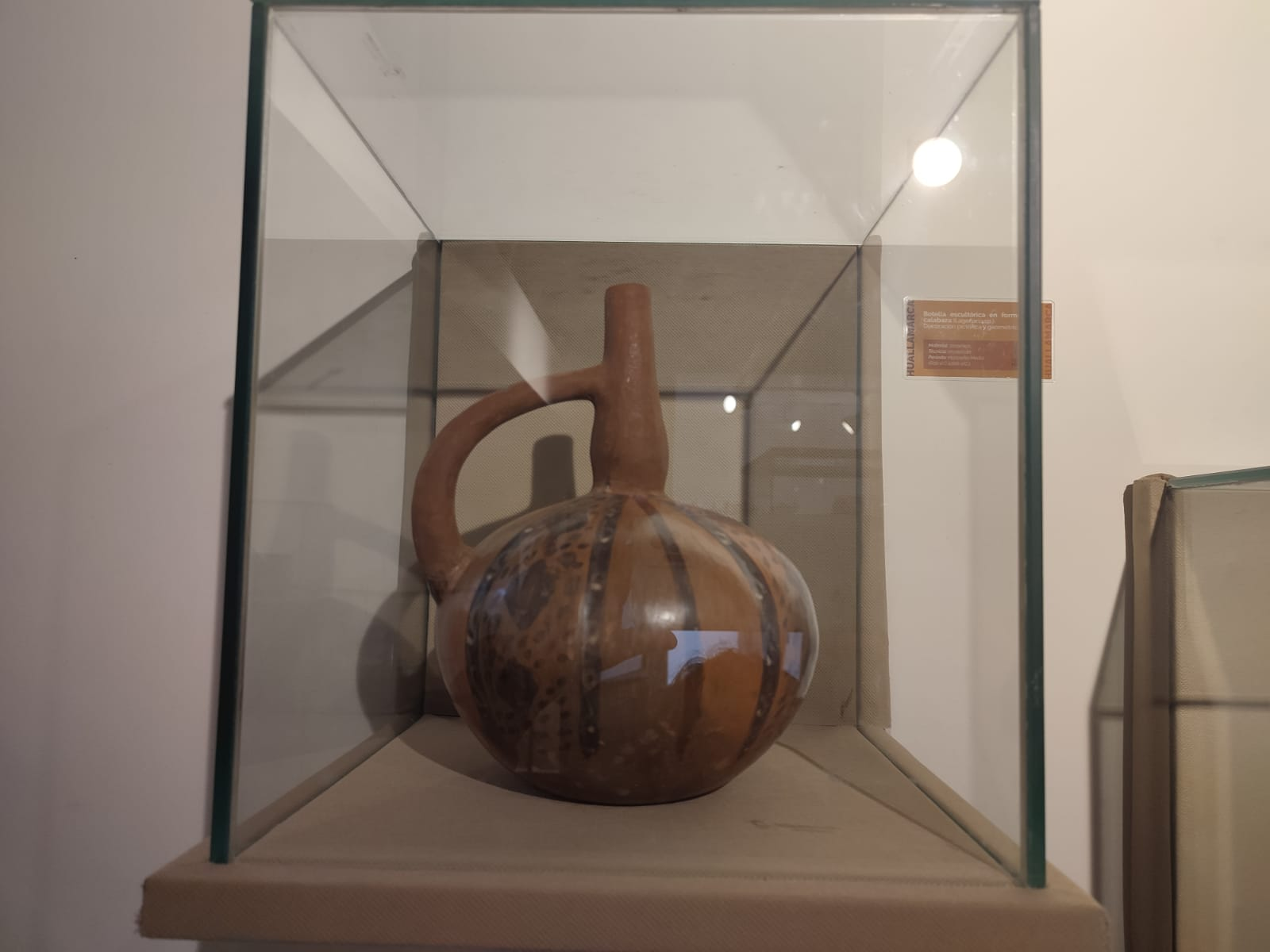
Sculptural bottle.

There is evidence from the late Middle Horizon (AD 900), corresponding to the initial stage of the Ychsma culture with Wari influence in its funerary bundles and with jars made using modelling techniques, polychrome in cream and orange-reddish tones with triangular vertical band designs. Ceramics from the Late Intermediate Period (AD 1000–1100) with the early identity phase of the Ychsma culture have also been found, where its consolidation in funerary assemblages can be observed.

== Daily life and diet ==
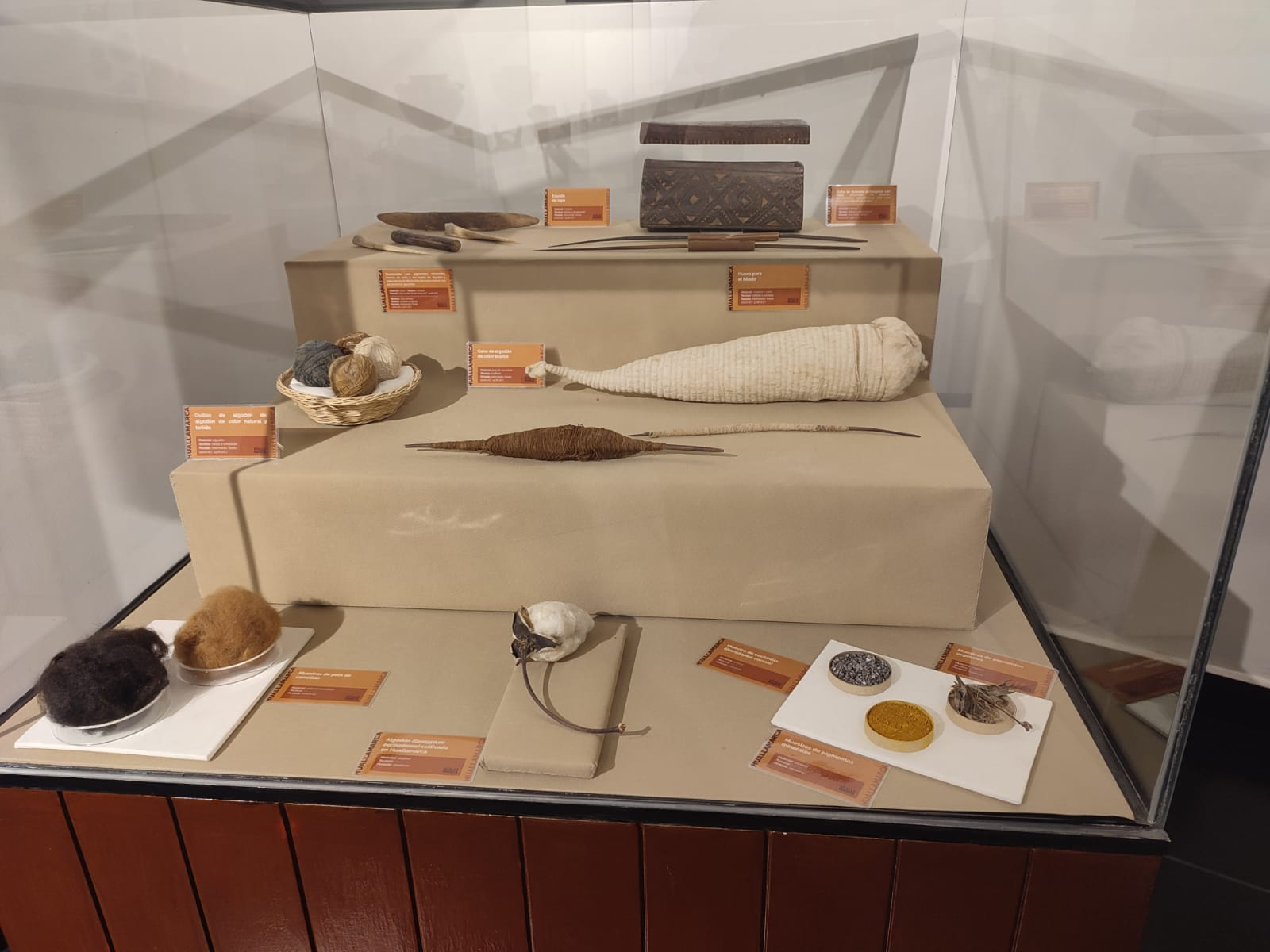
Textile material exhibited in the Huallamarca Site Museum.

The building brought together and organised a sector of the population of the lower Rímac Valley for ceremonial, administrative, political and social purposes. The objects found accompanying the burials discovered at Huallamarca allow us to form an idea of the daily life of the ancient inhabitants of present-day San Isidro district. All evidence indicates that this population, organized in families, developed an industrious life; there are no signs of human sacrifice, nor have weapons been found. Instead, numerous farming tools have been discovered, pieces of cotton weaving, sewing baskets full of spinning tools, decorated gourds used as tableware, ceramic vessels, children's toys and musical instruments.

Likewise, archaeological evidence in funerary contexts provides information about their diet, which came from both sea and land and was largely based on species such as the choro, freshwater snail, limpet, shrimp, etc. However, as the population increased, needs also grew, and cultivation of maize, bean, pallar, chilli pepper and others intensified; likewise the consumption of meat from guinea pigs, camelids, birds, fish, and shellfish.

== See also ==
- Tourism in Peru
- San Isidro District, Lima

== Bibliography ==
- Barriga, P. Víctor M.: 1933, Los Mercedarios en el Perú en el siglo XVI. Documentos inéditos del Archivo General de Indias
- Cornejo Guerrero, Miguel A.: 2004, Pachacamac y el canal de Guatca en el bajo Rimac. In: Bull. Inst. Fr. Etudes Andines, 33 (3), pp. 783–814, Lima.
- Dolorier, Camilo & Lydia Casas Salazar: 2008, "Caracterización de algunos estilos locales de la costa central a inicios del Intermedio Tardío". In: Arqueología y Sociedad 19: 23–42. Museo de Arqueología y Antropología de la Universidad Nacional Mayor de San Marcos.
- Hopkins, B. Aranzazu: 2019, Análisis artístico metodológico como instrumento de investigación para la restauración en el Perú
- Hutchinson, T.: 1873, Two years in Peru: with exploration of its antiquities. Londres: Sampson Low, Marston, Low and Searle.
- Ravines, Rogger: 1985, Inventario de Monumentos Arqueológicos del Perú (Lima Metropolitana). Primera aproximación. INC-Municipalidad de Lima Metropolitana.
- Tello, Julio C.: 1999, Cuadernos de Investigación del Archivo Tello Nº 1. Arqueología del Valle de Lima. Museo de Arqueología y Antropología de la Universidad Nacional Mayor de San Marcos.
- Valladolid, Clyde: 1992, "Huallamarca". En: Pachacámac. Revista del Museo de la Nación. Volume I. Tome I: 133–134, Lima.
- Zegarra G., Jorge: 1958, Trabajos de restauración, limpieza y rescate de especímenes arqueológicos en la Huaca Pan de Azúcar o Huallamarca, Tomes I & II.

== See also ==
- San Isidro District, Lima
