= Melitón Carvajal =

Peruvian naval commander and government official

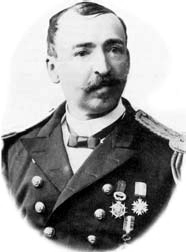
Melitón Carvajal

Manuel Melitón Carvajal Ambulodegui (March 10, 1847, in Lima – September 19, 1935, in Lima), was a Peruvian naval commander and government official who was part of the crew of the ironclad Huáscar during the War of the Pacific. He was wounded and taken prisoner at the Battle of Angamos and became a national hero. He later held numerous government posts and supervised the buildup of the Peruvian Navy. Melitón Carvajal National College, located in Lince District, was named in his honor.

== Early career ==
He was the son of a Colombian doctor, Manuel Ignacio Carvajal, and his wife María del Pilar Ambulodegui. He studied at the College of Our Lady of Guadalupe in Lima, and entered the Naval College in 1860, where he graduated as an Officer Cadet in 1863. He remained there as a professor of arithmetic and geography and, the following year, he was awarded the rank of Ensign. He joined Colonel Mariano Ignacio Prado's coup and fought at the Battle of Callao, after which he was promoted to First Lieutenant.

Beginning in 1867, he served as Captain of the Port in several locations and explored the Marañón and Huallaga rivers on board the gunboat Napo, conquering the treacherous Pongo de Manseriche. In 1872, he was one of the officers on board the frigate Apurímac, when the naval commanders signed a manifesto declaring their opposition to the coup led by Tomás Gutiérrez. During a term as Sub-director of the Naval College, he served on a commission to measure the depth of guano deposits along the coast (1875-1876).

== War of the Pacific ==
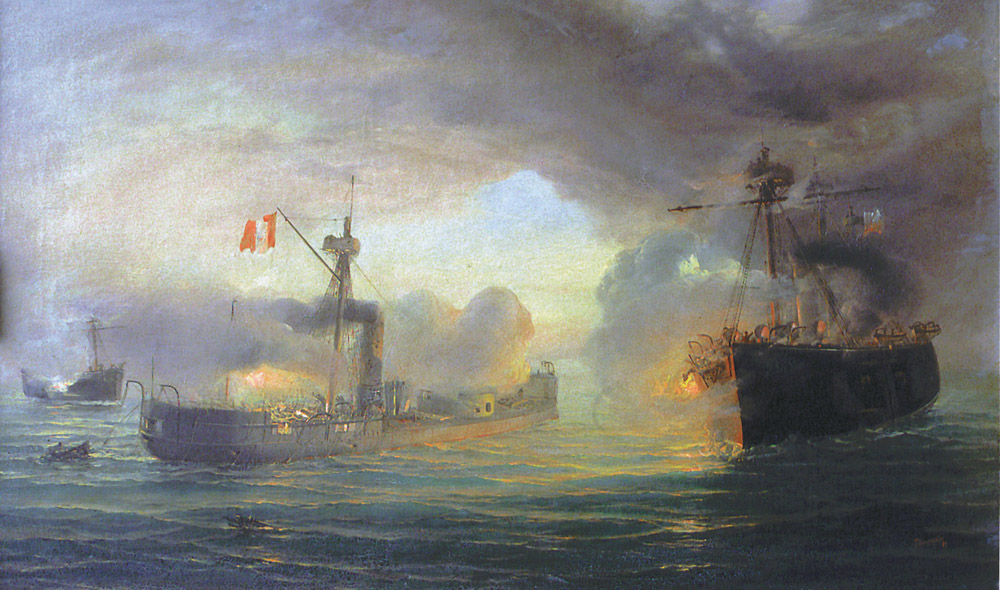
The Battle of Angamos

At the outbreak of the War of the Pacific in 1879, he was a Frigate Captain. He embarked on the ironclad Huáscar as Chief-of-Staff for the First Naval Division. He was present at all the battles fought by that vessel, under the command of Admiral Grau, including the Battle of Angamos, where he was wounded by an exploding grenade in the control tower. Because of this, he was unable to take command of the Huáscar after the deaths of Admiral Grau and his second-in-command, Captain Elias Aguirre Romero. Carvajal was taken prisoner and obtained his release through an exchange. He was hailed as a hero throughout Peru.

== Later career ==
In 1880, he was commissioned to visit Europe to obtain arms and supervise the construction of the gunboats Lima and Callao in England and, in 1883, was elected for congress representing Andahuaylas, becoming part of the Congress that gathered in Arequipa, the seat of Admiral Lizardo Montero's government.

In 1890, he headed the mission that went to Valparaíso to repatriate the remains of the Peruvians who had died there during the war. Towards the end of the Remigio Morales Bermúdez administration, he was named Minister of Finance and Commerce, a position he held until Morales' death in 1894. Following the Pierolista coup he was placed on trial, but the case was dismissed.

He was Director of the Military Preparatory School (1897-1898), Prefect of Junín Province (1899), Director of the Military Academy (1900) and the Minister of War (1900). He was promoted to Admiral in 1901. Later, he was named President of the Navy's Board of Governors (1902). He made a trip to Europe (his fourth) to supervise construction of the cruisers Almirante Grau and Coronel Bolognesi in the English shipyards, and personally commanded their maiden voyages to Peru in 1907.

In 1913, he was named Admiral of the Fleet and served another term as Minister of War (1913-1914). He became the Second Vice President of Peru during the second term of President José Pardo (1915-1919). He retired in 1927, after almost sixty years of public service.

== See also ==
- Melitón Carvajal School
