= Cajamarquilla =

Archaeological site in Peru

Coordinates: 11°59′07″S 76°54′38″W

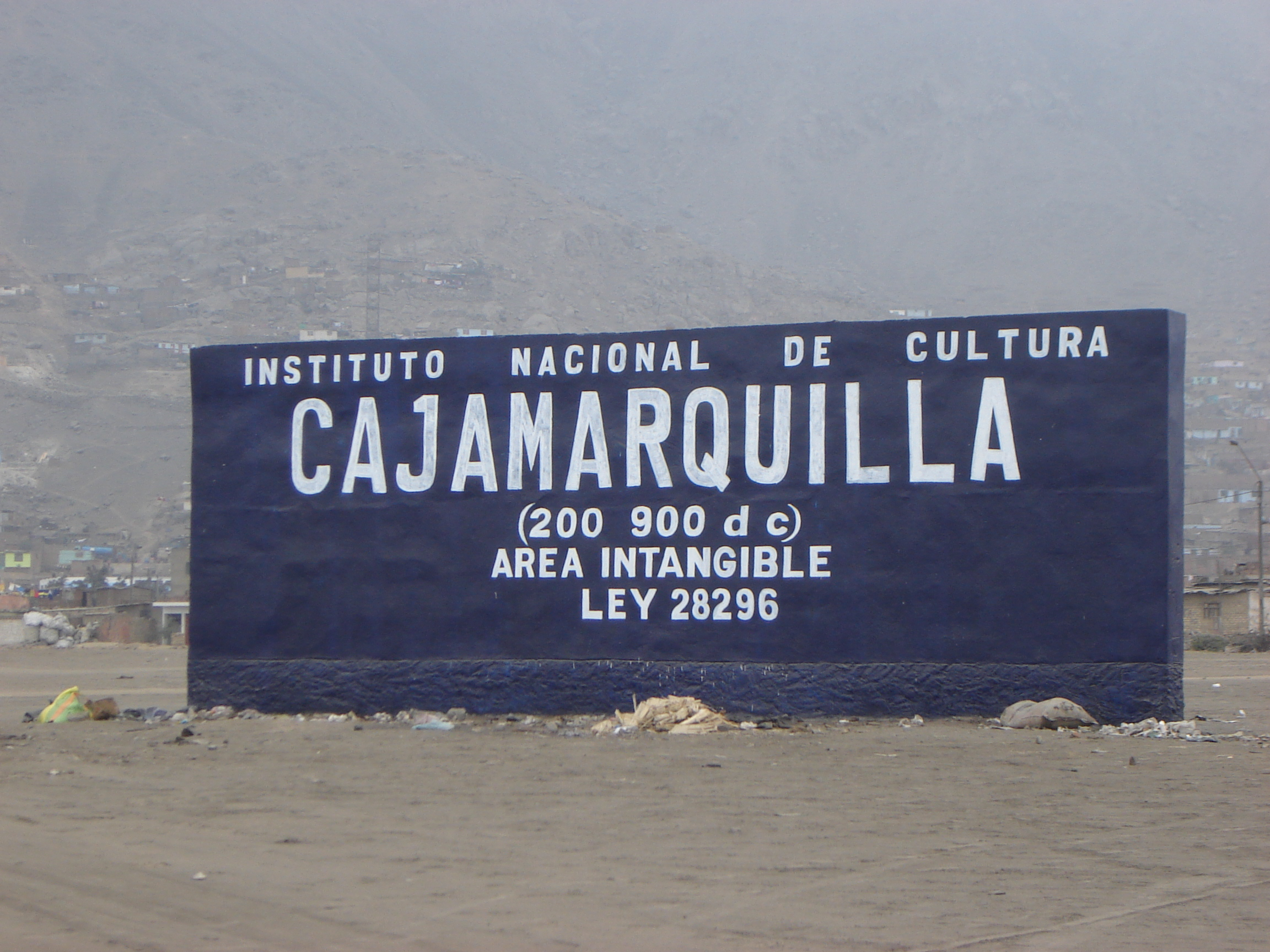
INC (National Institute of Culture) sign at Cajamarquilla archaeological site

The Cajamarquilla archaeological site is located 25 km inland from the coastal city of Lima, Peru; in the Jicamarca Valley, 6 km north of the Rímac River. It occupies an area of approximately 167 ha, making it one of the largest archaeological monuments in the country. The site itself is now surrounded by several small villages which are encroaching upon, and threatening, its largely unfenced perimeter - despite its nationally 'protected' status.

Cajamarquilla is an 'adobe' city, which served as an important trading center during the height of the Lima culture. It was occupied throughout the first millennium of the current era, but climate change and natural disasters (e.g. earthquakes) eventually led to its abandonment several hundred years before the Spanish conquest. Situated in a then fertile valley on a major trade route between the 'altiplano' region of the high Andes and the coastal communities of the Pacific coast, Cajamarquilla became a sophisticated center for culture, religion, and commerce. At the site, it is possible to observe the remains of temple-pyramids, wide streets, ceremonial squares, cemeteries, underground grain silos, canals, and numerous other enclosures and buildings; many of unidentified use — all constructed using 'tapial' methods (i.e. mud brick and plaster).

A mummy that is approximately 800 years old that is believed to be of pre inca cultures was found on the site in November 2021 by a team of archeologists of the National University of San Marcos. Researchers reported that the mummy was tied with strings, covering his face with his hands, so they assumed it was a southern Peruvian funeral custom. In February 2022, archaeologists announced the discovery of six mummified children thought to have been sacrificed, probably to accompany a dead elite man to the afterlife. According to archaeologist Pieter Van Dalen, 1,000-1,200 years old mummies were probably relatives and placed one above the other in different parts of the tomb.
