= José Antonio Chang =

Peruvian politician

José Antonio Chang OSP
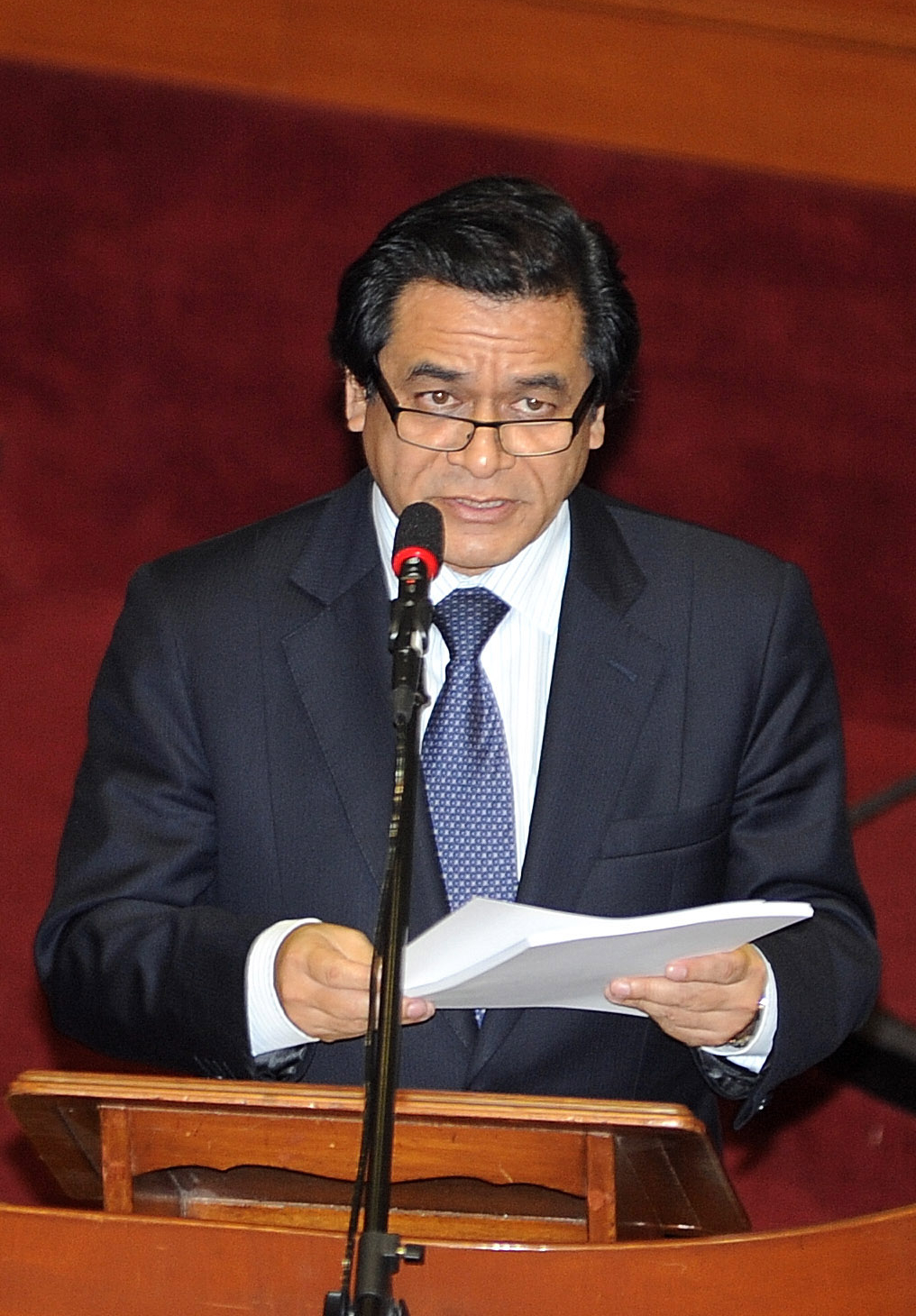
- Chang in 2010

Prime Minister of Peru
- In office 14 September 2010 – 18 March 2011
- President: Alan García
- Preceded by: Javier Velásquez
- Succeeded by: Rosario Fernández

Minister of Education
- Incumbent
- Assumed office 28 July 2026
- President: Keiko Fujimori
- Prime Minister: Luis Galarreta
- Preceded by: Jorge Marticorena Mendoza
- In office 28 July 2006 – 18 March 2011
- President: Alan García
- Prime Minister: Jorge Del Castillo; Yehude Simon; Javier Velásquez; Himself
- Preceded by: Javier Sota Nadal
- Succeeded by: Víctor Raúl Díaz Chávez

Rector of the University of San Martín de Porres
- Incumbent
- Assumed office 23 April 2011
- Preceded by: Raúl Eduardo Bao García

Personal details
- Born: José Antonio Chang Escobedo; 19 May 1958 (age 68) Lima, Peru
- Party: APRA
- Education: Federico Villarreal National University; University of Hartford
- Occupation: Engineer • Professor • Politician
- Awards: Order of the Sun of Peru (2011)

José Antonio Chang Escobedo (born 19 May 1958) is a Peruvian politician who was the Prime Minister of Peru from 2010 to 2011, appointed by President Alan García. Chang replaced Javier Velásquez as part of a cabinet reshuffle. He was also Minister of Education until he resigned both cabinet positions on March 18, 2011. He current serves as Minister of Education again under Keiko Fujimori since July 2026. Chang was the second Chinese-Peruvian Prime Minister, the first being Víctor Joy Way in 1999 during the administration of President Alberto Fujimori. He currently serves as a Rector of the University of San Martín de Porres. He is the subject of numerous judicial investigations.

== Education ==
Chang Escobedo studied in Lima, at Melitón Carvajal School. He entered and graduated from the Federico Villarreal National University with a degree in industrial engineering, and obtained a Master of Education degree in the specialty of Educational Computing and Technology from the University of Hartford, Connecticut, in the United States of America. He has also studied Administration and Organization at ESAN.

== University of San Martín de Porres ==
José Antonio Chang Escobedo was the first dean of the Faculty of Computer Engineering and Systems of the University of San Martín de Porres, considering him the manager of the transformation of said faculty and later of the university of which he was rector from 1996, until he requested leave in 2006 to occupy the position of Minister of Education. During his tenure, the USMP began an infrastructure renovation program that has allowed it to have modern campuses equipped with state-of-the-art technology in all its specialties. In 2001, an investigative sub-commission of the Congress of the Republic that analyzed the complaints of irregularities in said university, recommended that they be renewed to the authorities. Since then, 14 years have passed and José Antonio Chang continues to lead the San Martín University, which in 2012 reported total income of S / .372 million. On the other hand, under his leadership, international accreditation processes were initiated in all the university's faculties and schools, which has allowed 16 professional careers, 31 master's degrees and 6 doctorates offered by the university to have international accreditations at the beginning of 2012. He was re-elected for the third time as rector of said house of studies in 2011. Previously: 1996, 2001, 2006, and lately, 2011.

Political offices
Preceded by Javier Velásquez	Prime Minister of Peru; 2010–2011	Succeeded by Rosario Fernández
