= Víctor Raul Díaz Chávez =

Peruvian politician and writer

Víctor Raul Díaz Chávez served as the Peruvian Minister of Education under President Alan García from 19 March 2011 to 28 July 2011.

Political offices
| Preceded by Jose Antonio Chang Escobedo | Minister of Education; 2011 | Succeeded by Patricia Salas |
