= Thomas Joseph Hutchinson =

Irish surgeon and explorer (1820–1885)

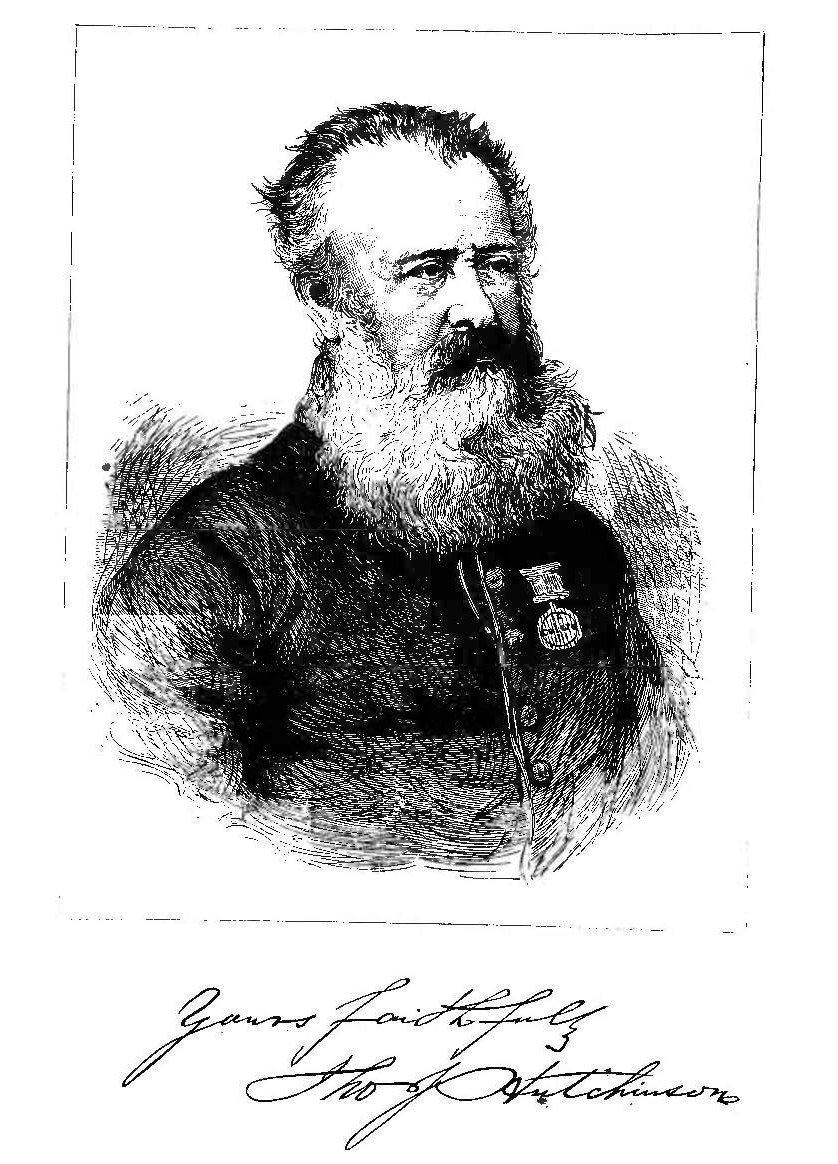
Thomas Joseph Hutchinson

Thomas Joseph Hutchinson (1820–1885) was an Anglo-Irish explorer and writer. Born in January, 1820, in Stonyford, County Kilkenny, Ireland, he reportedly studied medicine in Germany. After a trip to West Africa in 1851, he became chief surgeon on the Niger expedition (1854–1855). After two years as English Consul at the Bight of Biafra and Fernando Po, he became governor of the latter place (1857) and in 1861 was transferred to the consulate at Rosario in Argentina, where he took part in the Salado expedition of 1862. In 1870 he was appointed Consul at Callao and three years later retired to his Irish home. He later traveled through Europe during the 1870s, and published several books. He died in Florence, Italy in March, 1885.

== Works ==
Hutchinson wrote the following:

- Narrative of the Niger Tshadda Binuë Exploration (1855)
- Impressions of Western Africa (1858)
- Ten Years' Wandering among the Ethiopians (1861)
- Buenos Ayres and Argentine Gleanings (1865)
- Parana and South American Recollections (1868)
- Two Years in Peru (1873)
- Summer Rambles in Brittany (1876)
