= Ministry of Education (Peru) =

Government ministry of Peru

- Ministerio de Educación

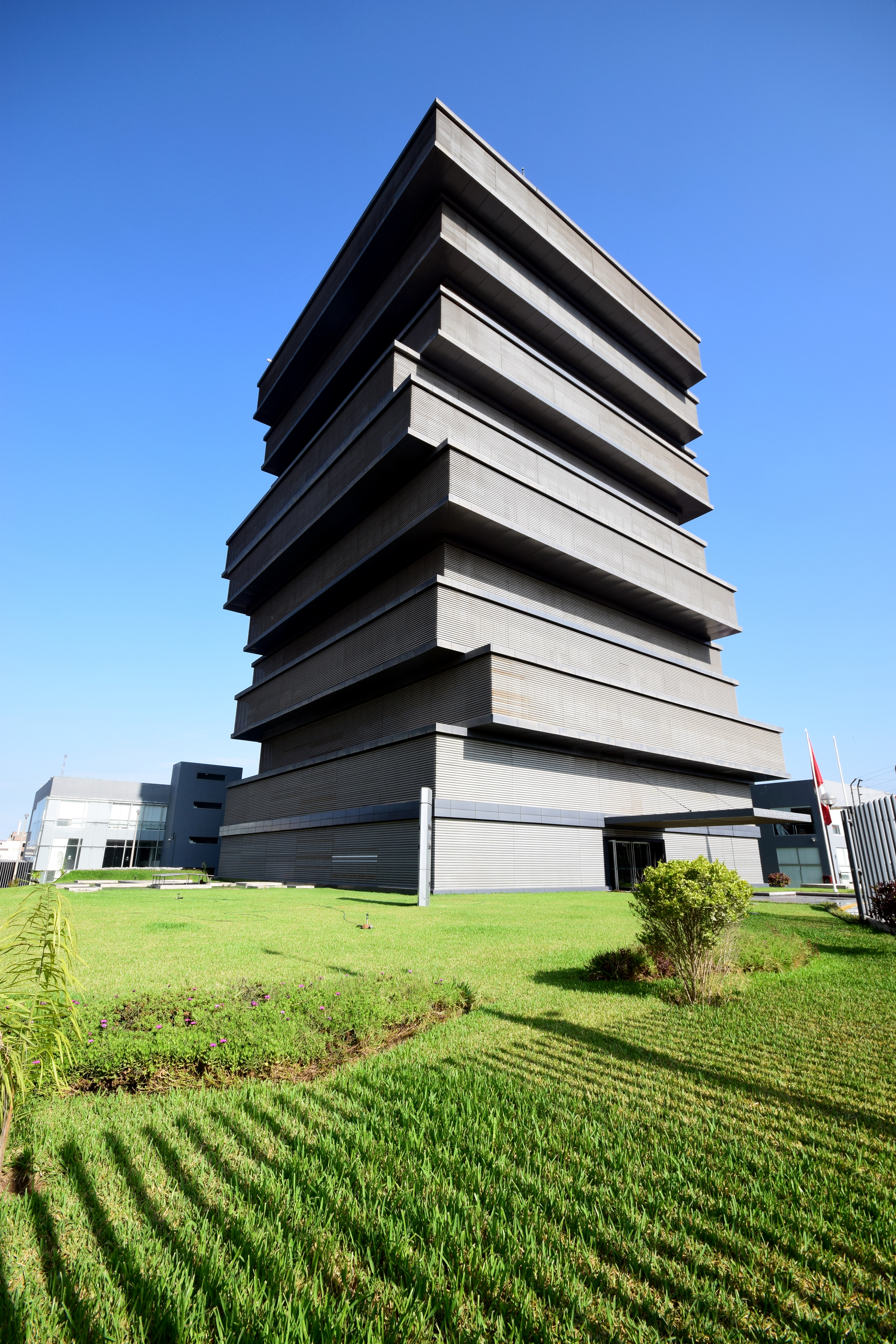
- Headquarters in Lima

Ministry overview
- Formed: February 4, 1837
- Jurisdiction: Government of Peru
- Headquarters: San Borja, Lima, Peru
- Minister responsible: Magnet Márquez Ramírez
- Website: www.gob.pe/minedu

The Ministry of Education (Spanish: Ministerio de Educación, MINEDU) is the government ministry responsible for education in Peru.

== History ==
At the beginning of an independent Peru, the Education branch was known as that of "Public Instruction", and was part of a multi-pronged ministry that included the sectors of Justice, Worship (or Ecclesiastical Affairs), and Charity. On one occasion, it was combined with the Office of Foreign Affairs.

Its first predecessor was the Ministry of Public Instruction, Charity, and Ecclesiastical Affairs (Spanish: Ministerio de Instrucción Pública, Beneficencia y Negocios Eclesiásticos), created on February 4, 1837, during the administration of Andrés de Santa Cruz, president of the Peru–Bolivian Confederation. This office was the fourth ministry, along with the three traditional ministries founded in 1822: Government and Foreign Affairs, War and Navy, and Economy.

The following day, February 5, 1837, the priest Dr. Manuel Villarán Loli was appointed the first Minister of Public Instruction. After the fall of the Confederation and the beginning of the Restoration period in 1839, this ministry was restored, albeit briefly. After the anarchy that broke out in 1842, a General Ministry was established; once constitutionality was restored in 1845, the various branches of government were reorganised.

In 1852, the Ministry of Justice, Ecclesiastical Affairs, Education, and Charity (Spanish: Ministerio de Justicia, Negocios Eclesiásticos, Instrucción y Beneficencia) was created, whose first head was the cleric Bartolomé Herrera, a conservative ideologue. From 1855 to 1856, the branch of Public Education was merged with the Foreign Office, thus functioning as the Ministry of Foreign Affairs and Public Education (Spanish: Ministerio de Relaciones Exteriores e Instrucción Pública).

By law of November 17, 1856, issued under the provisional government of Ramón Castilla, the Ministry of Justice, Education, and Charity (Spanish: Ministerio de Justicia, Instrucción y Beneficencia) was created. An amendment to this law in 1862 included this ministry in the branch of worship. The Ministry of Justice, Worship, Charity, and Public Instruction (Spanish: Ministerio de Justicia, Culto, Beneficencia e Instrucción Pública) was thus established. In 1896, it ceased to include the branch of charity and was renamed the Ministry of Justice, Worship, and Education (Spanish: Ministerio de Justicia, Culto e Instrucción).

On September 12, 1935, Law No. 8124, passed during the administration of General Óscar R. Benavides, created the Ministry of Public Education (Spanish: Ministerio de Educación Pública), which was thus definitively separated from the Ministry of Justice and Worship. The first to hold the title of Minister of Public Education was General Ernesto Montagne Markholz (1935-1939). In 1965, it was renamed to its current name, and in 2007 its acronym changed from MED to MINEDU.

=== Headquarters ===
From 1956 until the mid-1990s, its main headquarters were in the Javier Alzamora Valdez Building, a skyscraper located in the Historic Centre of Lima.

In the mid-90s, it moved to a new headquarters where the Institute for Research and Development of Education (INIDE) operated, located in the San Borja District until 2011, when a new building was inaugurated to the north of the San Borja District, next to the Museum of the Nation. Previously, at the end of the 2000s, some offices moved to the Administrative Complex of the Public Fisheries Sector to later move to the new headquarters in the form of stacked books. Finally, all the administrative areas of the ministry were transferred to the new headquarters where the ministry works to this day.

== Organisation ==
The ministry's current organisation dates back to Supreme Decree 001-2015-MINEDU, approved in 2015.

- Ministerial Office
  - Vice Ministry of Pedagogical Management
    - General Directorate of Regular Basic Education
    - General Directorate of Alternative, Intercultural, Bilingual, and Rural Education Services
    - General Directorate of Special Educational Services
    - Directorate of Technological Innovation in Education
    - Directorate of Educational Resources Management
    - General Directorate of Teacher Development
    - General Directorate of Higher University Education
    - General Directorate of Technical-Productive and Higher Technological and Artistic Education
    - House of Peruvian Literature
  - Vice Ministry of Institutional Management
    - General Directorate of Decentralized Management
    - General Directorate of School Management Quality
    - General Directorate of Educational Infrastructure
    - General Directorate of Scholarships and Educational Loans
    - National Scholarship and Educational Loan Programme (PRONABEC)
    - National Educational Infrastructure Programme (PRONIED)
  - General Secretariat
  - Secretariat of Strategic Planning
- Institutional Oversight Body
- Public Prosecutor's Office
- National Education Council
- Metropolitan Lima Regional Directorate (DRELM)

Entities administered by the ministry include:

- Peruvian Institute of Sport (IPD)
- National System for Evaluation, Accreditation and Certification of Educational Quality (SINEACE)
- National Youth Secretariat (SENAJU)

Huampani Vacation Center (CV HUAMPANI) High-Performance Schools (COAR) Special Public Investment Project for Bicentennial Schools (PEIP for Bicentennial Schools) Educational Resources Management Directorate (DIGERE) National Fund for the Development of Peruvian Education (FONDEP) National Literacy Programme (PNA) Programme for the Improvement of the Quality and Relevance of Higher University and Technological Education Services (PMESUT) Management Agency for Public Higher Technological Education Institutes and Schools (Educatec)

Related entities include:

- National Superintendency of Higher University Education (SUNEDU)
- National Pedagogical Institute of Monterrico (IPNM)
- National Autonomous School of Fine Arts of Peru (ENSABAP)
- National School of Ballet (ENSB)
- Public Universities of Peru

It was formerly linked to the National Council of Science, Technology and Technological Innovation (CONCYTEC) and the Geophysical Institute of Peru (IGP).

== List of ministers ==
| Minister | Party | Start | President |
|---|---|---|---|
Ministers of Public Instruction, Charity, and Ecclesiastical Affairs (1837–1839)
| Manuel Villarán Loli | Cleric | February 5, 1837 | Andrés de Santa Cruz |
| Agustín Guillermo Charún | Cleric | November 26, 1839 | Agustín Gamarra |
| Benito Laso de la Vega | Liberal | October 20, 1842 | Francisco de Vidal |
Ministers of Justice and Instruction (1852–1935)
See list
Ministers of Education
| Ernesto Montagne Markholz | | September 12, 1935 | Óscar R. Benavides |
| Óscar Arrús | | April 19, 1939 | Óscar R. Benavides |
| Pedro M. Oliveira | | December 8, 1939 | Manuel Prado Ugarteche |
| Mariano Lino Cornejo | | April 28, 1943 | Manuel Prado Ugarteche |
| Enrique Laroza | | 1943 | Manuel Prado Ugarteche |
| Jorge Basadre Grohmann | Independent | July 28, 1945 | José L. Bustamante y Rivero |
| Luis E. Valcárcel | | October 7, 1945 | José L. Bustamante y Rivero |
| Cristóbal de Losada y Puga | | January 11, 1947 | José L. Bustamante y Rivero |
| Óscar Torres M. | | October 30, 1947 | José L. Bustamante y Rivero |
| Honorio Delgado Espinoza | | June 17, 1948 | José L. Bustamante y Rivero |
| Juan Mendoza Rodríguez | | November 1, 1948 | Manuel A. Odría |
| Alfonso Balaguer Regalado | | December 18, 1952 | Manuel A. Odría |
| Carlos González Iglesias | | January 29, 1954 | Manuel A. Odría |
| Carlos Rodríguez Pastor | | September 15, 1955 | Manuel A. Odría |
| Mariano Iberico Rodríguez | | December 2, 1955 | Manuel A. Odría |
| Juan Mendoza Rodríguez | | December 24, 1955 | Manuel A. Odría |
| Jorge Basadre Grohmann | Independent | July 28, 1956 | Manuel Prado Ugarteche |
| Enrique Labarthe | | 1957 | Manuel Prado Ugarteche |
| Jorge Basadre Grohmann | | 1958 | Manuel Prado Ugarteche |
| Ulises Montoya N. | | 1958 | Manuel Prado Ugarteche |
| Emilio Romero Padilla | | October 17, 1958 | Manuel Prado Ugarteche |
| José Rubio Rolando | | July 26, 1959 | Manuel Prado Ugarteche |
| Alfredo Parra Carreño | | June 6, 1960 | Manuel Prado Ugarteche |
| Alfonso Villanueva Pinillas | | May 2, 1961 | Manuel Prado Ugarteche |
| Darío Acevedo Criado | | November 19, 1961 | Manuel Prado Ugarteche |
| Franklin Pease Olivera | | July 18, 1962 | Military Junta of 1968-1980 |
| Francisco Miró Quesada Cantuarias | Acción Popular | July 28, 1963 | Fernando Belaunde Terry |
| Ernesto Montagne Sánchez | | October 3, 1964 | Fernando Belaunde Terry |
| Carlos Cueto Fernandini | Acción Popular | July 30, 1965 | Fernando Belaunde Terry |
| José Navarro Grau | Acción Popular | September 15, 1965 | Fernando Belaunde Terry |
| Carlos Cueto Fernandini | Acción Popular | April 15, 1966 | Fernando Belaunde Terry |
| Enrique Tola Mendoza | Acción Popular | January 27, 1967 | Fernando Belaunde Terry |
| Octavio Mongrut Muñoz | Acción Popular | September 6, 1967 | Fernando Belaunde Terry |
| José Jiménez Borja | Acción Popular | June 1, 1968 | Fernando Belaunde Terry |
| Augusto Tamayo Vargas | | October 2, 1968 | Fernando Belaunde Terry |
| Alfredo Arrisueño Cornejo | | October 3, 1968 | Juan Velasco Alvarado |
| Alfredo Carpio Becerra | | April 27, 1971 | Juan Velasco Alvarado |
| Ramón Humberto Miranda Ampuero | | February 1, 1975 | Juan Velasco Alvarado |
| Otto Eléspuru Revoredo | | January 1, 1977 | Francisco Morales Bermúdez |
| José Francisco Guabloche Rodríguez | | September 16, 1978 | Francisco Morales Bermúdez |
| Luis Felipe Alarco Larraburre | Acción Popular | 28 July 1980 | Fernando Belaunde Terry |
| José Benavides Muñoz | Acción Popular | February 4, 1981 | Fernando Belaunde Terry |
| Patricio Ricketts Rey de Castro | | August 15, 1983 | Fernando Belaunde Terry |
| Valentín Paniagua | Acción Popular | April 10, de 1984 | Fernando Belaunde Terry |
| Andrés Cardó Franco | Acción Popular | October 12, 1984 | Fernando Belaunde Terry |
| Grover Pango Vildoso | APRA | July 28, 1985 | Alan García |
| Mercedes Cabanillas | APRA | June 29, 1987 | Alan García |
| Efraín Orbegozo | APRA | August 28, 1988 | Alan García |
| Mercedes Cabanillas | APRA | May 9, 1990 | Alan García |
| Gloria Helfer Palacios | Izquierda Unida | July 28, 1990 | Alberto Fujimori |
| Óscar de la Puente Raygada | | December 12, 1990 | Alberto Fujimori |
| Augusto Antoniolli Vásquez | | November 7, 1991 | Alberto Fujimori |
| Alberto Varillas Montenegro | | May 9, 1991 | Alberto Fujimori |
| Raúl Vittor Alfaro | | August 19, 1993 | Alberto Fujimori |
| Jorge Trelles Montero | | February 18, 1994 | Alberto Fujimori |
| Pedro Villena Hidalgo | | October 13, 1994 | Alberto Fujimori |
| Dante Córdova Blanco | | June 8, 1995 | Alberto Fujimori |
| Domingo Palermo Cabrejos | | April 11, de 1996 | Alberto Fujimori |
| Felipe Ignacio García Escudero | | January 6, 1999 | Alberto Fujimori |
| Federico Salas Guevara Schultz | | July 29, 2000 | Alberto Fujimori |
| Marcial Rubio Correa | | November 25, 2000 | Valentín Paniagua |
| Nicolás Lynch Gamero | Independent | July 28, 2001 | Alejandro Toledo |
| Gerardo Ayzanoa del Carpio | Perú Posible | July 21, 2002 | Alejandro Toledo |
| Carlos Malpica Faustor | Independent | June 28, 2003 | Alejandro Toledo |
| Javier Sota Nadal | | February 16, 2004 | Alejandro Toledo |
| José Antonio Chang Escobedo | APRA | July 28, 2006 | Alan García |
| Víctor Raúl Díaz Chávez | APRA | March 19, 2011 | Alan García |
| Patricia Salas O'Brien | | July 28, 2011 | Ollanta Humala |
| Jaime Saavedra Chanduví | | October 31, 2013 | Ollanta Humala / Pedro Pablo Kuczynski |
| Marilú Martens Cortés | | December 18, 2016 | Pedro Pablo Kuczynski |
| Idel Vexler | | September 17, 2017 | Pedro Pablo Kuczynski |
| Daniel Alfaro Paredes | Independent | April 2, 2018 | Martín Vizcarra |
| Flor Pablo Medina | Independent | March 11, 2019 | Martín Vizcarra |
| Martín Benavides Abanto | Independent | February 13, 2020 | Martín Vizcarra |
| Fernando d'Alessio Ipinza | Independent | November 12 2020 | Manuel Merino |
| Ricardo Cuenca Pareja | Independent | November 18 2020 | Francisco Sagasti |
| Juan Cadillo León | Independent | July 29, 2021 | Pedro Castillo |
| Carlos Gallardo Gómez | Independent | October 6, 2021 | Pedro Castillo |
| Rosendo Serna Román | Together for Peru | December 28, 2021 | Pedro Castillo |
| Patricia Correa | Independent | December 10, 2022 | Dina Boluarte |
| Óscar Becerra | Independent | December 21, 2022 | Dina Boluarte |
| Magnet Márquez Ramírez | Independent | April 23, 2023 | Dina Boluarte |
| Miriam Ponce Vértiz | Independent | September 6, 2023 | Dina Boluarte |
| Morgan Quero | Independent | April 1, 2024 | Dina Boluarte |

== See also ==
- Education in Peru
