= Education in Peru =

Ministry of Education
- Minister of Education: Rosendo Serna

National education budget (2019)
- Budget: $8.25 billion USD: 3.847% of GDP; 17.49% of national budget
- Per student: $779: 11.2% of GDP per capita

General details
- Primary languages: Spanish, Quechua, Aymara, English
- System type: Central
- Creation of the Ministry: 1837

Literacy (2018)
- Total: 94.408%
- Male: 97.1%
- Female: 91.7%

Enrollment (2019)
- Total: 6.5 million
- Primary: 3.7 million
- Secondary: 2.8 million

Education in Peru is under the jurisdiction of the Ministry of Education, which oversees formulating, implementing and supervising the national educational policy. According to the Constitution of Peru, education is compulsory and free in public schools for the initial, primary and secondary levels. It is also free in public universities for students who are unable to pay tuition and have an adequate academic performance.

Throughout Peru's history, the nation's educational structure and quality has remained poor. Elites who organized the educational system promoted conservatism and authoritarianism while also defending a social hierarchy that prevented a social mobility that would improve the lives of citizens. The ineffectiveness of regulation, corruption and the government's lack of interest in improvements has contributed to the low quality of Peru's educational structure. Peru's lack of higher education accreditation and its reliance on extractivism – with mining not requiring much scientific support – has also been detrimental to universities and research facilities within the nation. Congress has recently weakened the accreditation standards at universities further.

The Human Rights Measurement Initiative (HRMI) finds that Peru is fulfilling 90.5% of what it should be fulfilling for the right to education based on the country's level of income. HRMI breaks down the right to education by looking at the rights to both primary education and secondary education. While taking into consideration Peru's income level, the nation is achieving 89.3% of what should be possible based on its resources (income) for primary education and 91.6% for secondary education.

== History ==
=== Pre-Inca cultures ===
No written or oral records exist of an organized educational system in the pre-Inca cultures. However, the demonstrated level of evolution of these cultures indirectly suggests the existence of an educational system. Each culture developed an ideal way of training people for their own competitive interests and particular specializations. Such training and education could explain the metalwork, ceramics, and textiles that have survived to this day, which were produced with techniques which had been passed down and perfected, and have been lost with the conquering of many other cultures.

=== Incan empire ===
Formal education according to Inca Garcilaso de la Vega (in his Comentarios Reales de los Incas, Book II, chapter XIX) was founded by Inca Roca, and spread by Pachacútec, the ninth Sapa Inca.

This education was exclusively designed for the royal elite, and later for the sons of conquered chiefs, primarily taught in Cusco. At this level, they were educated to become administrators and leaders. The teachers were Amautas, men well-versed in philosophy and morality. The education was strict and punishment was used. The curriculum was based in mathematics and astronomy, both necessary for an economic system based in agriculture. Learning Quechua was mandatory, more for political than educational reasons. The common people were trained in various occupations and trades necessary for the empire.

=== Viceroyalty of Peru ===
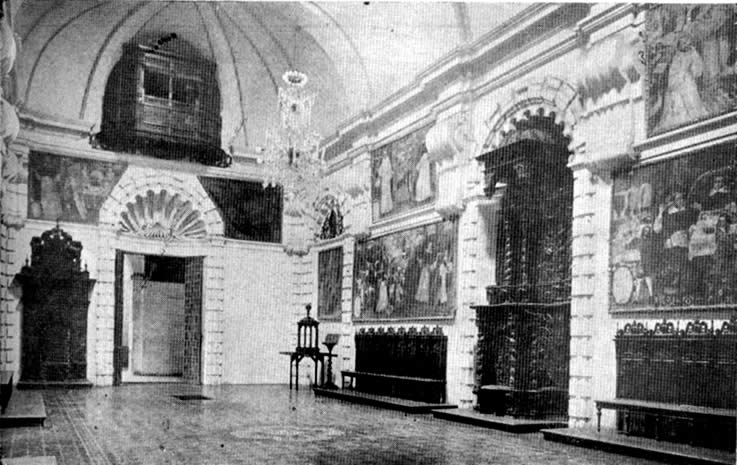
The Convent of Santo Domingo, where the National University of San Marcos began to function in 1551 as the first university in the Americas

In the colony, it was deemed necessary to instruct the conquered people in the doctrines of Roman Catholicism, and transform them into loyal subjects. They began re-educating the native adults and providing instruction to the children and youth, indoctrinating and educating them in the rudiments of European social life to use them to benefit the State. This was called elementary education. However, the native population in general did not have access to formal education, only informal education. The education of the time was predominantly religious, and run by different religious orders and priests.

There also existed a "middle school," where they educated the Creoles, Mestizos, and some wealthy merchants; and "colegio de caciques" (or "college of chiefs"), which was established in 1536 and ran until it was abolished by Simón Bolívar.

More formal education, which was accessible only to those of the aristocratic class, people with political and economic power, taught reading, writing, mathematics, morality and religious classes at various universities in the colony. These included the Universidad Nacional Mayor de San Marcos (founded 1551), San Cristóbal of Huamanga University (founded in 1677) and National University of Saint Anthony the Abbot in Cuzco (founded in 1692).

=== 19th century ===
Through the 19th century, education in Peru was decentralized, with local governments overseeing the curricula, funds and teaching staff of schools. Following Peru's independence from Spain in 1821, education began to receive attention from the new national government, with José de San Martín establishing the Monitorial System as the main method of education in Peru in 1822. In 1825, Simón Bolívar expanded on the Monitorial system; he ordered the creation of a university in Trujillo, the building normal schools in the capital cities of each Peruvian department and the separation of primary and secondary educations. The 1828 Constitution of Peru promised the establishment of public education, though this was never immediately realized due to a lack of funding and political instability within the country.

The first reform occurred in 1833 when a Department of Elementary Education was established in Lima to oversee primary education in the country. The department instituted multiple changes that included the prohibition of collecting student fees, ending coeducation, excellence bonuses for teachers and school schedules. This reform proved to do little to improve the quality of education in Peru.

President Ramón Castilla performed further modifications to Peru's educational system. In 1850 he established a more centralized role of the education department, separated private schools from public schools and created a more modern educational tier system; primary, secondary and university educational levels. Later in 1855, Castilla created the University Council, imported professors from France and made education for boys and girls identical at primary levels. Finally in 1861, the National University of San Marcos was made the central location for university education in Peru.

=== 20th century ===
The Government of Peru first assumed full responsibility for education under the José Pardo y Barreda administration. A 1905 law it gave the national government authority over primary education instead of being administered by municipal governments, established free and compulsory education, reorganized the Department of Elementary Education and provided direct funding to teachers.

==== 1920 Organic Law of Education ====
Two actions occurred in 1920 to reform education in Peru; the Organic Law of Education moved Peru towards a more developed educational system, pushing for improvements in administration, funding, attendance and quality, and then a constitutional amendment that required a primary and secondary school for each sex for each district and province capital. Twenty years later in 1940, however, a congressional review revealed that only five percent of the reforms enacted in 1920 were being executed and that funding and promotion of the reforms were inadequate, concluding that Peru made no significant improvements in education.

==== 1941 Organic Law of Education ====
Following the congressional review, another Organic Law of Education was established in 1941. This law provided primary education students studies that were specific to certain populations though had the same core content; students in urban areas received an industrial-focused education while those in rural areas obtained an education based in agriculture. With secondary education, the law provided industry specific studies as well as vocational studies. The law required schools to teach civics, geography, history and religion, all in the Spanish language by a Peruvian citizen. Compulsory education was enacted up to the age of 40, with educators traveling to rural areas to teach indigenous Peruvians courses on animal husbandry, farming and sanitation. At the university level, institutions were granted autonomy from the government while a fixed budget was established in the national budget. The education system established in 1941 lasted in Peru into the 1960s.

A report by the Ministry of Public Education that was presented in Bogotá, Colombia, at the 1963 Conference of Ministers of Education highlighted multiple problems in Peru's educational structure. The minister shared that poor development hampered funding, illiteracy common, cultural barriers prevents indigenous groups from being educated and that transportation to educational facilities was poor.

==== Revolutionary government ====
The Revolutionary Government of the Armed Forces of Peru attempted to democratize schools in Peru by constructing new schools and promoting the inclusion of the indigenous peoples of Peru in education. In 1972, the National Policy for Bilingual Education came into effect; a monumental step considering the teaching of any indigenous language was previously prohibited.

==== Fujimori government ====
The neoliberal government of authoritarian president Alberto Fujimori used education as a part of his populist platform. In negotiations with the World Bank, Fujimori forcefully advocated for funding to build new schools – which was already supposed to occur – in a strategic effort to establish more political support through tangible projects Peruvians could experience firsthand. The building of new schools occurred primarily in rural areas, where Fujimori built much of his support combatting Shining Path during internal conflict in Peru. In 1996, Fujimori passed laws that encouraged investment in private education, offering tax relief to investors, leading to a further surge in private schooling.

Though Peru constructed new schools and primary education initially benefitted, improvement in education overall remained profoundly poor by the turn of the century. While school construction funding jumped from 1.4% to 15% of the total education budget between 1990 and 1994, spending from the budget per student was the lowest in Latin America. The quality of school construction was also negligent, with multiple schools collapsing or requiring large amounts of repair years later.

=== 21st century ===
Into the 2000s, Peru's emerging middle class and poor families also began to opt for private schooling due to an influx in low-fee private schools. The government of Alejandro Toledo signed into law the "National Agreement" in July 2002 to turn Peru from the Fujimori government's policies, adopting a policy to provide universal access to education to all Peruvians. A report review the agreement released in 2005 found that while enrollment of students increased in Peru, the quality of education remained low.

In 2006, President Alan García decentralized Peru's education system, resulting with municipal governments overseeing their local schools. The move was heavily criticized as small local governments lacked the funding and resources of the national government.

By the 2010s, studies found that low-fee private schools did not provide the quality education of higher cost private schools; low-fee schools are often superficially adapted into education facilities from small private dwellings, hire inexperienced teachers, and lack curriculum planning. Nonetheless, the majority of poor families are excluded from the private educational market. Corruption and bribery are rampant in private school admissions due to lack of government regulation.

During the administration of President Ollanta Humala, funding for education increased dramatically.

Congress in the early 2020s, Congress pushed to weaken accreditation standards at universities.

== Statistics ==
=== Education quality ===
In 2009, the Programme for International Student Assessment (PISA), created by the Organisation for Economic Co-operation and Development, exam placed Peru last out of nine participating Latin American countries. According to the OECD's 2018 Programme for International Student Assessment (PISA), Peru was ranked low, placing 64th of 77 countries listed. The U.S. News & World Report article 2020 Best Countries for Education ranked Peru 59th of 73 countries in education quality.

=== Funding ===
In 1963, the national government provided 20.70% of its total budget towards education. By 2000 under the Fujimori government, this percentage decreased to 15.25% of the national budget. By 2010, this percentage fell again to a low of 13.55%. Since 2012, funding has continually increased, with the percentage of the national budget spent on education standing at 17.49% in 2019.

== Educational stages ==
Minimum age (common)	Year	Months	Schools	
2-3	N/A	N/A	Nursery	Estimulación Temprana
3-4	3 años	N/A	Pre-school	Kinder / Educación inicial
4-5	4 años	March - December	Pre-school	Kinder / Educación inicial
5-6	5 años	March - December	Pre-school	Kinder / Educación inicial
Compulsory education
6-7	1° de Primaria	March - December	Primary school / elementary school	Primaria / Educación básica
7-8	2° de Primaria	March - December	Primary school / elementary school	Primaria / Educación básica
8-9	3° de Primaria	March - December	Primary school / elementary school	Primaria / Educación básica
9-10	4° de Primaria	March - December	Primary school / elementary school	Primaria / Educación básica
10-11	5° de Primaria	March - December	Primary school / elementary school	Primaria / Educación básica
11-12	6° de Primaria	March - December	Primary school / elementary school	Primaria / Educación básica
12-13	1° de Secundaria	March - December	Secondary school / high school Bachelor's degree / International Baccaulaurate (only in exclusive private schools and in High Performance Colleges)	Secundaria / Educación secundaria Bachillerato / Bachillerato Internacional
13-14	2° de Secundaria	March - December	Secondary school / high school Bachelor's degree / International Baccaulaurate (only in exclusive private schools and in High Performance Colleges)	Secundaria / Educación secundaria Bachillerato / Bachillerato Internacional
14-15	3° de Secundaria	March - December	Secondary school / high school Bachelor's degree / International Baccaulaurate (only in exclusive private schools and in High Performance Colleges)	Secundaria / Educación secundaria Bachillerato / Bachillerato Internacional
15-16	4° de Secundaria	March - December	Secondary school / high school Bachelor's degree / International Baccaulaurate (only in exclusive private schools and in High Performance Colleges)	Secundaria / Educación secundaria Bachillerato / Bachillerato Internacional
16-17	5° de Secundaria	March - December	Secondary school / high school Bachelor's degree / International Baccaulaurate (only in exclusive private schools and in High Performance Colleges)	Secundaria / Educación secundaria Bachillerato / Bachillerato Internacional
Higher education
N/A	1st year	1st and 2nd semesters	University - Bachelor's degree / Licentiate	Licenciatura - Bachillerato / Educación superior
N/A	2nd year	3rd and 4th semesters	University - Bachelor's degree / Licentiate	Licenciatura - Bachillerato / Educación superior
N/A	3rd year	5th and 6th semesters	University - Bachelor's degree / Licentiate	Licenciatura - Bachillerato / Educación superior
N/A	4th year	7th and 8th semesters	University - Bachelor's degree / Licentiate	Licenciatura - Bachillerato / Educación superior
N/A	5th year	9th and 10th semesters	University - Bachelor's degree / Licentiate	Licenciatura - Bachillerato / Educación superior
N/A	N/A	...	Master's degree	Maestría
N/A	N/A	...	Doctorate	Doctorado - Ph.D

== Early Education ==
This education begins from age six, and exists to max out the periods of a child's development in which a child lovely assimilates determined learning. It is important to know how to focus the educational effort for each stage of a child's development to offer the greatest benefit and opportunities. In early education, the child controls his or her own learning with the assistance of internal and external agents which offer optimal conditions for realizing his or her capabilities.

The objective of early education is to promote the development of the child through a rights-based approach with the involvement of the parents (internal agents), people close to the child, educators (external agents), implementing early education centres with strategies based on free play and the role of children.

== Primary school ==
The student begins in the first cycle, which consists of the first and second grade. The age of the children entering this stage of their education is six years. This level begins at first grade, and ends with sixth grade and is divided, for curricular purposes, into three cycles: cycle one (first and second grade), cycle two (third and fourth grade), and cycle three (fifth and sixth grade); after sixth grade, the student passes on to secondary school. Additionally, there are decision-making systems available for the parents to determine.

Between 1980 and 1988, large reductions in funding towards education in Latin America caused enrollment in primary schools to heavily decline. Because accessibility and student performance in primary school has been historically low, the Ministry of Education has focused on addressing such issues in the last decade. From 2007 to 2015, reading comprehension levels increased by 34% and mathematic scores, 20%. While there has been improvement in student performance, there continues to be an education disparity between children who live in rural areas compared to those who live in urban areas, in which children in more rural areas have reduced academic performance. The education gap between rural and urban areas is maintained throughout secondary school as well.

Of the 93% of children aged between 6 and 11 who attend primary school, 23% are enrolled in grades lower than their age group. This trend is especially prevalent in children whose native language is Quechua or an Amazonian language, as well as children who are extremely poor. There is also an increasing percentage of children that are completing their primary education by the age of 12 and 13. Due to poor educational performance and inadequate learning, at-risk students are more prone to repeat grade levels. By the time these children graduate primary school, they are already at an age where they can enter the job market, so they drop out to work instead of continuing their education. In Latin America, the economic productivity and income of an individual is largely determined by their level of education. This produces positive welfare outcomes and an increase in financial return rate from the individual. Because most individuals in Latin America drop out of school after finishing their primary education, there has been a large investment in educational resources and funding in primary education, where the largest percentage compared to secondary and tertiary school.

== Secondary school ==
Secondary school consists of five years, from first to fifth year. Pupils are taught a wide range of subjects, including Peruvian history, world history, physics, biology, chemistry, computer science, mathematics, English as a foreign language, literature, etc. Students are also taught by multiple teachers, unlike in primary school where they are taught by a single teacher. Grades are based on a system of 0 to 20, where 0 to 10 would be seen as a failing grade.

However, since 2022, a new grading scale has been applied, which made schools switch from number grading scales to an "achievement level" or "standards grading" system, being the default grading system for students who graduated after 2023. However, some schools still use an equivalency chart from number to letter grades.

NUMBER TO LETTER GRADES - PERU
LETTER GRADE	ACHIEVEMENT LEVEL	NUMBER EQUIVALENT (OPTIONAL)	US GRADE EQUIVALENT
AD	Logro destacado (Outstanding achievement)	19 - 20	A
A	Logro esperado (Expected achievement)	15 - 18	B
B	En proceso (In process)	11 - 14	C
C	En inicio (At the inicial level)	00 - 10	F

In 2014, 81.5% of the Peruvian population had attended secondary school. The amount of enrollment in secondary school education continues to increase, but students are experiencing school delay. For example, 13.7% of students aged between 12 and 17 are in a lower grade compared to their age group. The likelihood of this trend is 3.5% higher in males than females. The delay in grade level advancement is in part due to the difficulty in transitioning from learning from a single teacher to learning from multiple teachers. Difficulties can arise from the need to understand different presentation of material or the different expectations different instructors may have.

== Higher education ==
Higher education in Peru consists of technological colleges, both public and private. They offer courses lasting three years (approximately 3,000 hours of study), graduating with a title as Technical Professionals. Some courses may be four years in length (approximately 4,000 hours of study), and a student would graduate with the title of Professional.

=== University education ===
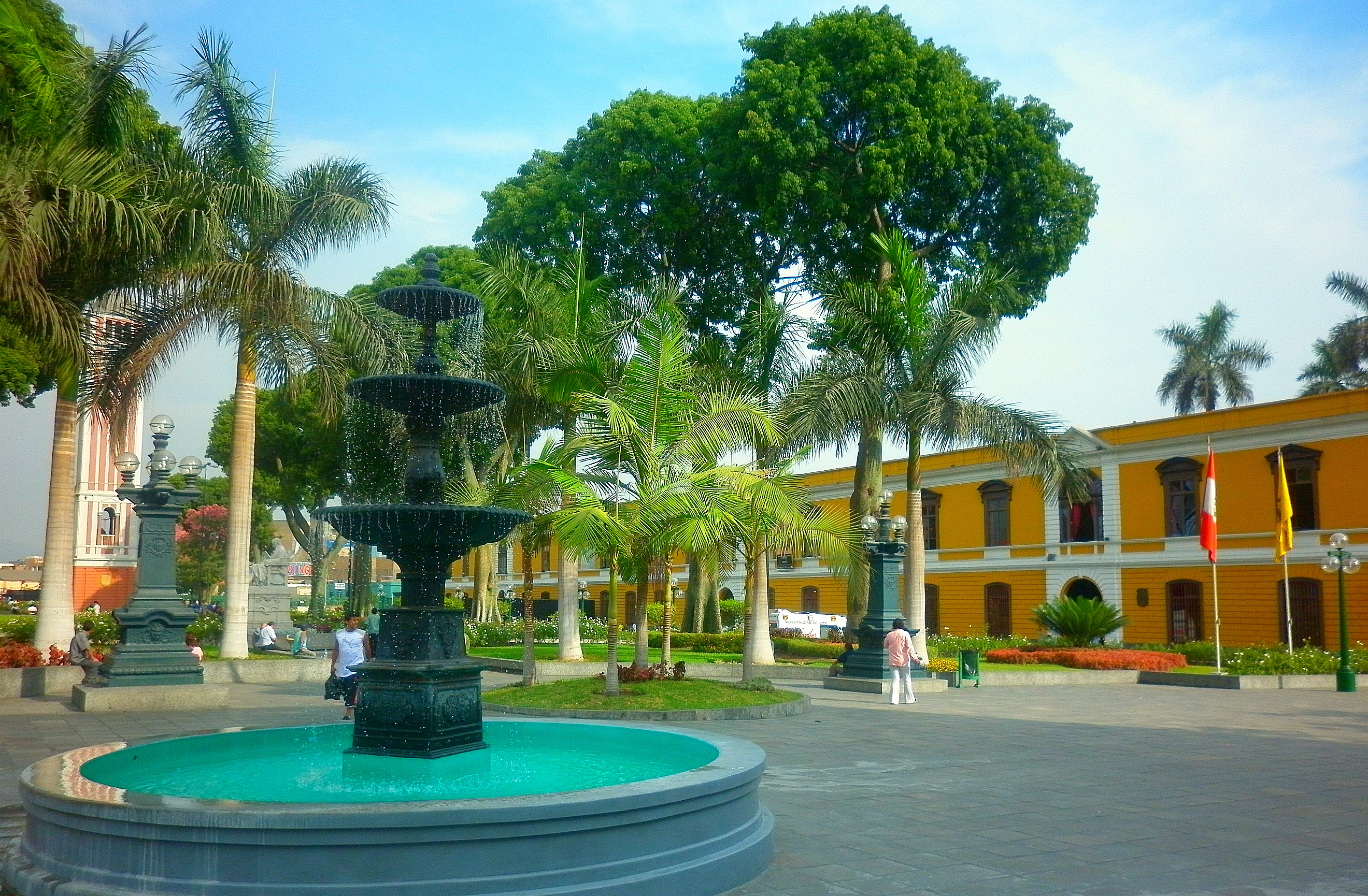
National University of San Marcos

Higher education in the form of universities began officially in Peru and the Americas with the establishment of the Royal and Pontifical University of San Marcos in the City of the Kings by the Royal Decree issued by King Carlos V on May 12, 1551. The institute opened as the Sala Capitular del Convento de Santo Domingo in 1553. In 1571, it obtained Papal approval and in 1574 it received the name of National University of San Marcos.

The precursor to the National University of San Marcos, the "Estudio General o Universidad," was established in Cusco by the Dominicans on July 1, 1548. This institution was responsible for teaching evangelists for the new lands, and taught scripture, theology, grammar, and the Quechuan language.

=== Non-university education ===
In Peru, non-university education is provided by technological institutions, educational institutions, technical production education centers, and other facilities. These institutions are under the supervision of the Ministry of Education, which is responsible for providing their operating licenses.

==== Professional technical education degrees ====
Technical vocational training is organized into three levels of training that are defined by the functions that can be performed by people during the development of a productive activity according to organizational and technological variables. In this sense, the degrees of training agree with the different qualifying levels of the productive sector.

- Elementary degree: No academic requirements. The elementary level is offered in Colleges with Technical Variant and in the Technical Productive Centers (CETPRO Centros Técnicos Productivo). It has a variable duration between 300 and 2,000 hours. Certification is awarded to the Nation with mention in the vocational option studied. This model helps develop occupational abilities in the scope of the execution of operative activities proper of the productive process and with predetermined instructions. The level of technical responsibility focuses on carrying out the corresponding corrective actions and informing the technical problems that are presented. There are two cycles available in the CETPROs either Basic or Medium. They are not consecutive. One can receive a Title (Titulo) after 1,000 hours in the basic cycle or after 2,000 hours in the medium cycle. However, students receive a certificate after each module (each module varies between 50 and 200 hours). The vast majority of students do not receive their Title because they receive a Certificate after each module. Due to their economic situation, the students of CETPROs often wish to enter the labour force as rapidly as possible. Common occupational courses include things like Hairdressing, Cooking and Baking (so-called "Hosteleria y Turismo), Textile Fabrication, Carpentry, Computers, Basic Electricity, Repair of Electronics, Welding, Furniture Assembly etc.
- Middle degree: The average grade is post-secondary and is offered in Institutes of Higher Technological Education. It has a variable duration between 1,500 and 2,500 hours. The title of Technician is awarded to the Nation. In this model, abilities related to the application of knowledge are developed in a wide range of work activities specific to their professional area. As a responsibility, these student organizes the work and activities of their immediate team, solves situations in the production process while applying the most appropriate knowledge. It must follow the predetermined specifications in the overall execution of the process, being autonomous in technical aspects of its area.
- Superior degree: The postgraduate level is higher and it is offered in the Institutes of Higher Technological Education (I.E.S.T. Institutos de Educación Superior Technológico) with a minimum duration of 3,060 hours. The title of Technical Professional is awarded to the Nation. In this model, ways of planning develop along with organization, coordination and control of the productive processes; And responsibility for the quality of the final product. The training of this degree should guarantee a preparation oriented to the technological innovation and the execution of processes and procedures of formalized work, with autonomy and capacity of decision in the scope of its competence.

== Organisation ==
=== School Units ===
All educational institutions in the country are under the jurisdiction of a Local Educational Management Unit (Spanish: Unidad de Gestión Educativa Local; UGEL) since 2003. The department of Lima and Callao have a combined total of 220 UGEL.

=== Emblematic Schools ===
An Emblematic Educational Institution (Spanish: Institución Educativa Emblemática; I.E.E.) is a public educational institution of historical significance. The term dates back to a law passed by Alan García during his second presidency (2006–2011) that made note of a number of public schools established during the 20th century, known as Grand School Units, to allocate funding to them.

== Issues ==
=== Access ===
The Ministry of Education reported in 2017 that about thirty percent of Peruvians at the age of 15 and older accessed university education and that of that percentage, thirty percent spoke Spanish while twenty-one percent spoke an indigenous language. It was also revealed in the 2017 report that while forty-nine percent of Peruvians in urban areas had internet access, only eleven percent of citizens in rural areas had access.

==== Rural and indigenous students ====
Rural students have a higher likelihood of temporarily or permanently dropping out of school to find work, usually in hazardous mining or construction sites, to provide for their families. Some children may need to travel three hours to get to school, some even have to walk eight hours a day. Teachers in rural area often experience long commutes that cause a delay in classes.

Indigenous students in Peru are at a disadvantage because children learn more if they are taught in their native language. Indigenous languages have historically been suppressed and stigmatized by colonizers in replacement of learning Spanish, which has become the dominant language in schools (and the country). The recent movement to reincorporate indigenous languages has been mostly dominated by wealthy, educated Peruvians. Indigenous parents tend to not want their children to learn their native language in school since Spanish is required for high paying jobs and career opportunities. These parents condemn non-indigenous activists who try to force their own point-of-view on parents to shape perspectives of their own culture. However, defining Spanish as the dominant language in the education system lead to a loss of indigenous cultural identity and feelings of inferiority about indigenous peoples.

By the early 2000s, indigenous and ally groups began to reintroduce discussion about Quechua language rights in schools. The state itself has done little in granting Quechua and Quechua-speakers the rights they deserve. The laws that have been passed have either been undone or are not implemented. Article 17 of the Peruvian constitution states, "The government promotes…bilingual and intercultural education in accordance with the individual characteristics of each zone. It preserves the country's various cultural and linguistic manifestations. It promotes national integration."

Indigenous students have lower levels of achievement in comparison to their Spanish counterparts. In the four PISA studies Peru has participated in to test learning outcomes in reading, mathematics, and science, ethnicity (as well as socioeconomic status) has been correlated with low academic achievement. Indigenous students are more likely to have to work while undergoing schooling, live in rural areas where quality education is lacking, and face language barriers which negatively impact learning outcomes.

=== Quality ===
Peru's education quality has remained poor throughout its history. Though the Peruvian government oversees education throughout the nation with the Ministry of Education, regulation is decentralized since authority is passed down to lower branches of the ministry. Teachers in Peru are unmotivated and distressed also by low wages – the lowest of any country in Latin America – lacking of government support, they receiving poor education themselves without regulation and are often overwhelmed by large class size. It has been recommended that Peru improve its funding of public education while also creating a system to evaluate the quality of teaching in schools.

In higher education, a lack of regulation and accreditation has also resulted in poor educational quality. There has also been a lack of interest regarding research in Peru as the nation's economy primarily relies on mining resources – which does not require advanced scientific or technological capabilities – resulting in lower quality universities.
