= Huaca Huantinamarca =

Archaeological site in Peru

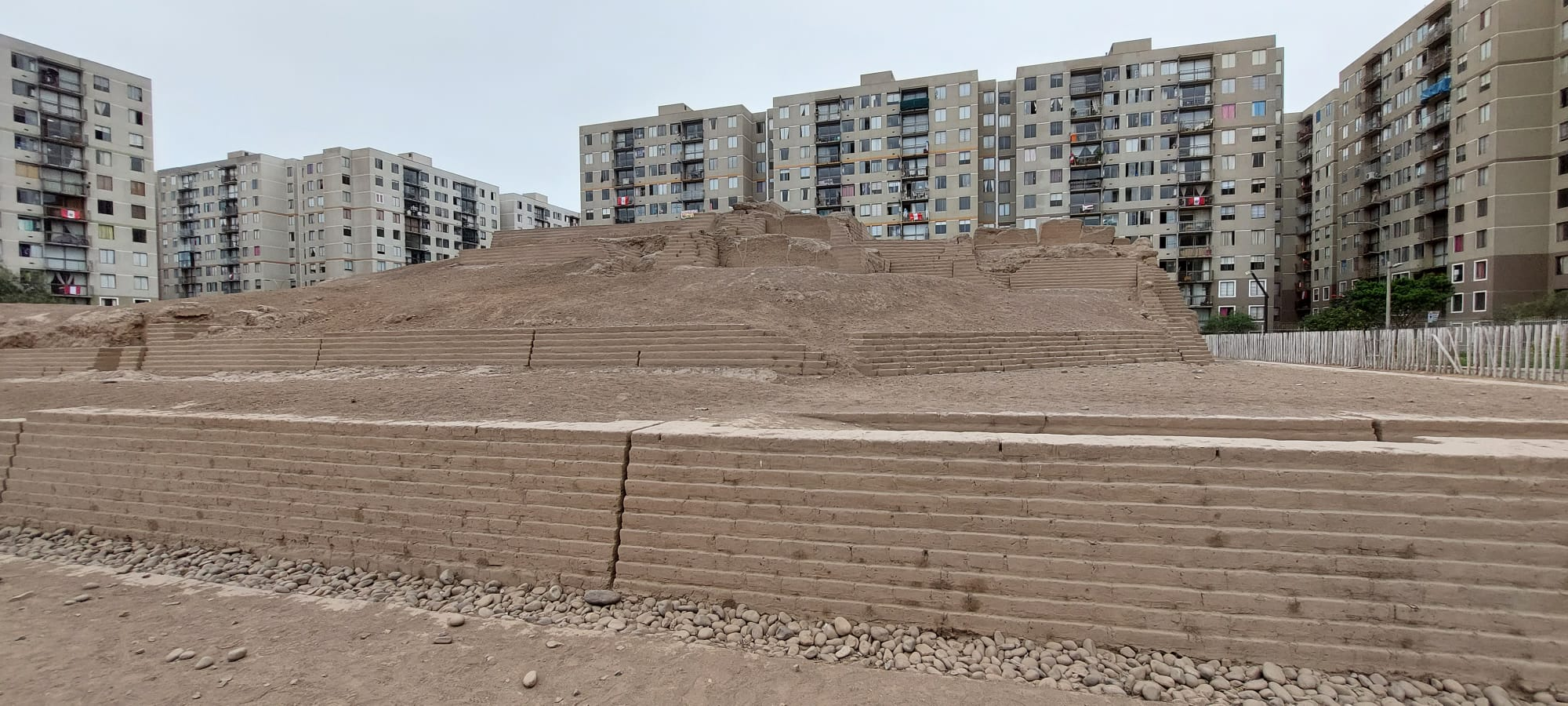
- Huaca Huantinamarca in 2022

- Location within Peru
- 12°05′00″S 77°05′26″W
- Type: Settlement
- Location: Lima, Peru

The Huaca Huantinamarca is an archaeological site of the Ichma culture located in San Miguel District, in Lima, Peru. It is located on the first block of the Avenue Brígida Silva de Ochoa.

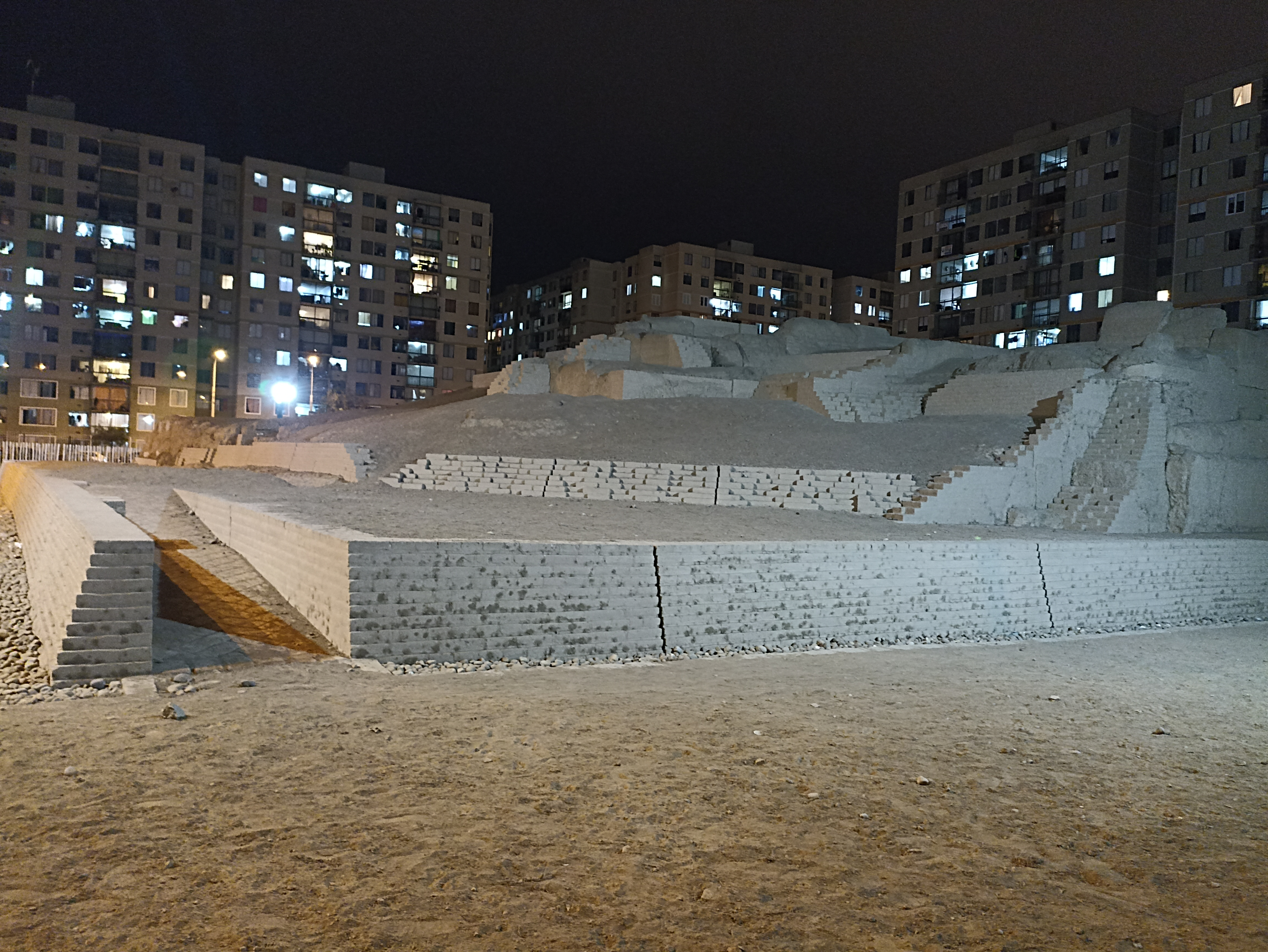
The beauty of the architecture of the Huaca Huantinamarca, expressed in its forms and levels

On March 27, 2002, through National Directorial Resolution No. 233, the National Institute of Culture (INC) declared Huaca Huantinamarca as Cultural Patrimony of the Nation.It is located in the lower valley of the Rímac River, 50 meters above sea level, on the periphery of the Maranga archaeological complex. This building occupies approximately 1,500 square meters and was constructed on an area of 3,652 square meters.

It has the particularity of being a truncated pyramid of a monumental nature that was built, remodelled and transformed over the years, which gives it an architectural complexity. The building is composed of various patios, enclosures and corridors, which were built during different moments in its history; and on a base of walls made of mud through a technique known as ”tapial corrido".

The huaca is surrounded by the ”Parques de la Huaca” condominium, as part of a public park, and, thanks to the work of the municipality, is considered by the neighbourhood as part of their cultural identity and history, motivating its conservation for future generations.

== Origins and Etymology ==
There are two possible explanations for the origin of the name Huantinamarca. The first refers to the fact that it was connected to the Maranga archaeological complex through ditches bringing water from the Huatica water channel, and for this reason many researchers referred to the Maranga complex as ”Huatica”. In addition, Ernst Middendorf points out that Maranga was the seat of the oracle of the valley, known as ”Huaca” or ”Guatan". Similarly, Julio César Tello used the term ”Huatika Marka” to refer to the Maranga Complex in his notes.

Secondly, Huantinamarca can also be translated as ”the town of people who suffer from warts”, an infectious disease also called ”Peruvian wart”. This is supported by the statement of Fray Diego Gonzáles Holguín (1612) who indicated that ”huantti” in Quechua means ”warts", and ”huanttivnccytam vncconi" would mean ”to be sick of them".

== History ==
Huaca Huantinamarca has had many uses throughout its history: it was part of the Maranga complex, occupied during the Late Horizon period, subsequently a pre-Hispanic mausoleum, a place inhabited by Spaniards, remains to which a strong magical and sacred power was attributed, a republican cemetery, a pre-Hispanic ruin in the rural landscape, a fairground auditorium, and today it is the centerpiece of a public park associated to a modern residential complex.

== Chronology ==
This timeline exposes the three moments of occupation of the Huaca Huantinamarca, being the first in the pre-Columbian period (until 1532 AD), the second in the colonial period (1535 AD to 1821 AD), and the last and the modern period (1822 AD to today).

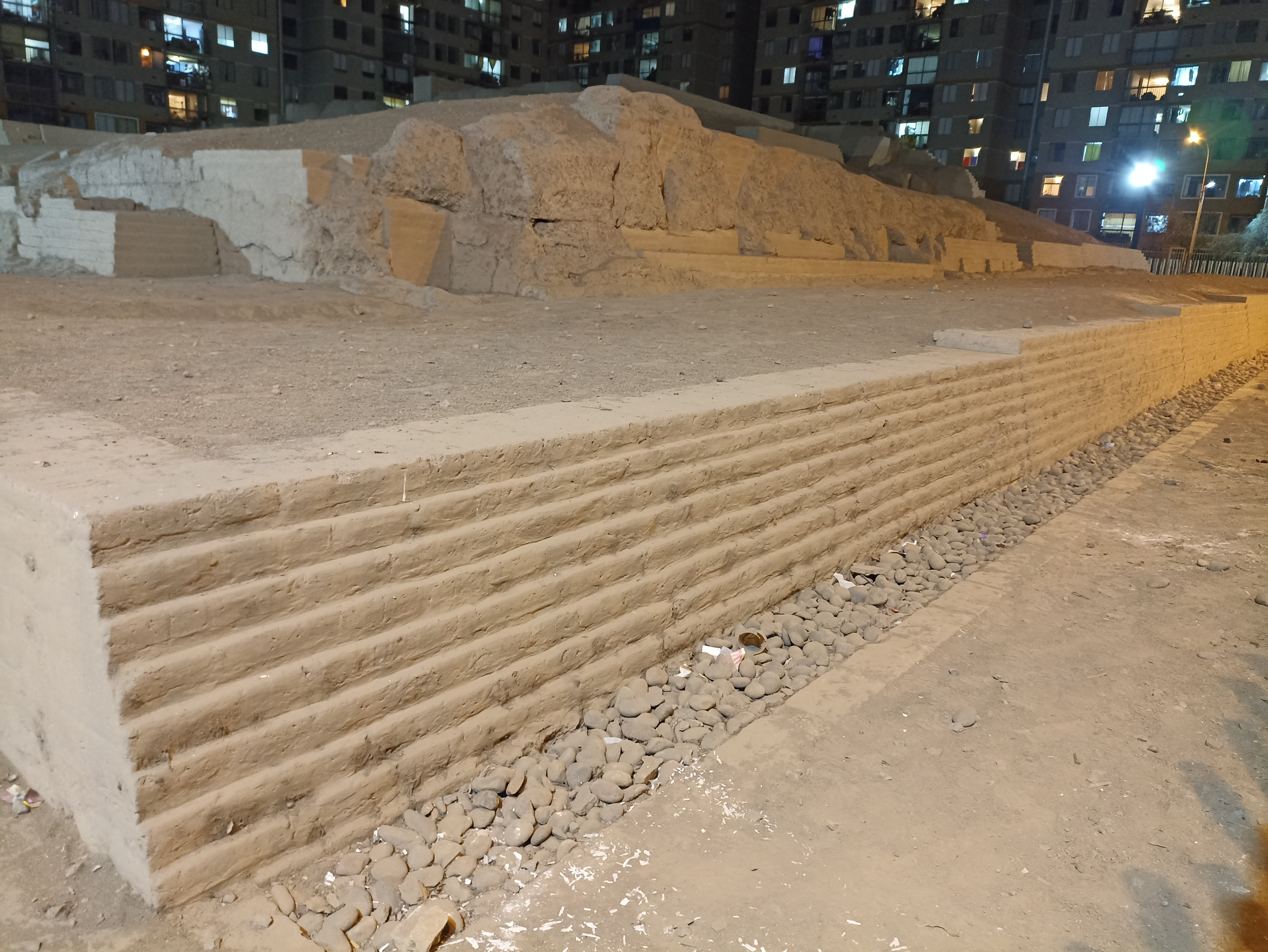
Close-up of a side wall of the Huaca Huantinamarca. It shows the technique used to build it

=== Pre-Columbian period (until 1532 AD) ===
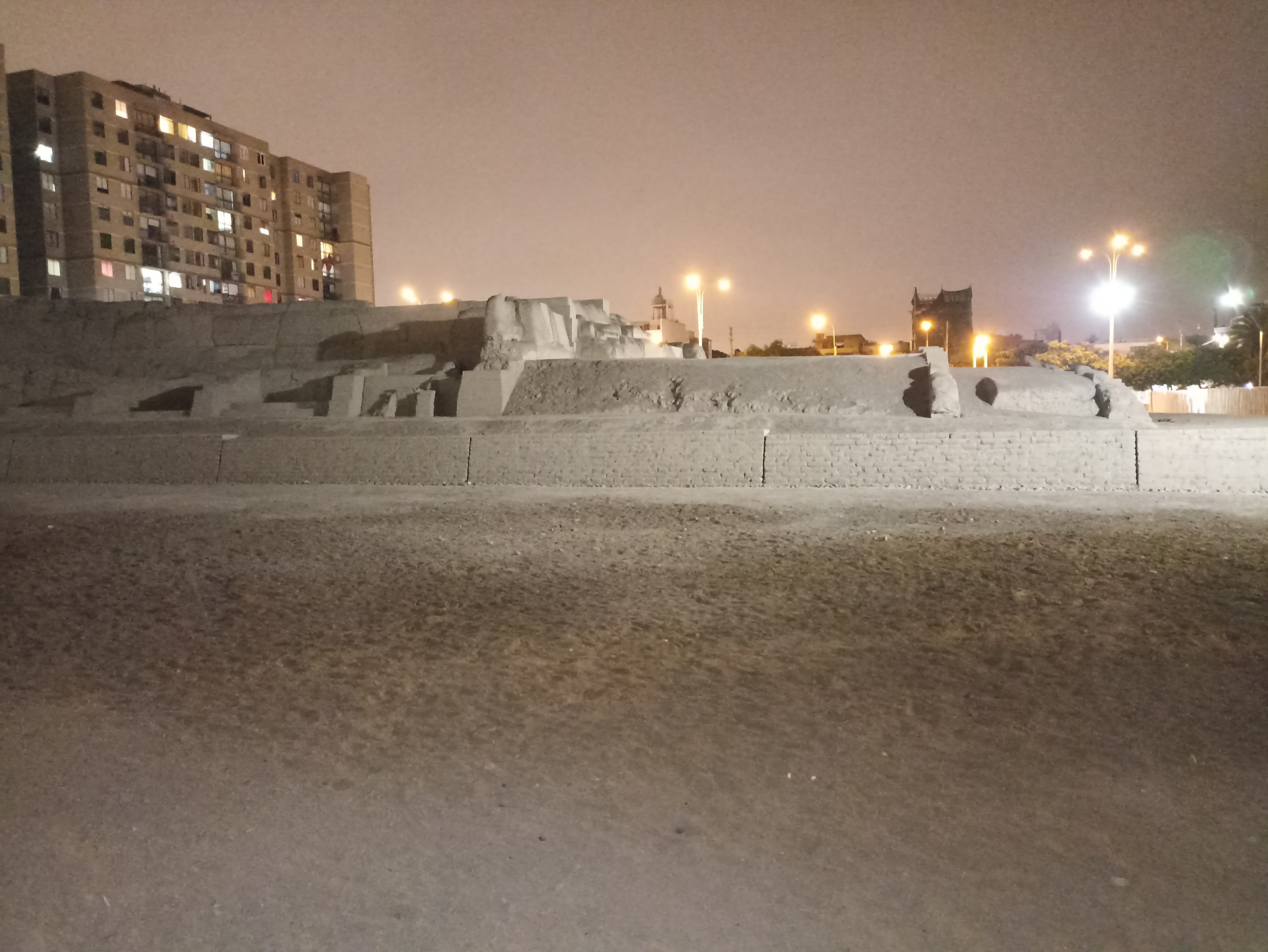
View in the distance of structures where the various elements for rituals were stored in pre-Columbian times

The Huaca Huantinamarca Research, Conservation and Restoration Project (PIACRHH, 2009–2010) identified at least two fundamental phases in its construction. During the first phase, walls of various sizes were built, with predominance of walls 40 and 80 cm thick, using a technique known as formwork, with the surface smoothed by hand as known from the presence of finger and hand marks on these walls. In the second phase, walls with blocks of regular dimensions, a section of which displays a trapezoidal form (3.5 meters at the base and 1.2 meters at the top superior), which are more structurally stable, were used. They have lost their original coating today.

Huantinamarca was part of the Maranga complex, and served as the main seat of a community, integrated into the productive and ritual chain linked to the collection, transformation, and consumption of corn chicha used in celebrations and rituals associated with the agricultural calendar.

Fragmented ceramic material, vessels and funerary offerings found during excavations are related to the late Ichma period, and some have Chancay and Chimu influence. During excavations in 2010, 25 tombs were also found with around 100 human bodies, with hundreds of ceramic vessels and textiles. In addition, this huaca was also linked to productive tasks, religious worship, public congregation and as a cemetery.

The architectural evidence shows that the last phase of occupation of Huantinamarca corresponds to the Late Horizon period (1476 AD to 1532 AD), a time when the Incas occupied the central coast.

=== Colonial period (1532 AD to 1821 AD) ===
At the end of the pre-Columbian period, the building was converted into a mausoleum. Later, in colonial times, it was used as a place to exercise water control for the existing irrigation systems in the areas and, due to its elevation, for sightseeing, as nearby crops could be observed and the sea horizon could be seen, warning of possible pirate incursions.

During this period, Huantinamarca was adapted and transformed by the Spanish for their own use. Archaeological evidence has been found in the southwestern part of the platform, consisting of type A polychrome Panama style ceramics (plates, cups, bowls and pots ), a leather shoe, a glass bead, a playing card and, in funerary context 22, an individual with sharp wounds on his left arm.

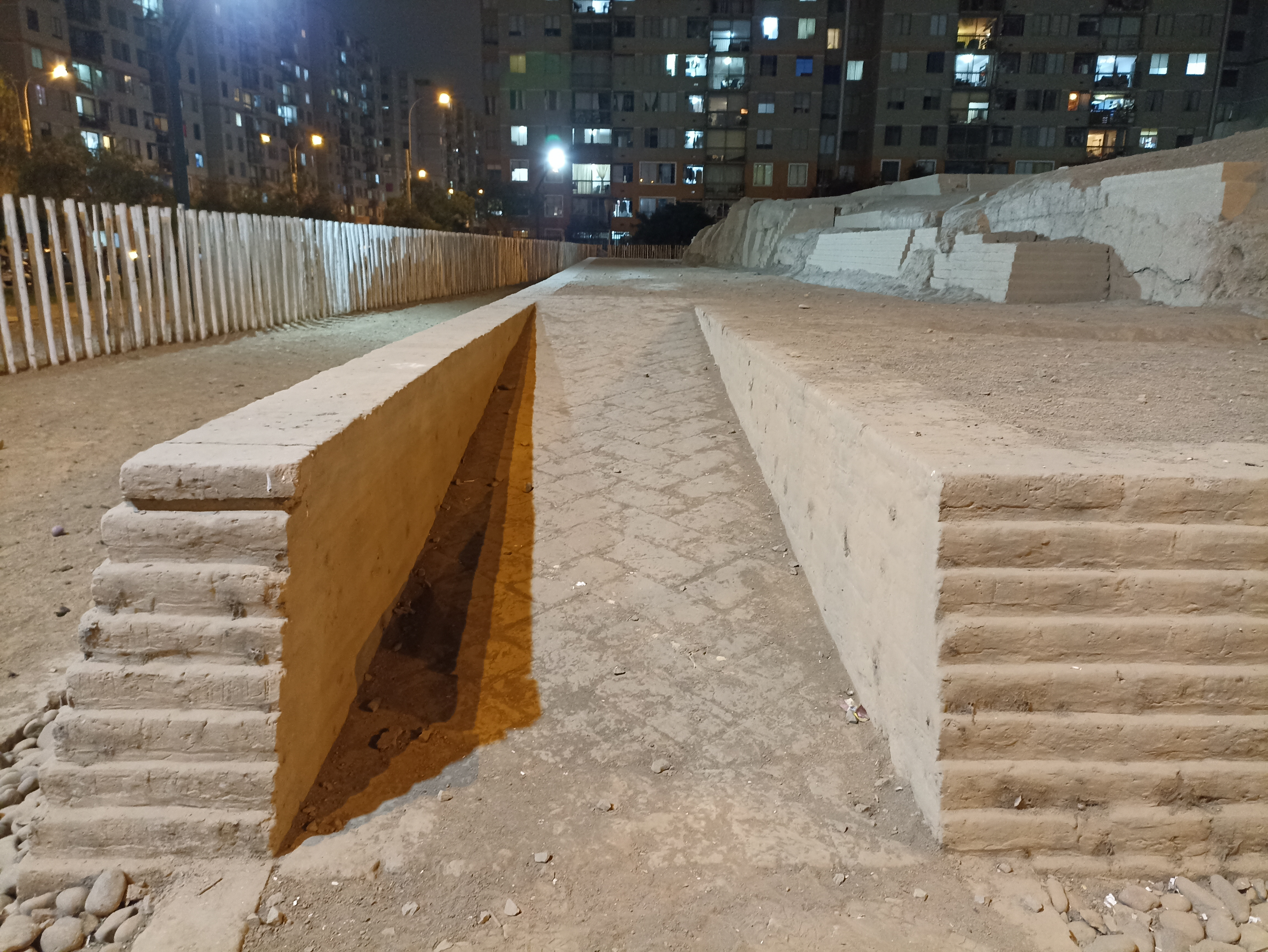
Entrance ramp that served as access to the Huaca Huantinamarca.

=== Modern period (1822 AD to present) ===
Evidence of rituals such as “payments to the land” or the burials of offerings during this period have been found. These practices are directly related to shamanistic rituals carried out in archaeological sites due to the belief that the magic, power and sacredness they seek are still found in those places.

During the urban development process in the district of San Miguel in the 20th century, various individuals, public and private entities acquired large parcels of land for residential, commercial and institutional use. As a result, from the 1960s Huantinamarca was part of the property where the Pacific Commercial Fair was organized, and later was even part of the stage at the Home Fair for concerts and other presentations. This protected Huantinamarca from destruction as it was not included in the urban development that took place in the last part of the 20th century in the area. Subsequently, once the property became a residential area, Huaca Huantinamarca became the central part of the Condominium ”Parques de la Huaca".

== Huaca Huantinamarca today ==
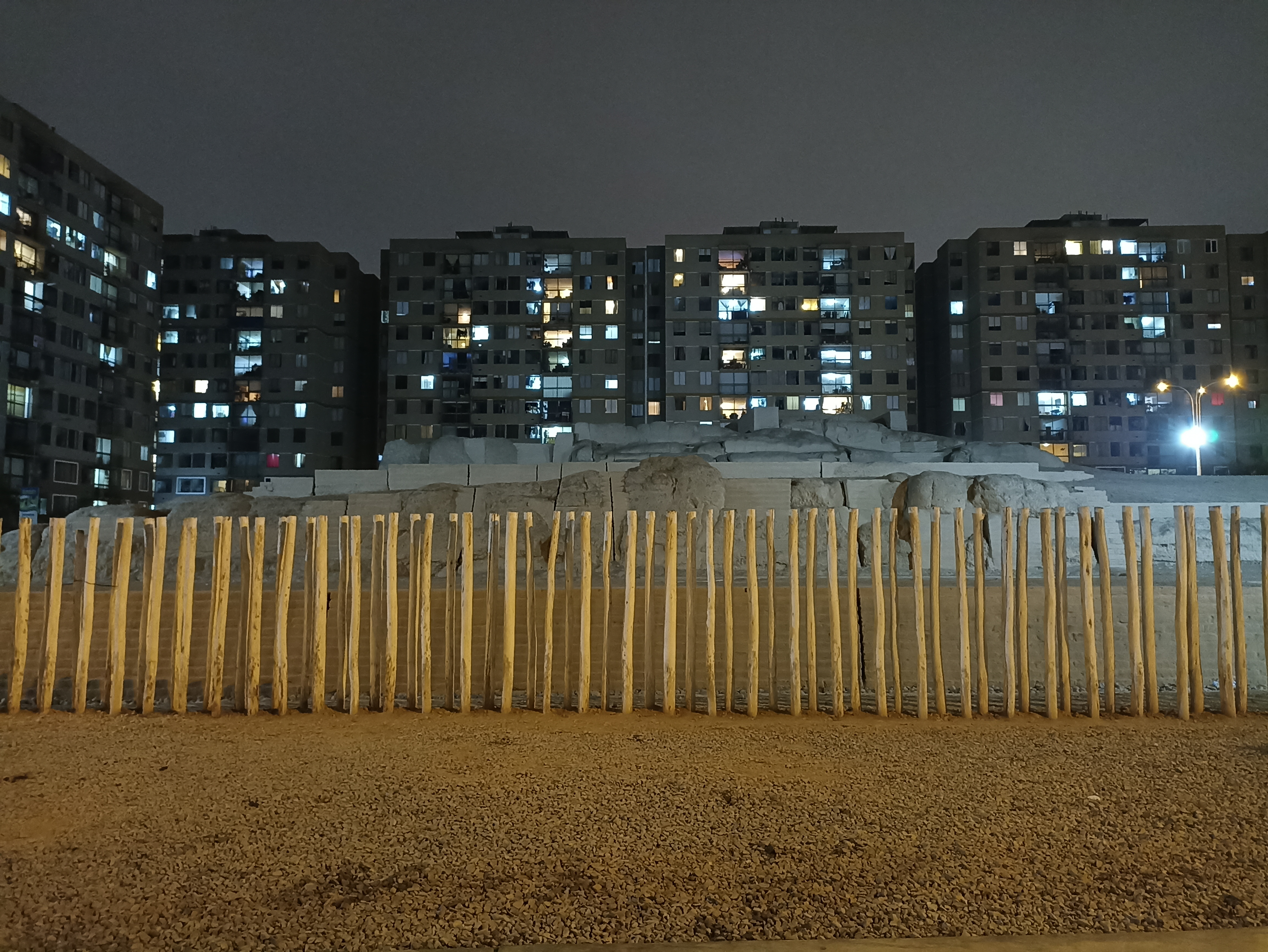
Contrast between the pre-Columbian world and the modern world. The use of the Huaca as the central axis of the condominium ”Parques de la Huaca"

=== Deterioration ===
The studies and reconstruction projects that took place in sites such as Huallamarca, Huaca Pucllana and Puruchuco helped the public and the authorities change the perception of these sites as places that could potentially be demolished, as well as on the prehistoric societies that built them. Huantinamarca was an abandoned place and in deterioration but thanks to a modern vision it could be recovered.

=== Real estate project ===
In May 2009, the construction of the condominium called «Parques de la Huaca» began, which is the official name of the urban project in Huantinamarca.

The current form of Huantinamarca is the result of the work of a multidisciplinary team consisting of archaeologists, architects, landscape experts and restorers, in which the iconography of textiles encountered in the area, the vegetation and the visual impact were considered as a reference for the design.

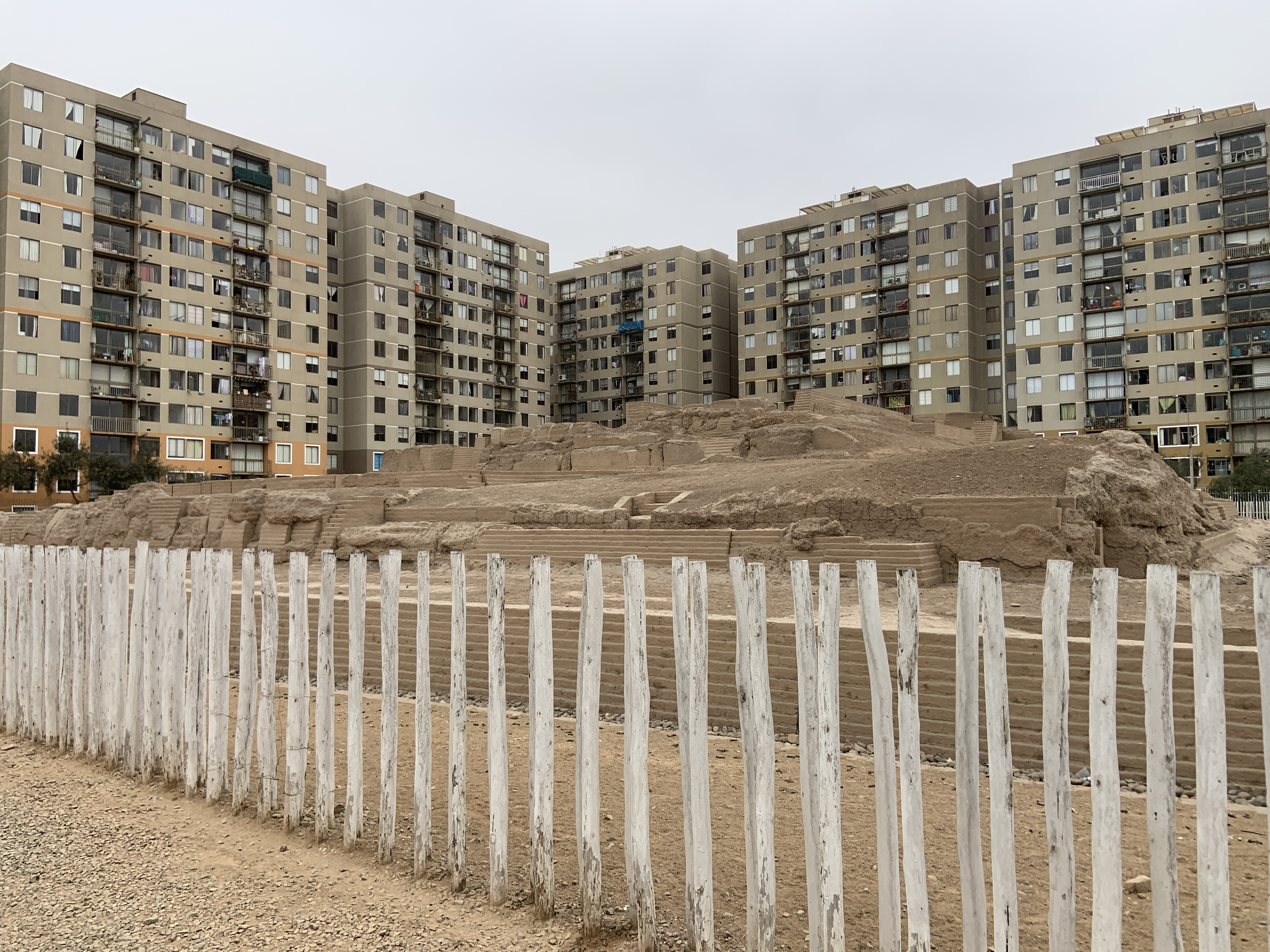
Huaca Huantinamarca in October 2022

=== Current situation ===
The Huantinamarca real estate project has achieved the goal that the monument be part of the daily life of the people who reside in the housing complex, and that they have an emotional relationship with it. In this respect, Huantinamarca is an example of how real estate and construction companies need to take care of and enhance the cultural heritage of the nation.

== See also ==
- Huaca Casa Rosada
