= Pachacamac =

Archaeological site in Peru

Pachacámac
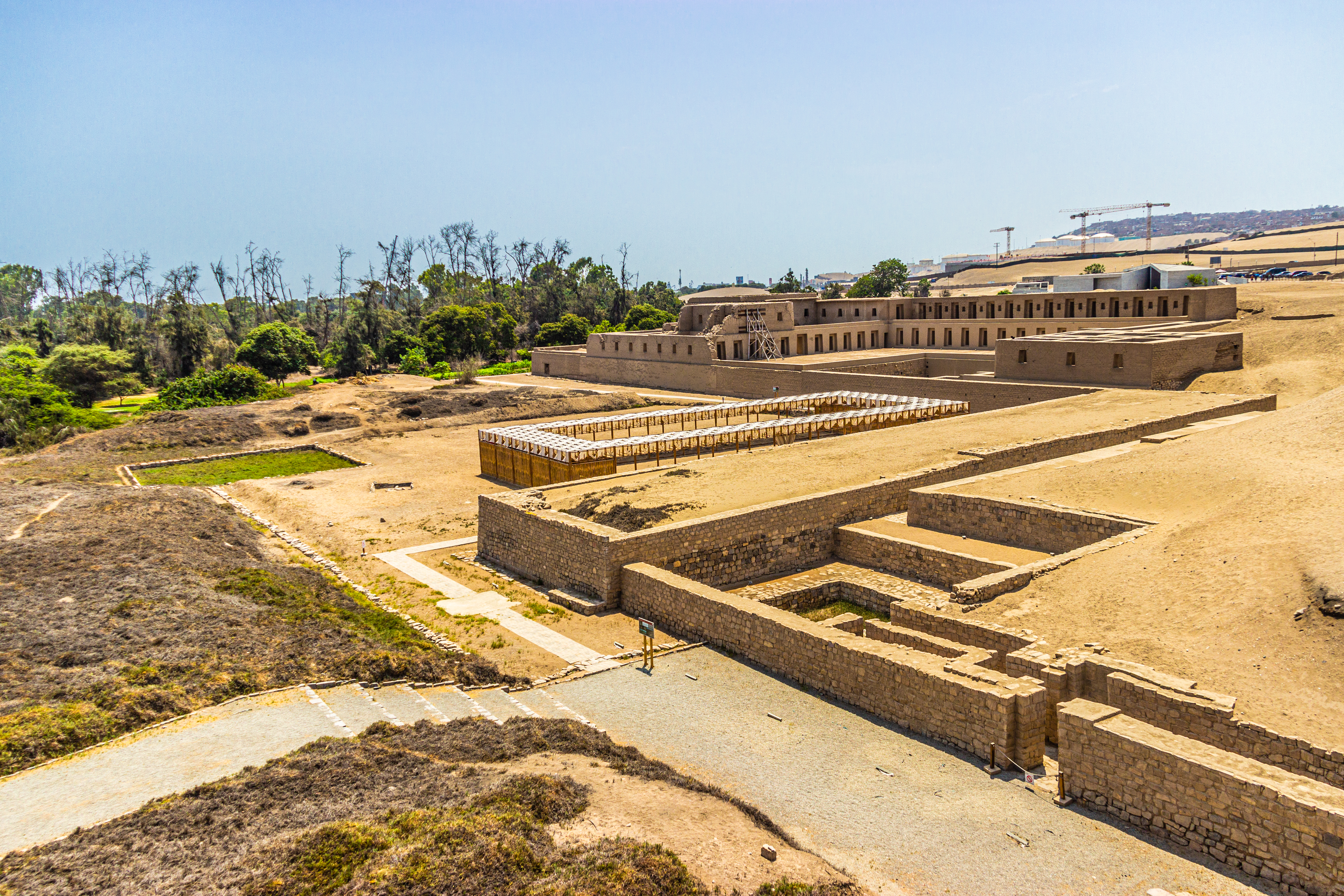
- View of Pachacámac

- Location within Peru
- 12°15′24″S 76°54′01″W
- Periods: Middle Horizon, Late Intermediate, Late Horizon
- Cultures: Huari, Lima, Inca Empire
- Location: Peru; Lima

Site notes
- Website: Santuario Arqueológico Pachacámac (in Spanish)

Cultural Heritage of Peru
- Official name: Iglesia y Convento de Santo Domingo
- Type: Immovable tangible
- Designated: 7 September 2006; 20 years ago
- Legal basis: R.D. Nº 1416

Pachacámac (Quechua: Pachakamaq) is an archaeological site 40 kilometres (25 mi) southeast of Lima, Peru in the Valley of the Lurín River. The site was first settled around A.D. 200 and was named after the "Earth Maker" creator god Pacha Kamaq. The site flourished for about 1,300 years until the Spanish invaded. Pachacamac covers about 600 hectares (1480 acres) of land.

== Pacha Kamaq deity ==
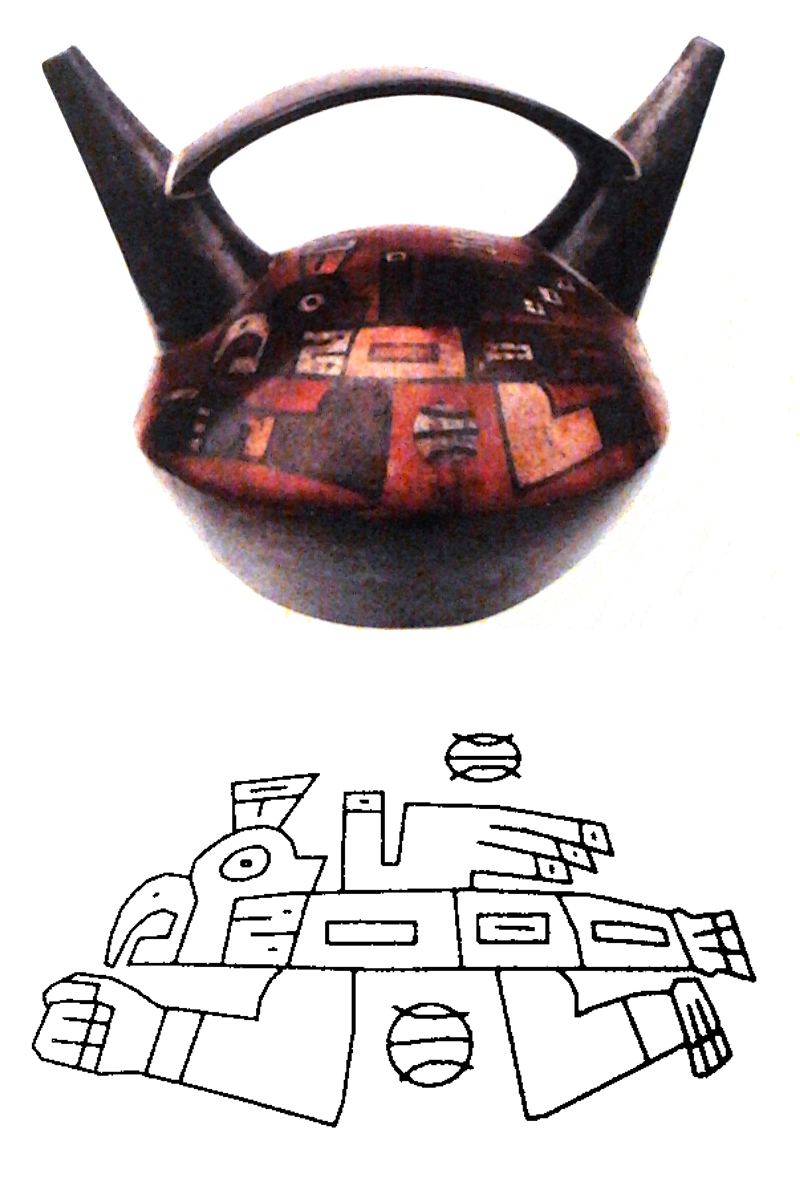
anthropomorphic bird on a Huari pot

Pacha Kamaq ('Earth-Maker') was considered the creator god by the people who lived in this part of Peru before the Inca conquest. The Inca received him into their pantheon, but he was never an equal of Viracocha, whom they viewed as more powerful.

15th century Ychsma textile, from Peru's central coast

The myths that survive of Pacha Kamaq are sparse and confused: some accounts, for example, identify him as Manco Cápac's cowardly brother Ayca, while others say that he, Manco Cápac and Viracocha were the sole three sons of Inti, the sun god. Another story says that he made the first man and the first woman, but forgot to give them food – and when the man died and the woman prayed over Pachacamac's head, to his father Inti to make her the mother of all the peoples of earth, Pachacamac was furious. One by one, as the children were born, he tried to kill them – only to be beaten and to be thrown into the sea by her hero-son Wichama, after which Pachacamac gave up the struggle and contented himself by becoming the supreme god of fish.

== Pyramids of Pachacamac ==
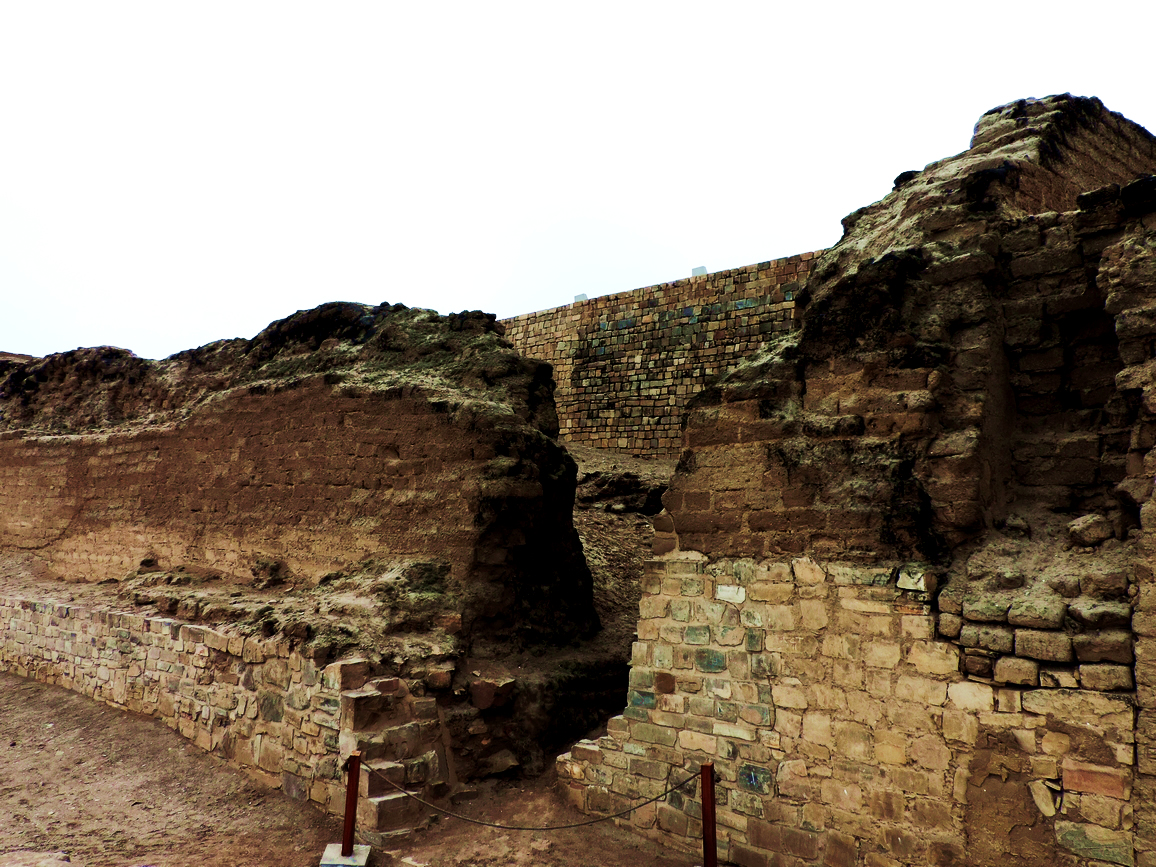
Pachacamac ruins, 2014

In the 1890s archaeologists first began exploring Pachacamac. They found many enormous buildings and burial sites that had been previously looted. The first (sacred) section of the site includes temples of religious significance and a large cemetery. The second section includes several buildings which are mainly secular pyramids. In this complex of buildings there were mud-brick stepped pyramids with ramps and plazas. These buildings are dated between the late 1300s and the mid-1400s.

The three most famous pyramids are all found in the sacred sector (the first sector). These are the Painted Temple, the Temple of the Sun, and the Old Temple of Pachacamac.

According to Peter Eekhout, an archaeologist who studied and excavated the site of Pachacamac, "For decades most scholars thought the pyramids (from the second section) were religious "embassies" that housed delegations from far-off communities who came to worship, bring tribute, and make offerings to Pachacamac". However, Eekhout came to a different conclusion after his work at the site. Eekhout and his team found that the structures lacked the features that characterized religious centers of the time. He concluded that the structures were used as palaces for the Ychsma (EESH-ma), the rulers of Pachacamac.

=== Pachacamac Idol ===
In 1938, an archaeologist found a 7.6-foot-long (2.34 meters) idol, which has a diameter of 5.1 inches (13 centimeters), at the Painted Temple, an object that was allegedly destroyed by Hernando Pizarro. Carbon-14 dating found that the idol dated to about A.D. 760 to 876, the time of the Wari Empire and that it had once been painted with cinnabar.

=== Temple of the Sun ===
The Temple of the Sun (seen below) is 30,000 m^{2} in size and is in the shape of a trapezoid. It has the common step pyramid architecture which forms terraces around the structure. This temple has been dated to the time of Inca control over Pachacamac. Some archaeologists believe human sacrifices may have taken place at this the Temple. Sacrifices of women and children were found in an Inca cemetery within a portion of the structure. Burial goods found with the sacrifices point to the sacrifices originating from coastal societies. Unfortunately archaeologists are limited in their knowledge of this site because the Temple of the Sun and many other pyramids at Pachacamac have been irreversibly damaged by looting and the El Niño weather phenomenon.

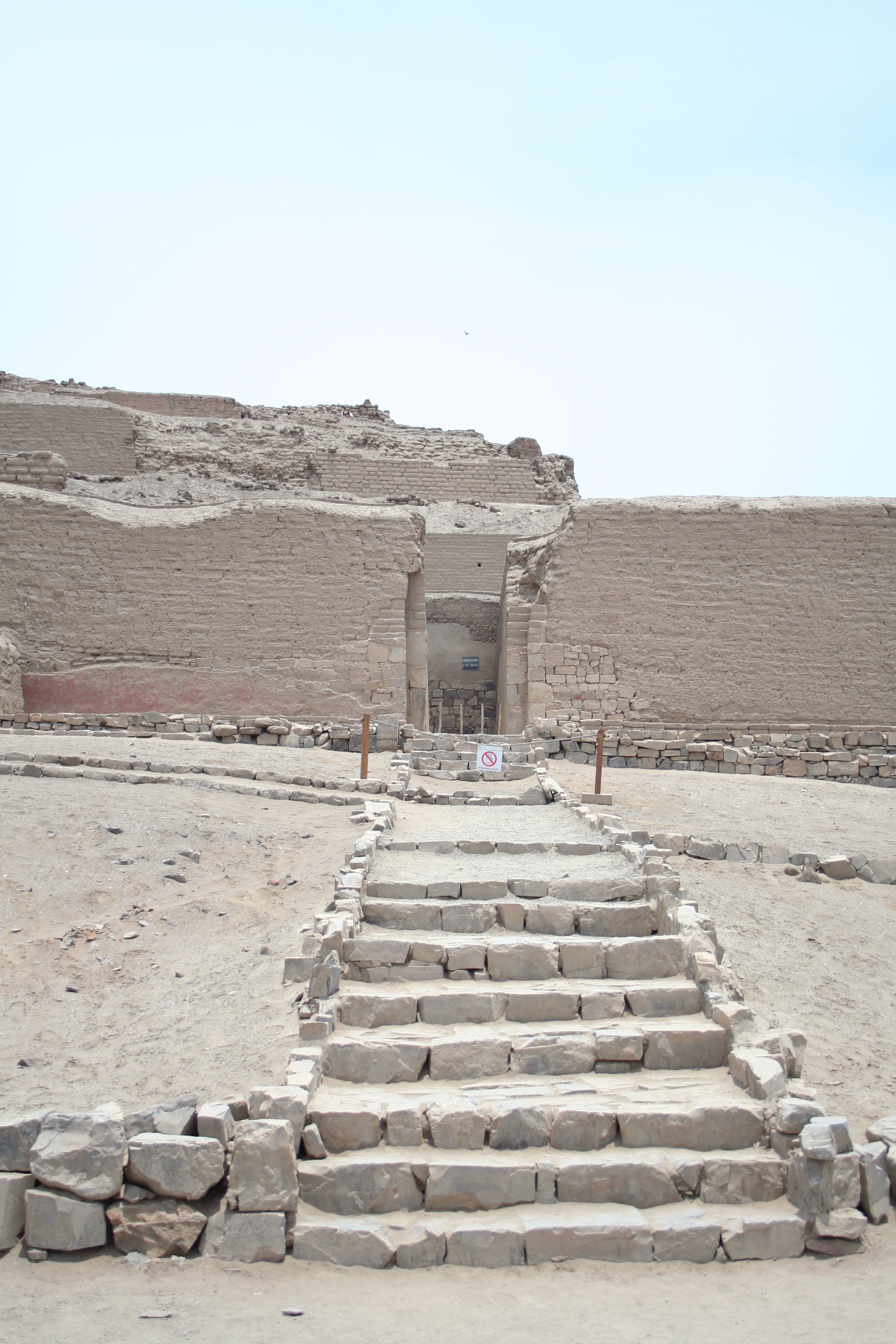
Main entrance of the Temple of the Sun (Templo del Sol)

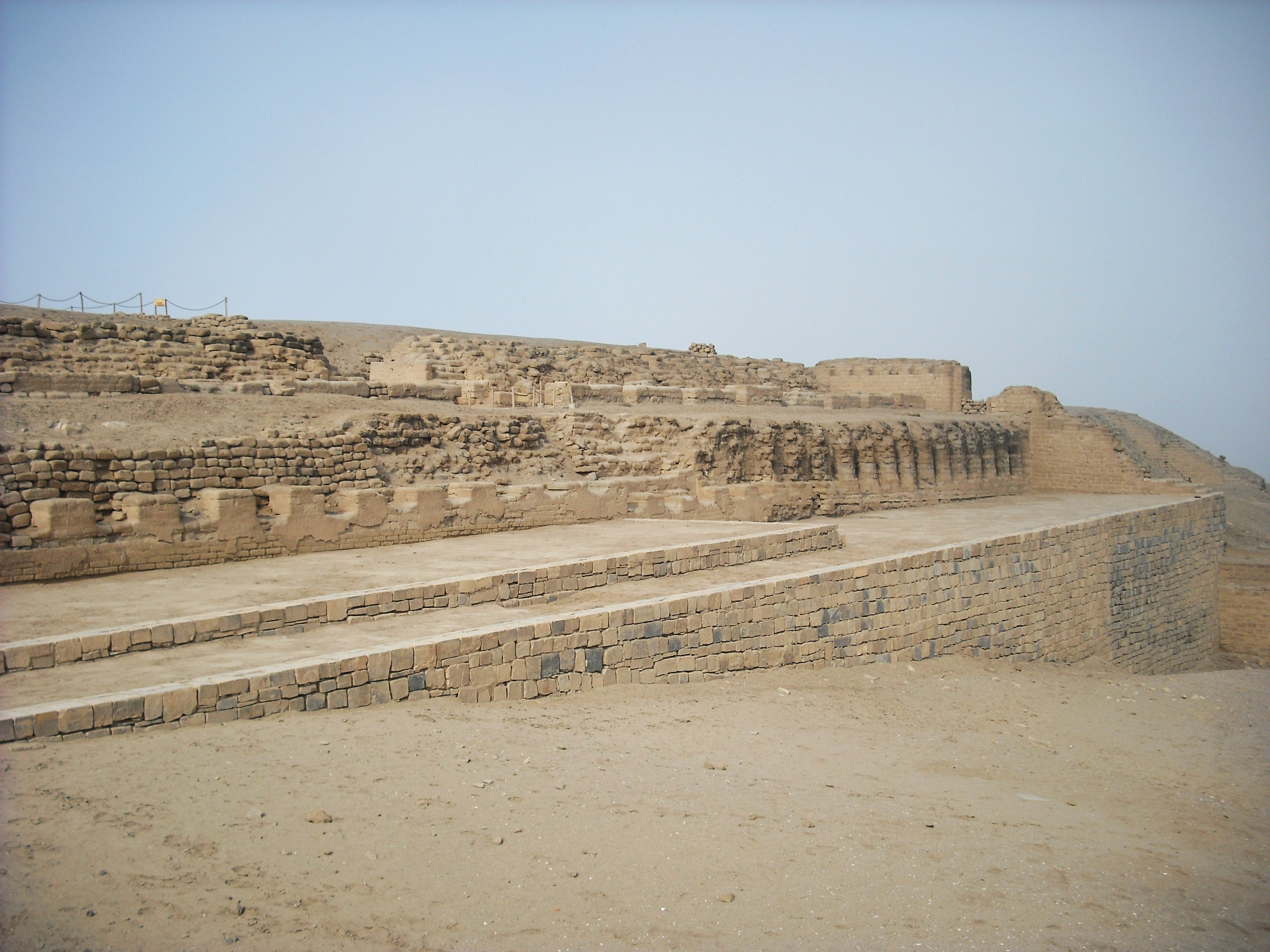
The front side (facing the sea) of the Temple of the Sun

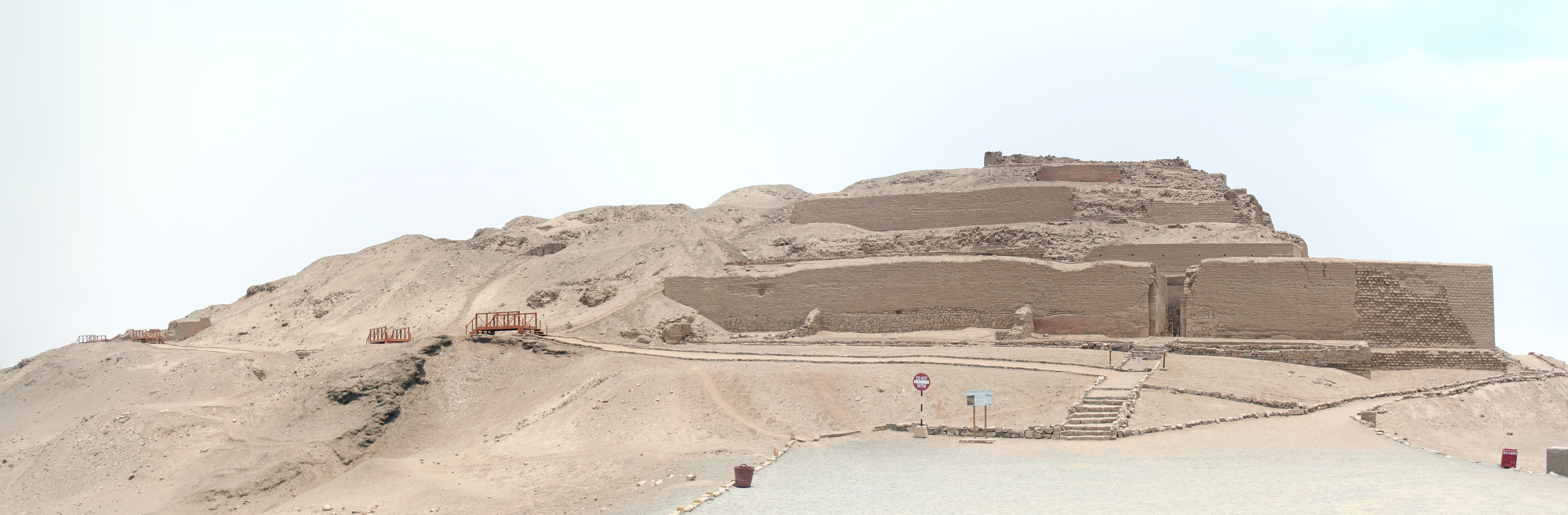
Southern side of the Temple of the Sun

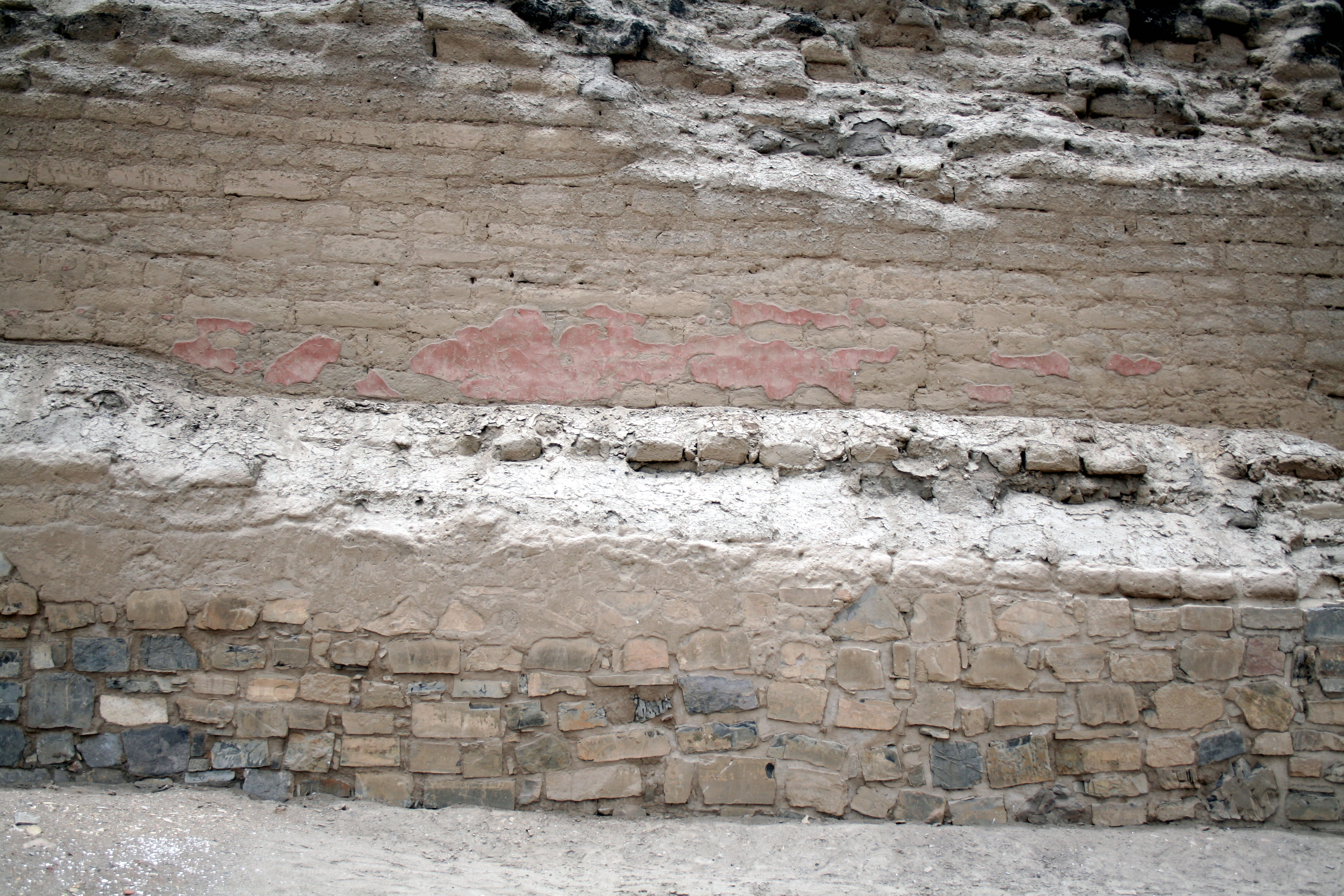
More walls of the Temple of the Sun

=== Old Temple ===
The Old Temple, also called the Temple of Pachacamac, is the oldest building in Pachacamac. It is built on a rocky promontory and is characterized by the massive use of small bricks of raw adobe dated to the Early Intermediate period, under the influence of the Lima culture (3rd to 7th centuries AD).

=== Other structures ===
Most of the common buildings and temples were built c. 800–1450 CE, shortly before the arrival and conquest by the Inca Empire.

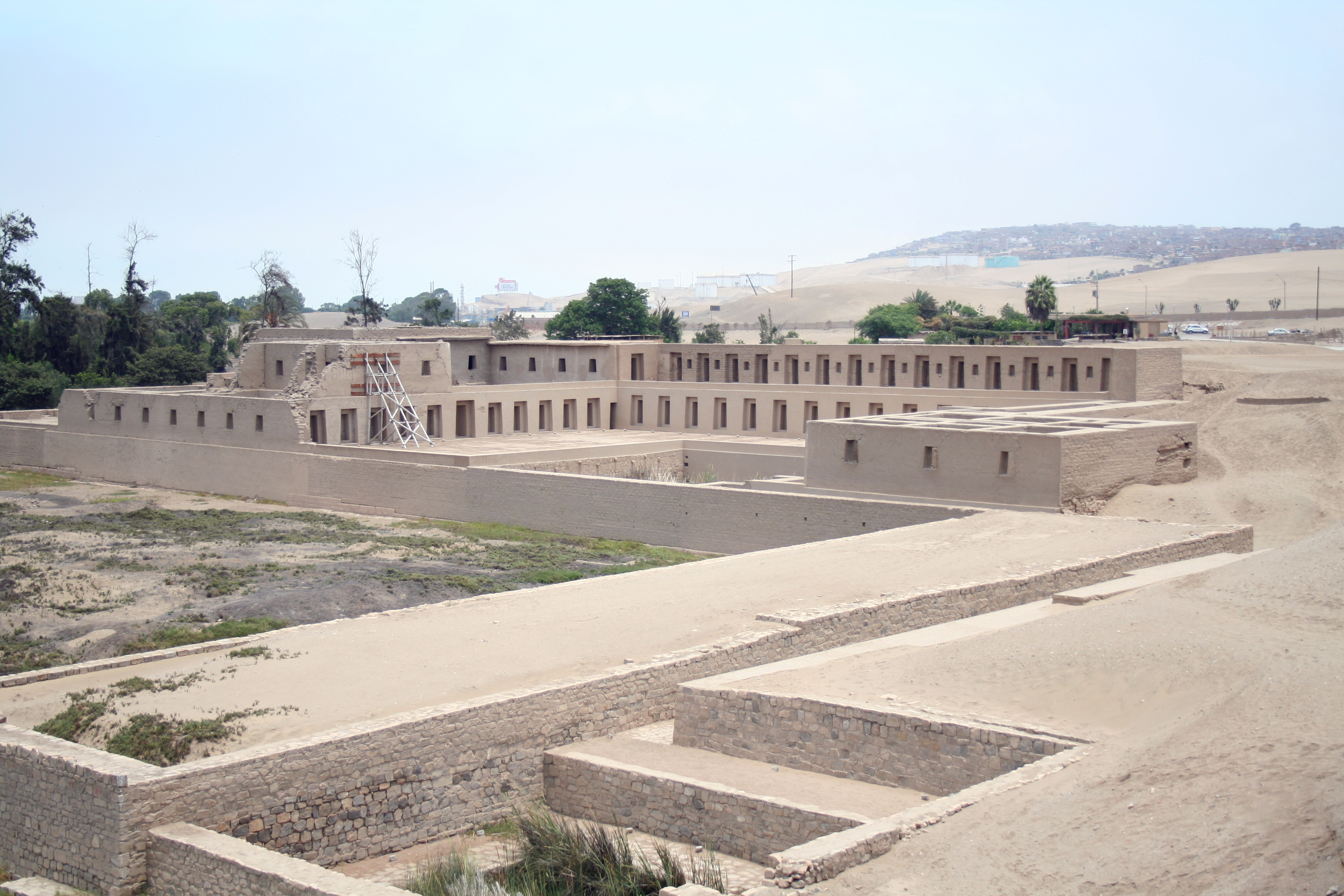
Mamacones Enclosure (Recinto de Mamacones)

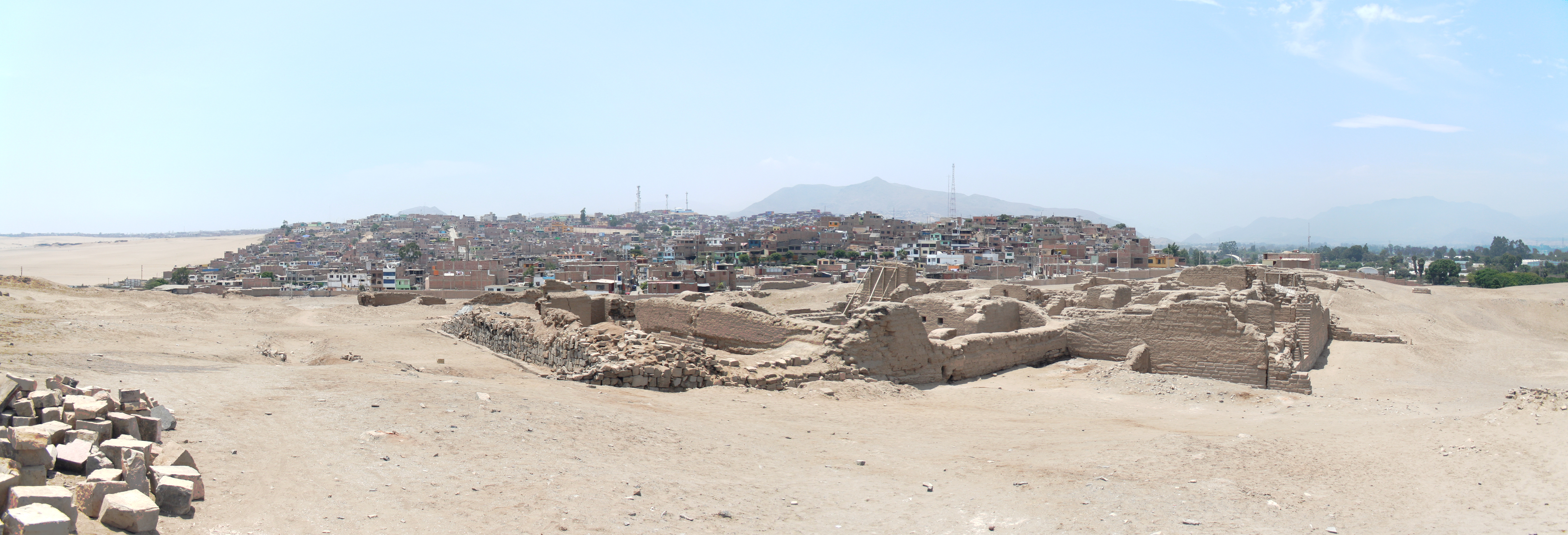
Tauri Chumbi Palace

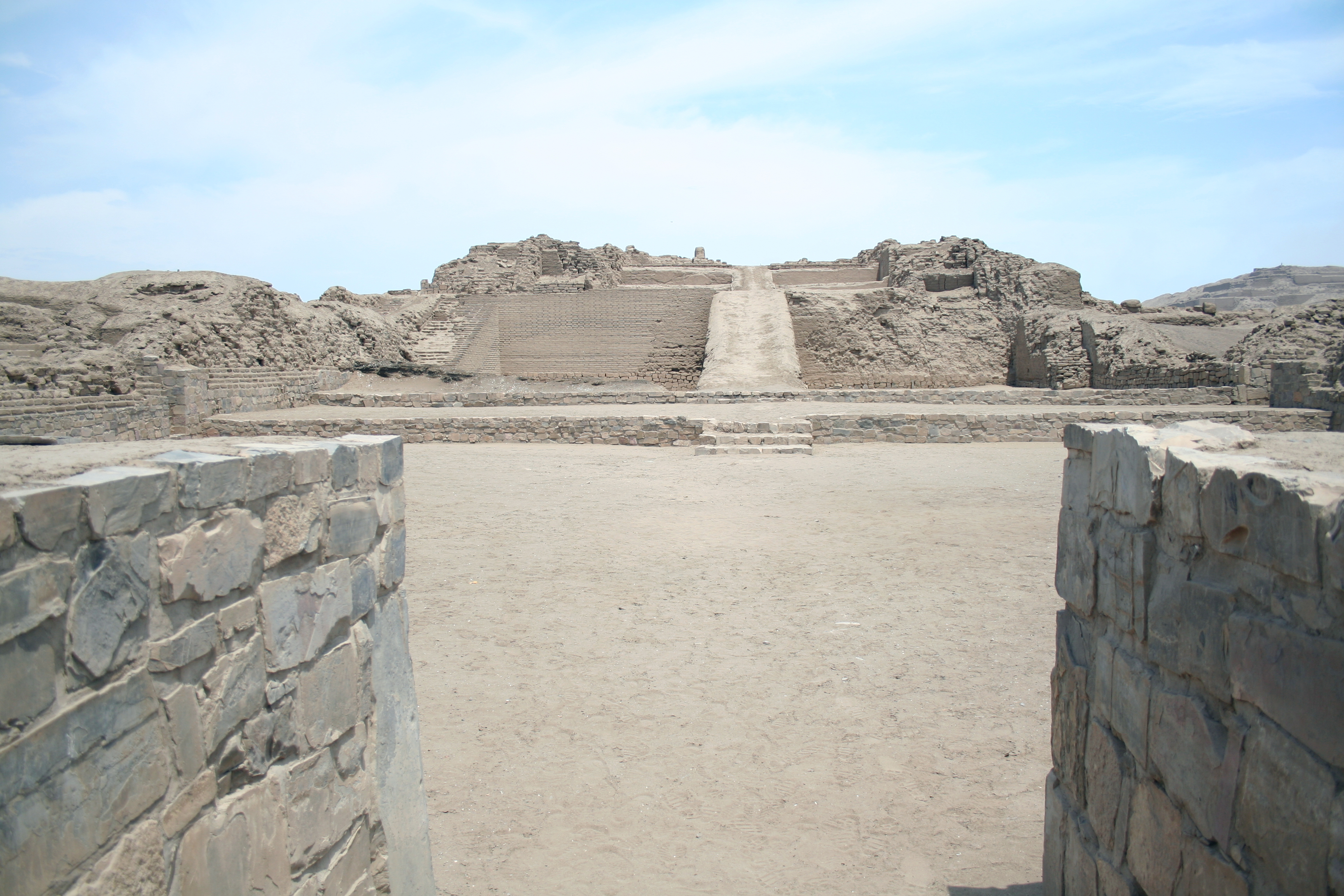
Pyramid with ramp

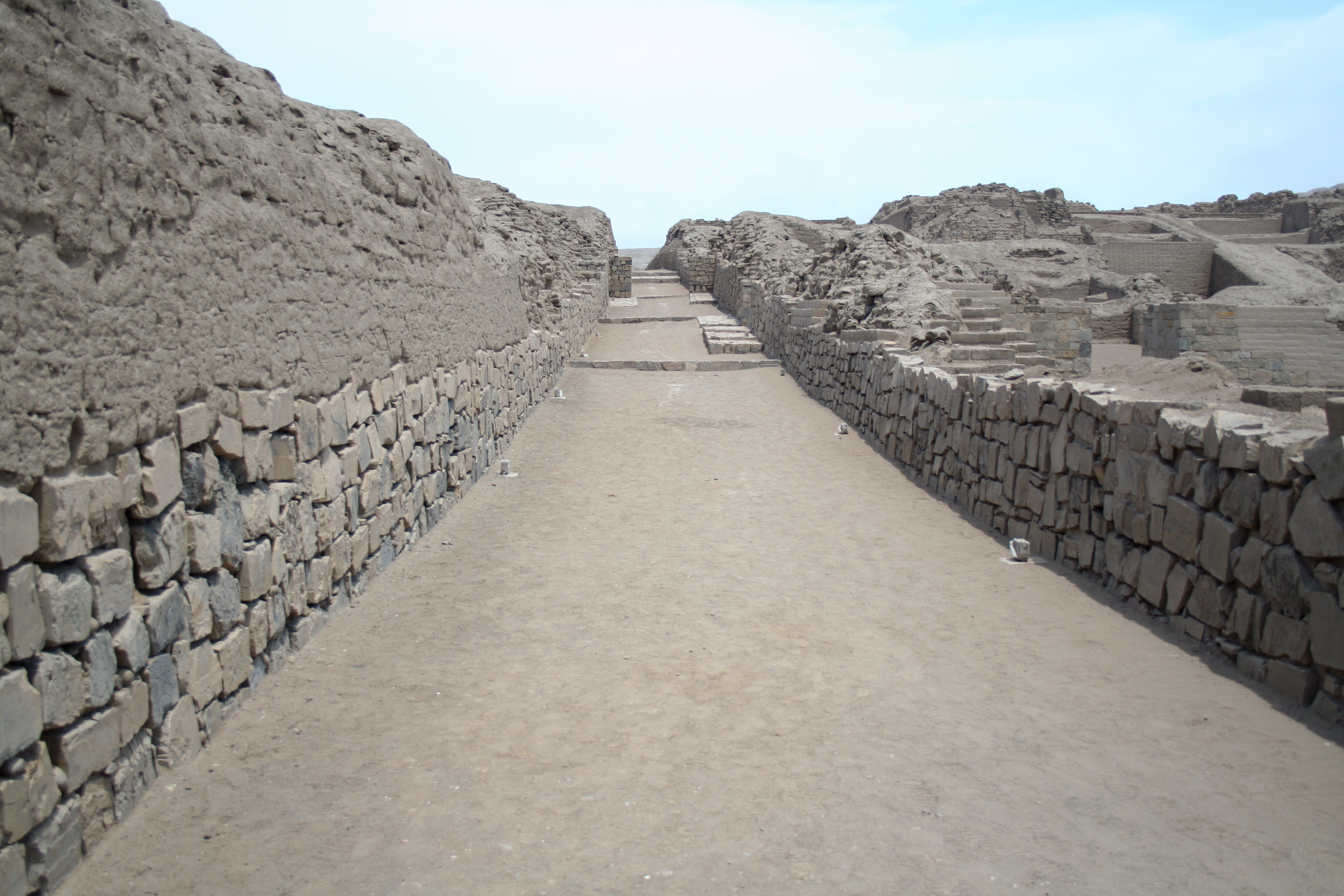
Calle Norte Sur (street)

=== Grave sites ===
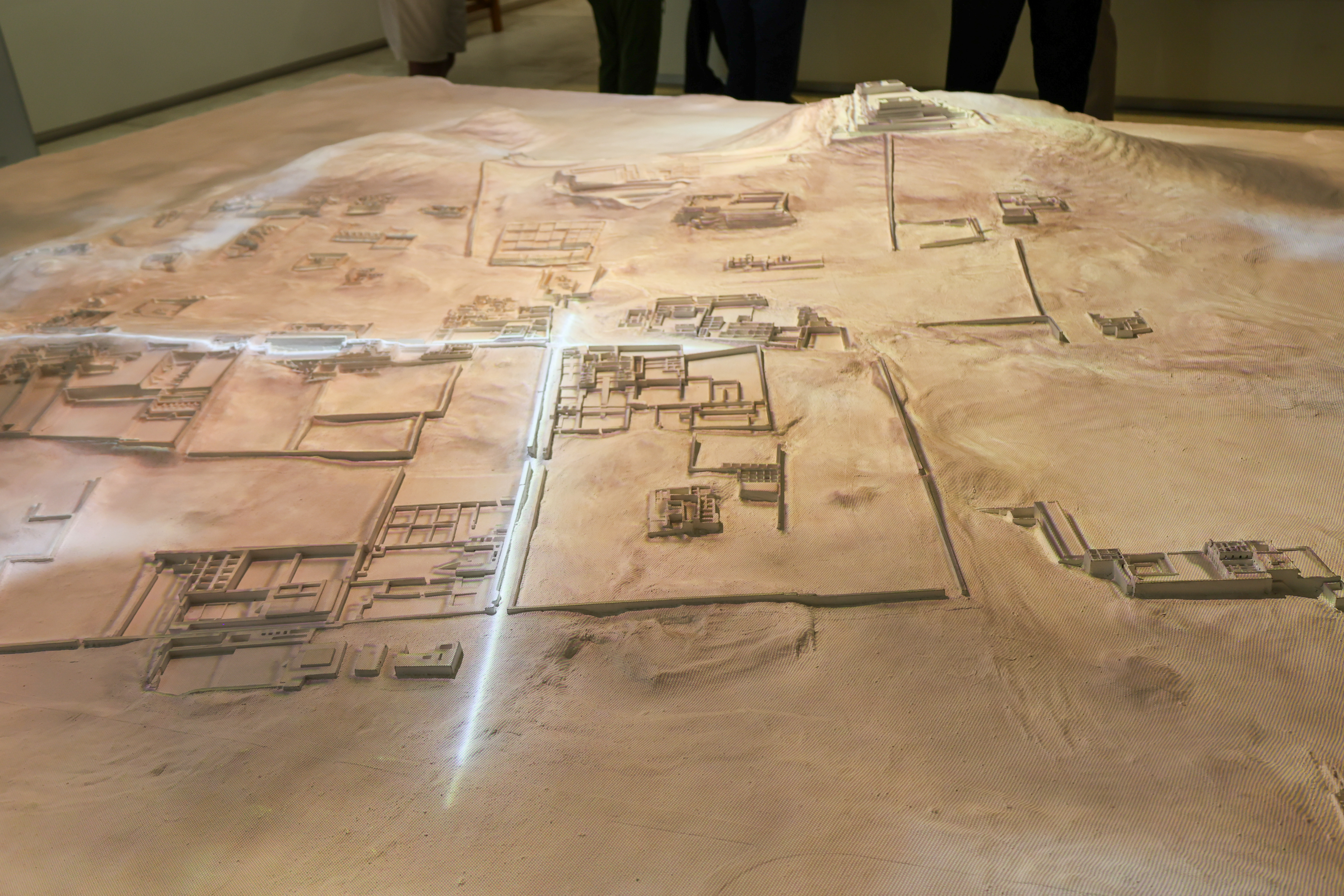
Model of Pachacamac

Archaeologists have uncovered multiple grave sites. These sites may date to different periods of Pachacamac's history are located in different parts of the city. In the Southeastern part area, in the Temple of Inti (The Inca Sun God), archeologists have found a cemetery that was set apart for the mamacuna (Virgins for the Sun), women who had important status. These women wove textiles for priests, and brewed corn beer which was used in Inca festivals. The women were sacrificed in the highest ritual. They were strangled with cotton garrote – some women still had the cotton twisted around their neck when their bodies were discovered – then wrapped in fine cloth and buried in stone tombs. Each was surrounded by offerings from the highlands of Peru, such as coca, quinoa, and cayenne peppers. In 2005, excavations in the Uhle Cemetery, located in front of the site's Painted Temple, uncovered an intact elite tomb belonging to the Ychsma culture. The chamber contained dozens of well-preserved funerary bundles, with the most prominent personages adorned with "false heads" and elaborate ornaments made from vibrant Amazonian parrot feathers. In 2012, Belgian archeologists found a 1,000 year-old tomb in front of Pachacamac containing over 80 skeletons and mummies, many of which were infants. The tomb contained offerings such as ceramic vessels, copper and gold alloy objects, wooden masks, and dogs and guinea pigs.

In 2019, archaeologists have found a 1,000 year-old cemetery in this area. Director of the Ychsma Project Professor Peter Eeckhout reported that the human remains were massively buried with various items and ceramics. Physical anthropologists headed by Dr. Lawrence Owens specified the mummies.

"Most of the people at the site had hard lives, with various fractures, bad backs, bad hips ... but the individuals from this cemetery show a higher than usual concentration of tuberculosis, syphilis, and really serious bone breaks that would have had major impacts on their lives. Still, the fact that most of these are healed – and that disease sufferers survived for a long time – suggests that they were being cared for, and that even in the sites' early history people felt a duty of care towards those less fortunate than themselves.".

== Outside influences ==
The Huari (c. 600–800 CE) reconstructed the city, probably using it as an administrative center. A number of Huari-influenced designs appear on the structures and on the ceramics and textiles found in the cemeteries of this period. After the collapse of the Huari empire, Pachacamac continued to grow as a religious center. The majority of the common architecture and temples were built during this later stage (c. 800–1450 CE).

The Ychsma maintained sophisticated, long-distance economic connections that extended far beyond the coastal region. Ancient DNA and stable isotope analyses of the feather ornaments recovered from elite tombs have revealed that the Ychsma acquired live, wild-caught macaws and Amazon parrots directly from the Amazon basin. These exotic birds were transported across the Andes and kept alive on the arid coast, evidencing a vast trans-Andean trade network that operated through direct routes or northern intermediaries, such as the Chimú, long before the Inca empire integrated the region.

The Inca Empire invaded Pachacamac and took over the site around 1470. For the Inca, Pachacamac was extremely important to religion as well as an important administration center. When the Inca started their conquest, they had their own creation god, Viracocha. However, out of respect for the religion of their conquered people, the Inca entered Pacha Kamaq into their religion, but Pacha Kamaq and Viracocha were not equals, Viracocha was believed to be more powerful. Still, Pachacamac was allowed an unusual amount of independence from the Inca Empire.

By the time the Tawantinsuyu (Inca Empire) invaded the area, the valleys of the Rímac and Lurín had a small state which the people called Ichma. They used Pachacamac primarily as a religious site for the veneration of Pacha Kamaq, the creator god. The Ichma joined the Incan Empire along with Pachacamac. The Inca maintained the site as a religious shrine and allowed the Pachacamac priests to continue functioning independently of the Inca priesthood. This included the oracle, whom the Inca presumably consulted. The Inca built five additional buildings, including a temple to the sun on the main square.

Archaeologists believe pilgrims may have played a part in life at Pachacamac for a couple of thousand years before the Inca claimed the site as part of their empire.

== Spanish invasion ==
At sites like Pachacamac, the Spanish used local resentment of the Inca as a tactic for overthrowing Inca rule.

After the Battle of Cajamarca, Francisco Pizarro sent his brother Hernando Pizarro, and fourteen horsemen, to Pachacamac to collect its gold riches. According to Cieza, the priests learned of the Spanish defilement of the Cuzco temple, and "ordered the virgin mamaconas to leave the Temple of the Sun", from where they say the priests also removed more than four hundred cargas of gold. They hid the treasures and it has not appeared to this day. Hernando departed Cajamarca on 5 January 1533, and returned on 14 April 1533, after defiling the temple. On the return trip through the Jauja Valley, he accepted the surrender of Chalcuchimac.

"In a few years the walls of the temple were pulled down by the Spanish settlers, who found there a convenient quarry for their own edifices."

== In popular culture ==
- Pachacamac was the name of the ship that carried the abducted Professor Calculus in The Seven Crystal Balls of The Adventures of Tintin. In the next book, Prisoners of the Sun, Pachacamac was the name of the Sun god worshiped by an ancient Incan tribe still active in South America. In the sixth book, The Broken Ear, a wooden head of Pachacamac is exhibited in the museum of Ethnography in Brussels.
- A character in the video game Sonic Adventure is named Pachacamac after the ancient ruin.
- Pachacamac was also the name of the main villain in Juken Sentai Gekiranger vs. Boukenger, a crossover direct-to-video movie.
- German group Alphaville included a song named "Girl from Pachacamac" in their 2003 album CrazyShow.

== See also ==
- Wari culture

== Bibliography ==
- Eeckhout, Peter (2005). "Ancient Peru's Power Elite". National Geographic. 207 (3): 52–57.
- De Cieza De León, Pedro. (1998) The Discovery and Conquest of Peru: Chronicles of the New World Encounter, Duke University Press, Durham and London.
- Van Stan, Ina. (1967) Textiles From Beneath the Temple of Pachacamac, Peru, The University Museum University of Pennsylvania, Philadelphia.
- Boone, Elizabeth and Tom Cummins. (1998) Native Traditions in the Postconquest World, Dumbarton Oaks, Washington, D.C.
- Ravines, Rogger. (1996) Pachacamac: Santuario Universal, Editorial Los Pinos E.I.R.L.
