= Huaca Casa Rosada =

Archaeological site in Peru

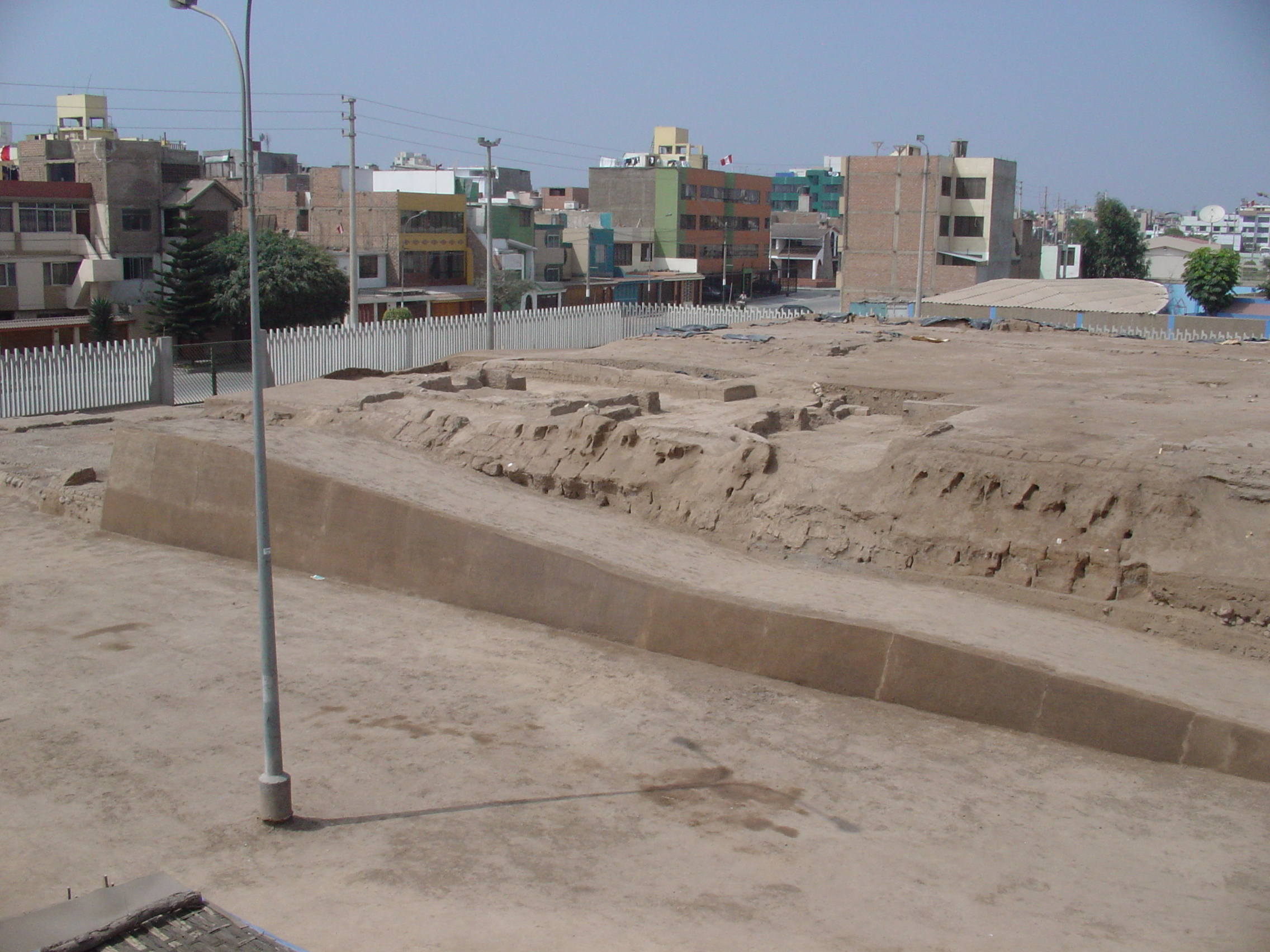
- Huaca Casa Rosada in 2004

- Location within Peru
- 12°04′54″S 77°05′15″W
- Type: Settlement
- Location: Lima
- Region: Lima

Huaca Casa Rosada is an archaeological site located in San Miguel District, in Lima, Peru, which occupies a total of 5300 square meters in the current urban area.

The site presents evidence of human occupation from the Intermediate period to the Inca period and remains from the Spanish colonial and Republican periods.

== Location ==
Huaca Casa Rosada is located between the streets Prolongación Cusco, pasaje Rosario Araoz and Prolongación Ayacucho in the district de San Miguel, in Lima, Peru.

== History ==
The archaeological site consists of a square-shaped structure of approximately 36 meters on each side and around 3 to 4 meters high, formed by rammed earth and adobe to build a platform. It presents occupations that go from the end of the Intermediate period to the Late period, passing through the Late Intermediate in which it belonged to the Maranga archaeological complex, subject to the Ichma Lordship. The use of the platform during this period is unknown.

Until the mid-1970s, Huaca Casa Rosada was located in a large crop field, and parallel to its north and west sides were irrigation ditches, which deteriorated the lower part of the huaca.

The huaca has structures with big adobes that were filled with earth and wall fragments to serve as the base for the house of Republican period, known as "Casa Rosada", made with Quincha and wood walls. This house had a square floor plan and its structure was made of posts on white oak and mulatto oak that probably came from Guayaquil, Ecuador, and included some minor pieces in huarango wood. Despite being a single-story construction, the quincha used was of the type used in constructions on the second and third levels. The exterior finish was made of a mud-based cake coated with pink-coloured paint.

Unfortunately, as a result of the urbanization of the area, known as "Urbanization Pando, second stage", the surrounding land was subdivided into new properties and for the construction of the new houses the beams and columns of the Casa Rosada were used as construction material, destroying totally the republican vestiges.

On December 4, 2003, through National Directorial Resolution No. 879, the National Institute of Culture (INC) declared Huaca Casa Rosada as Cultural Patrimony of the Nation.

In 2004, when Salvador Heresi was mayor of San Miguel district, the perimeter of the archaeological site was fenced and the site was cleaned and the walls consolidated. Despite being enclosed, Huaca Casa Rosada went through a period of neglect until July 2024, when, thanks to an initiative by a collective of local residents and with Eduardo Bless serving as mayor of San Miguel, the site underwent cleaning, lighting installation, and revitalization to serve as a venue for cultural activities.

== Findings ==
During the archaeological excavations carried out between 1973 and 1974, by the “Seminario de Arqueología” of the Pontifical Catholic University of Peru, fragments of turned and glazed pottery, earthenware and imported fine ceramics from the 16th-18th centuries were found. In particular, fragments of French earthenware, 5 mm thick, with floral motifs painted in fine lines in a blue tone on a white background were found. There were also abundant fragments of dark green and brown glass, made with the free-blown method, and green bottles of French wine. The vitrified ceramics presented multiple motifs in green and blue colors, similar to those found in the Huaca Palomino, and some in shades of brown and green with purple, unique in the Pando area. During excavations in the early 2000s, compartments made of rammed earth walls were found at the top of the building, below the Republican house, and the stairway leading from ground level to the top was determined to be of the colonial-republican period.

== Gallery ==
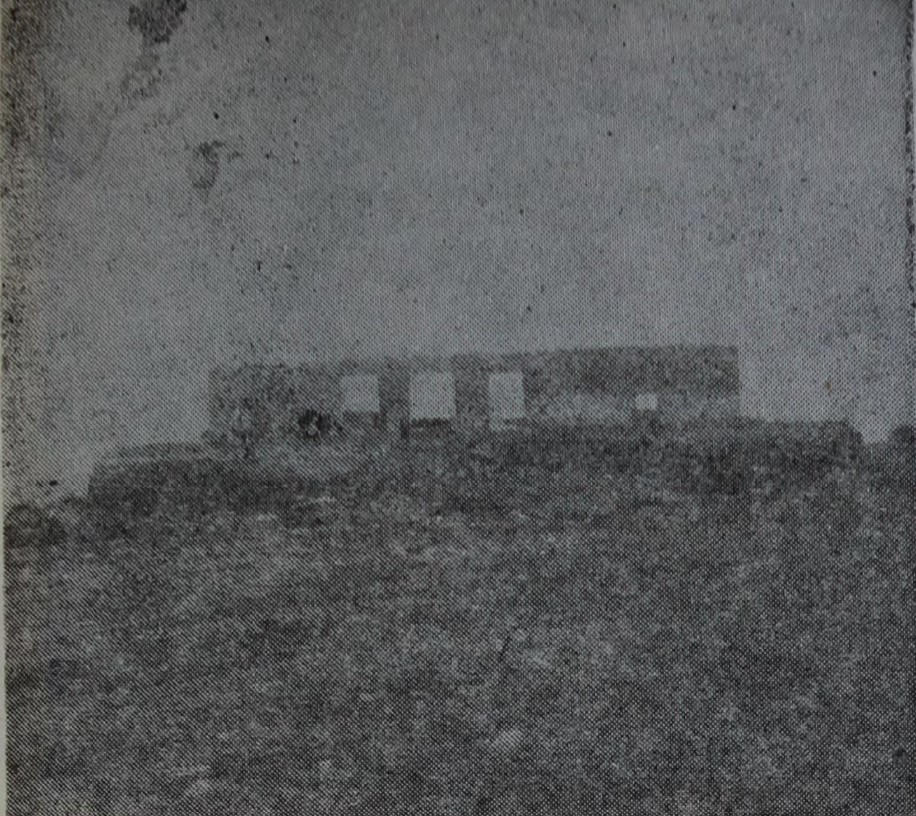
Huaca Casa Rosada in 1972 (photo PUCP)

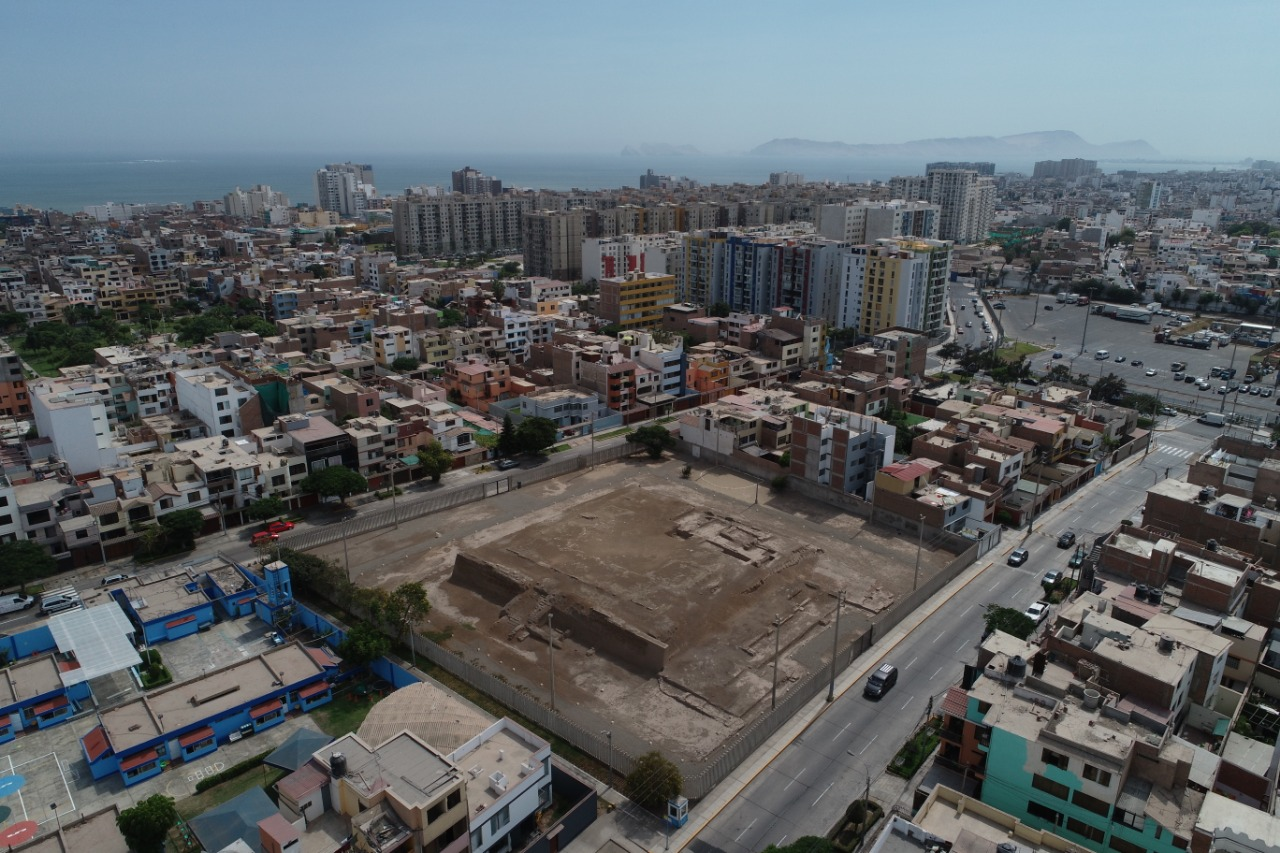
Huaca Casa Rosada in 2019

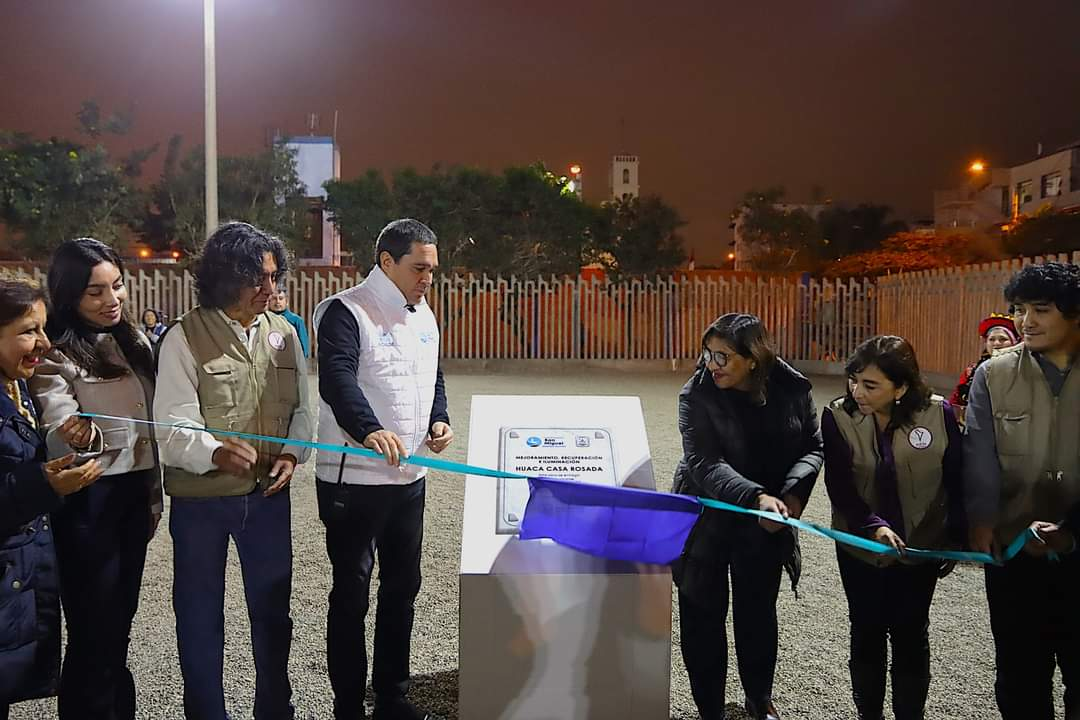
As a cultural venue in 2024

}

== See also ==
- Ministerio de Cultura del Perú. Huaca Casa Rosada en enero de 2015. http://www.arqueologiadigital.cultura.pe/ortofotos/casa-rosada
- Canal Patrimonio Monumental. Huaca Rosada en 2011. https://www.youtube.com/watch?v=hftaubd74Qo
- Municipalidad de San Miguel, Lima. Huacas del distrito. https://www.munisanmiguel.gob.pe/municipalidad-de-san-miguel/turismo/huacas/
