= Puruchuco =

Archaeological site in Peru

Coordinates: 12.0496°S 76.9361°W

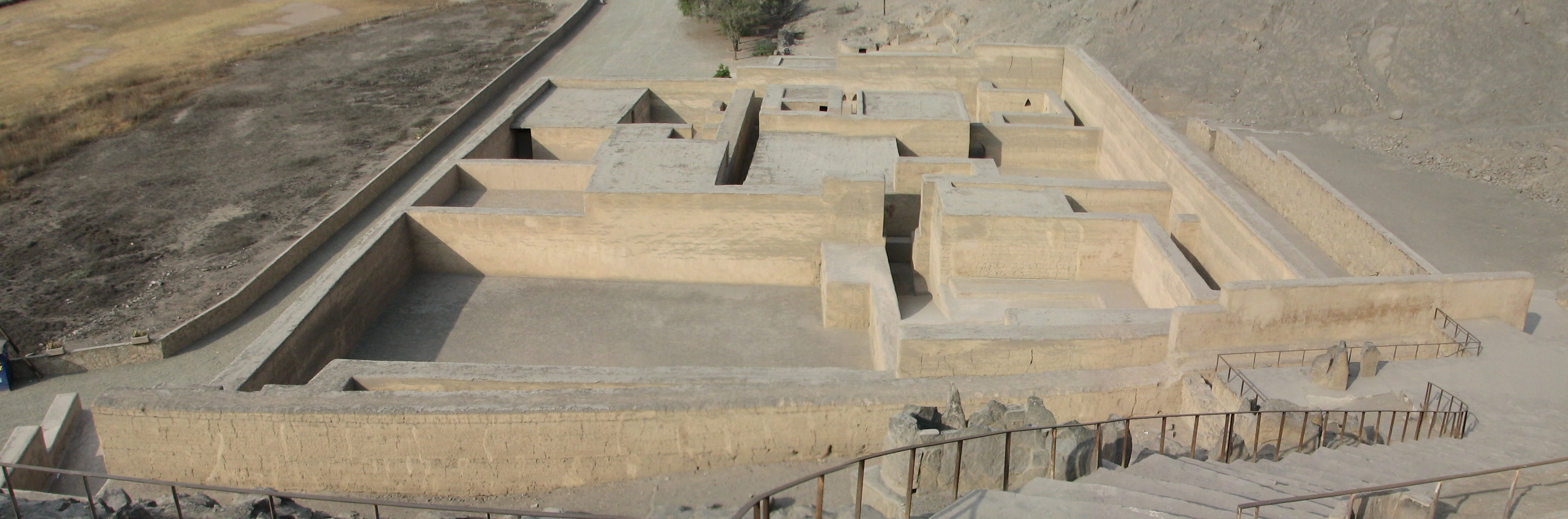
Image of Puruchuco archaeological site.

Puruchuco is an archaeological site in Peru that was an administrative center of the Inca period (1438–1533), located in the Ate District, in Lima.

== History ==
The construction of this architectural complex comes from the Inca culture. Puruchuco is located in the sector Huaquerones, a land of pyramids with ramps that contains one of the largest cemeteries in the Inca culture, have recently been studied by archeology. There are also complex areas as Puruchuca, San Juan de Pariachi and Huaycán. Of these Puruchuco is the smallest. Therefore, while this monument was the palace of a curaca (ruler) where he lived and managed, should be subject to other curacas with greater responsibility and power. The restoration of the palace and the protection of the archeological zone was initiated by Dr. Francisco Iriarte Brenner and continued by Dr. Arturo Jiménez Borja between 1953 and 1961. Today it has a site museum, which was the first tourist model of this type in South America. The site is located on the Central Highway "km 4.5" Ate District.

The various structures on and around Puruchuco have fallen into disrepair. Most of the locations have been severely vandalized. The sites near Monumental Stadium have been graffitied, while construction companies continue to destroy numerous other sites in Ate Vitarte and Túpac Amaru neighborhoods.
