= Lurín River =

River in Peru

Lurin River
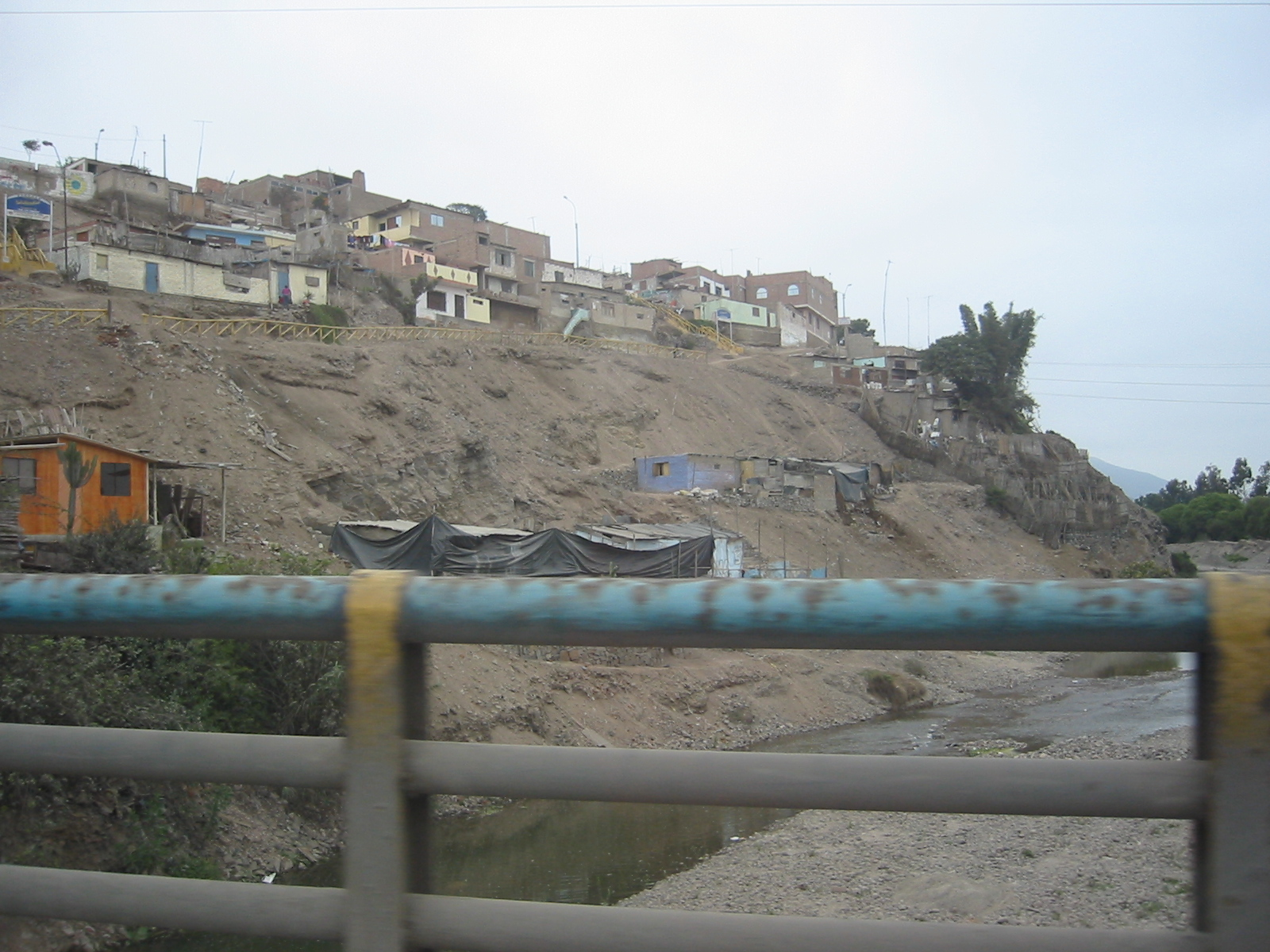
- Housing near the Lurin river

- Location of mouth
- Native name: Río Lurín (Spanish)

Location
- Country: Peru

Physical characteristics
- Mouth: Pacific Ocean
  - coordinates: 12°16′30″S 76°54′13″W
- Length: 108.57 km (67.46 mi)
- Basin size: 1,670 km^{2} (640 sq mi)

The Lurín River is a 108.57 km (67.46 mi) long watercourse located in the Lima Region of Peru. It originates in the glaciers and lagoons of the western Andes. It is known as the Chalilla River until joining the Taquía creek where it receives its common name. Its main tributaries are the Taquía, Llacomayqui, Tinajas, Numinkancha and Kanchawara on its left bank and the Chamacna on its right bank. It crosses the provinces Huarochirí and Lima in the Lima region before emptying into the Pacific Ocean. The drainage basin of the Lurín River covers an area of 1,670 km^{2} (640 sq mi).
