= Óscar R. Benavides Avenue =

Avenue in Lima, Peru

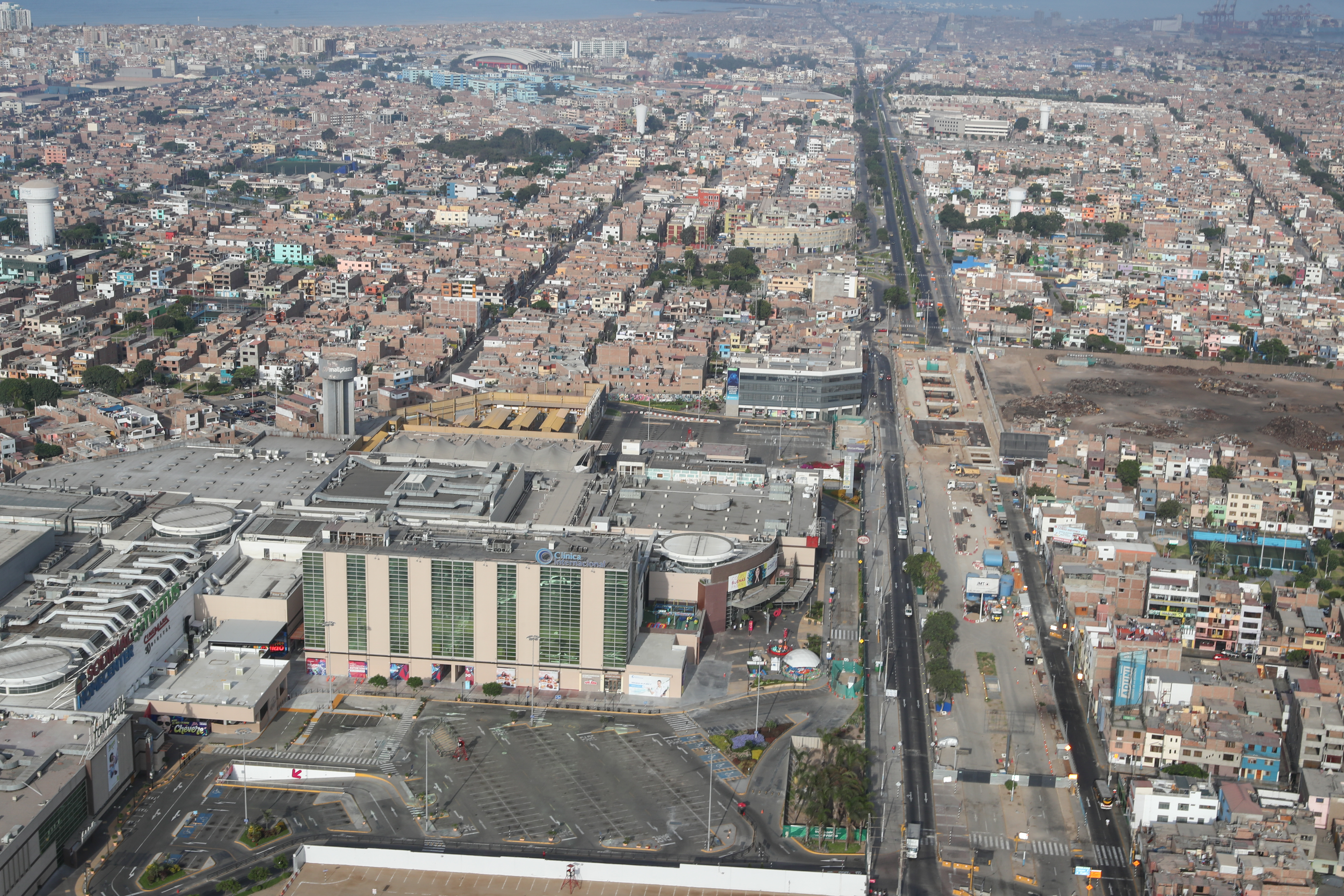
- Part of: Historic Centre of Lima
- Namesake: Óscar R. Benavides
- From: Plaza Dos de Mayo
- Major junctions: Tingo María, Universitaria, & Elmer Faucett avenues
- To: Avenida Guardia Chalaca

Construction
- Inauguration: 1799

Óscar R. Benavides Avenue (Spanish: Avenida Óscar R. Benavides), formerly known as Colonial Avenue (Spanish: Avenida Colonial), is a major avenue in Lima, Peru. It connects Lima District of the eponymous province with the districts of Bellavista and Callao of the neighbouring city, both within the Lima Metropolitan Area.

It starts at the Plaza Dos de Mayo, with its intersection forming part of the western limit of the historic centre of Lima, and continues westbound, joining the cities of Lima and Callao.

== Name ==
The avenue is named after Óscar R. Benavides, two-time president of Peru (1914–1915; 1933–1939). It is commonly known as Colonial Avenue (Spanish: Avenida Colonial), its former name.

== History ==
The road was inaugurated in 1799, under the government of Ambrosio O'Higgins, then Viceroy of Peru. It is one of the city's major avenues that follows the ancient Inca road system.

Since the 2010s, residential projects in the avenue have increased due to the expansion of the Lima Metro.

== See also ==
- Venezuela Avenue, also built to join both cities.
