= Uruguay Avenue =

Avenue in Lima, Peru

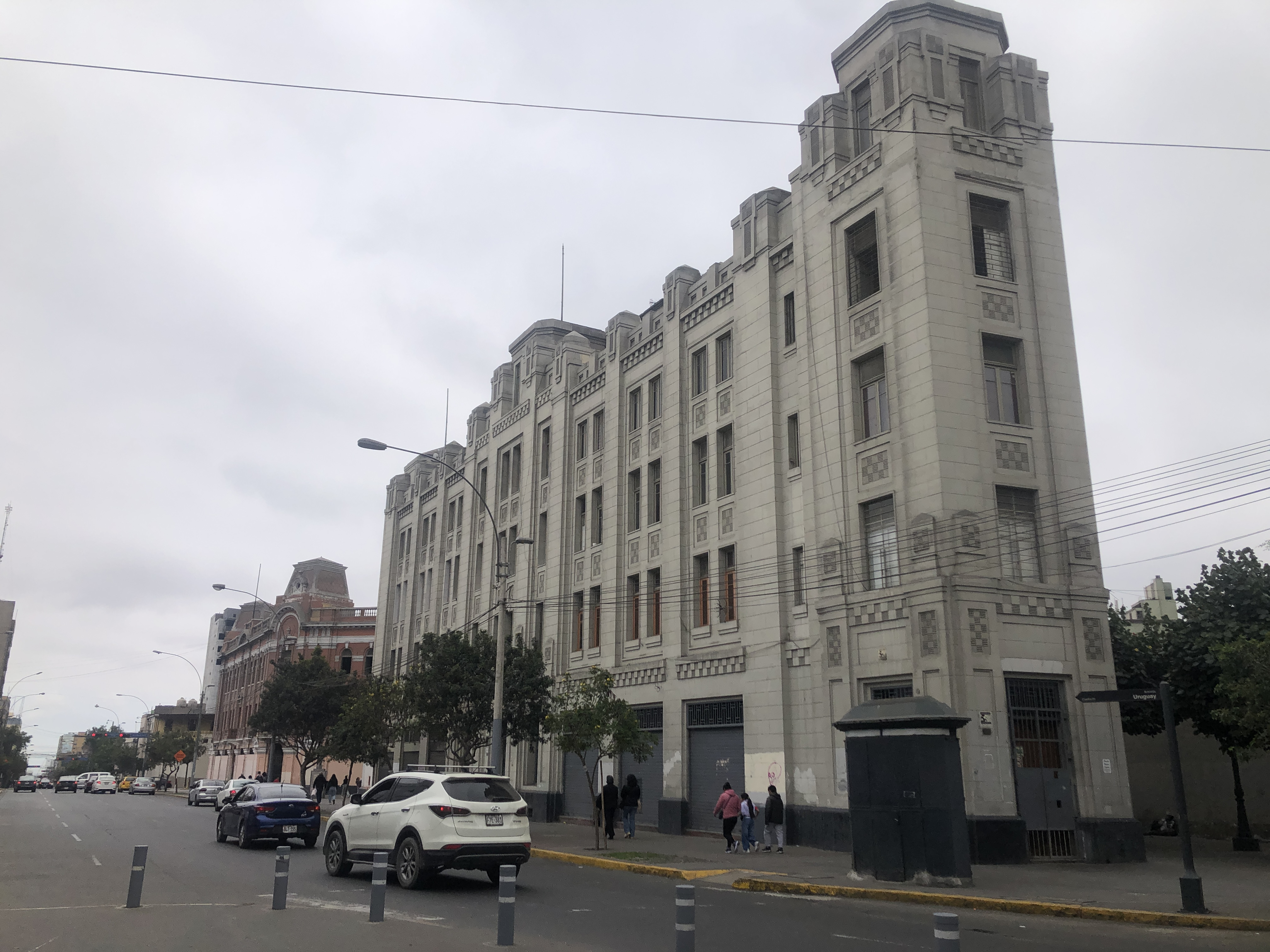
- View of the avenue's first block
- Part of: Historic Centre of Lima
- Namesake: Uruguay
- From: Jirón de la Unión
- Major junctions: Jirón Camaná, Jirón Washington, Wilson Avenue
- To: Alfonso Ugarte Avenue

Construction
- Inauguration: December 10, 1924 (Note: The avenue was first inaugurated in 1924 as part of the centennial of the Independence of Peru, but was only completed in 1926.)

Uruguay Avenue (Note: Also known as Republic of Uruguay Avenue) is an avenue of the historic centre of Lima, Peru. It begins at its intersection with the Jirón de la Unión and continues until it reaches Alfonso Ugarte Avenue, where its path is continued by Venezuela Avenue, which crosses the entirety of the city until it reaches Callao.

Both Uruguay and neighbouring Venezuela avenues were formerly a single avenue known as Progress Avenue (Spanish: Avenida del Progreso), and were inaugurated under the government of Augusto B. Leguía in 1924, the first of its kind in the country.

== History ==
The avenue was originally known as the "Progress Avenue," and was initially not separate from what would be later known as Venezuela Avenue, having been inaugurated under the second presidency of Augusto B. Leguía (1919–1930) in order to join the cities of Lima and Callao.

The roadworks started on January 15, 1924, and were carried out by the Foundation Company under engineer M. J. Spalding. The avenue was inaugurated by Leguía at the main square of Bellavista District on December 10, 1924, as part of the programme of the commemoration of the Battle of Ayacucho. The avenue's final section was inaugurated on February 21, 1926, located at La Punta District in Callao. Leguía again took part in the ceremony, accompanied by Mayors Luis T. Larco of Lima and Enrique de las Casas of Barranco, as well as Intendant of Callao, Eduardo Fry.

The largest section of the avenue was renamed after the Republic of Venezuela on February 2, 1943, and the section left of Alfonso Ugarte Avenue was instead renamed after Uruguay.

== Overview ==
The first block of Uruguay Avenue houses the former La Recoleta and Belén schools, both operated by the Congregation of the Sacred Hearts of Jesus and Mary and opened in the mid-19th century. Thanks to its protected status due to its administration by the French colony in the city, the Colegio Belén served as a refuge for Peruvians during the occupation of Lima, and later had singer-songwriter Chabuca Granda among its alumni. It was built over what was the Plazuela de Belén, named after the (also disappeared) church.

In 1930, the Tambo de Belén, one of the first buildings in the country, was built on the avenue. It was the home to figures such as Honorio Delgado. Near the building was the Edificio Ferrand, also by the same architect, which was where one of the first Ford del Perú S.A. stores in the country was opened, and also served as the residence of the German consul and delegation before relations were severed due to World War II. Therefore, it was the meeting place for people who supported Adolf Hitler and his system of government. Between both buildings is the first block of what would have been known as Paraguay Avenue (Spanish: Avenida Paraguay), whose path would've continued towards the Plaza Bolognesi, but was abandoned.

The avenue's third block houses the Colegio Lima San Carlos, the first to carry the coat of arms of Lima. It celebrated its 150th anniversary in 2022.

The avenue's intersection with Alfonso Ugarte avenue houses the College of Our Lady of Guadalupe since August 10, 1907.

== See also ==
- Venezuela Avenue
