= National University of Callao =

- Universidad Nacional del Callao
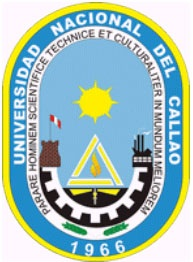
- Motto: Ciencia y Tecnología rumbo al tercer milenio
- Type: Public University
- Established: 1966
- Rector: Baldo Andrés Olivares Choque
- Location: Bellavista, Callao, Peru
- Campus: Urban
- Website: http://www.unac.edu.pe/

The National University of Callao is a post-secondary institution in the Bellavista District of the Constitutional Province of Callao in the country of Peru. It was established on 2 September 1966.

This scholarly institute retains its original technical character, unique to Peru. The University has maintained its technical character, and has grown to eleven departments, fifteen professional schools, and a postgraduate school.

== Departments ==
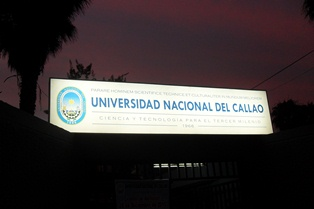
Universidad Nacional del Callao.

The university had in 1967 the following departments:

- Hydrobiological and fishing research
- Industrial chemistry
- Naval, industrial, mechanical, and electrical engineering
- Economic and administrative sciences.

Now, in 2023, the UNAC has 11 Faculties and 17 careers:

- Fishing & Food Engineering
- Mechanical Engineering (named "Faculty of Mechanical & Energy Engineering")
- Electrical and Electronic Engineering
- Industrial & Systems Engineering
- Chemistry Engineering
- Accountancy
- Economics
- Management
- Nursing
- Physical Education
- Faculty of Science (Mathematics & Physics)
- Environmental Engineering
