= Spadaro =

Spadaro is an Italian surname. This is an occupational surname for a professional soldier or, more specifically, a swordsman.

Notable people with the surname include:

- Antonio Spadaro (born 1966), Italian Jesuit priest
- Carlos Spadaro (1902–1985), Argentine football attacker
- Jack Spadaro (born 1948), American mining engineer
- Micco Spadaro, artistic name of Domenico Gargiulo (1609–1610 – ca. 1675), Italian painter of the Baroque period
- Odoardo Spadaro (1893–1965), Italian singer-songwriter and actor
- Pedro Spadaro (born 1977), Peruvian lawyer
- Peppino Spadaro (1898–1950), Italian actor; brother of Umberto Spadaro
- Umberto Spadaro (1904–1981), Italian film actor; brother of Peppino Spadaro

== Other ==
- Spadaro Airport, privately owned, public use airport in Suffolk County, New York, United States
