= San Lorenzo Megaport Project =

Coordinates: 12°03′38″S 77°14′23″W

The San Lorenzo Megaport Project is a proposed plan to build a huge air, naval, and terrestrial port on the island of San Lorenzo in Callao, Peru using land reclamation techniques. It plans to be the largest port and only megaport in Latin America. The island is strategically located on the middle west coast of South America where it has easy access to Asia, North America, and Oceania. It also has easy access to the Atlantic by a proposed railway to connect it to the Amazon River which is only 1,100 km (700 mi) away through Pucallpa. Its plan is to link the world to Latin America through Callao. It would be linked to the mainland by a proposed 4 km (2.5 mi) long underwater tunnel with access for subway, freight trains, and automobiles. A financial center would also be built on the island.

As of 2022 the project had been dropped by a transitional government, then a modified and expanded version, but without a port, was proposed by a company.

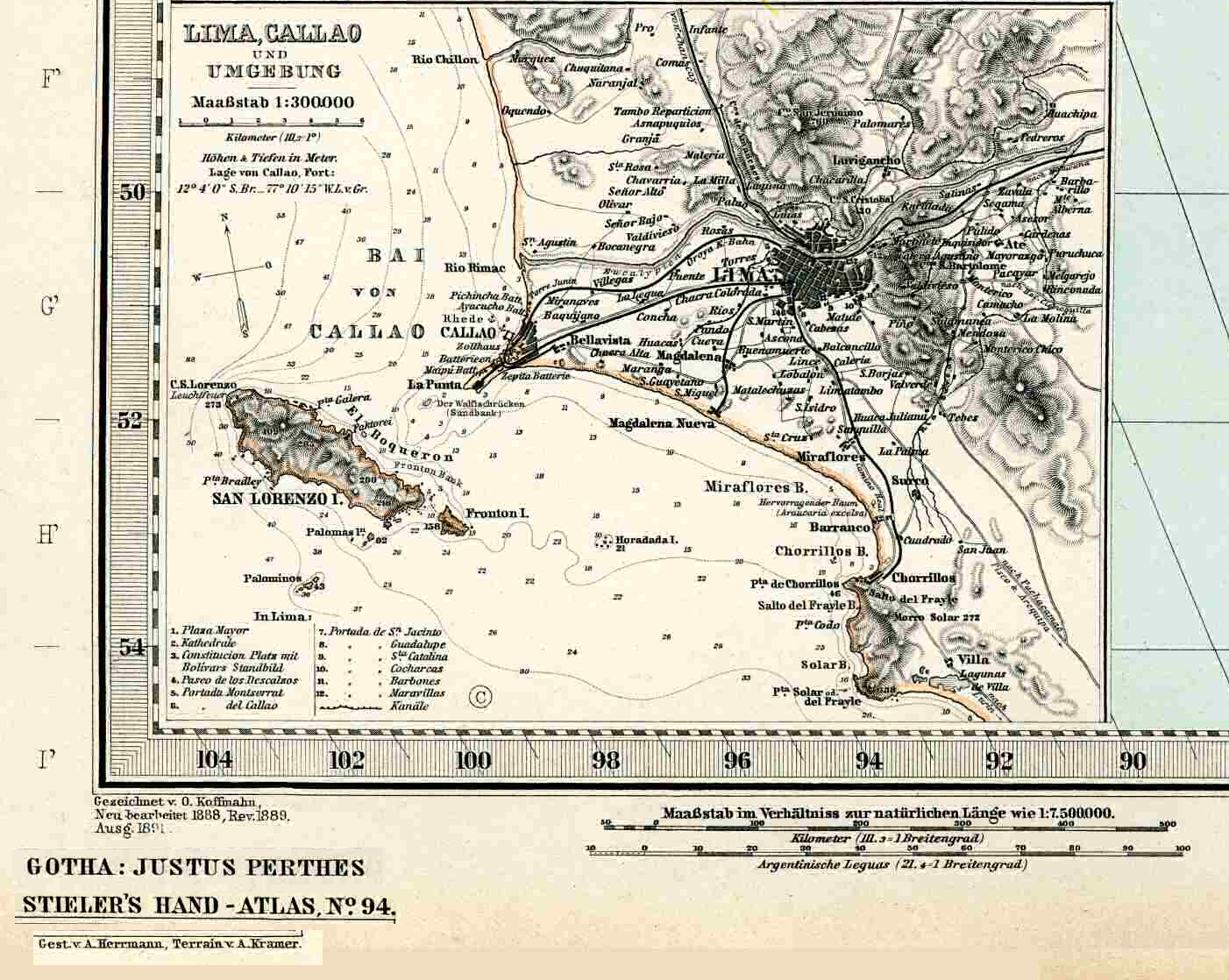

== Terrestrial operations/BiOceanic corridor ==
Located on the non-reclaimed part of the island will be the terrestrial port. It will be located near the airport. This is where all the parking, transit, buses, subways, micros will be located. Most importantly however, it will be the link between the Pacific and Atlantic oceans. From the terrestrial port hundreds of freight trains every day will originate to be transported cross-country to the city of Pucallpa where they will be shipped via the Amazon River to the Atlantic. From the port it will go through the tunnel under the ocean and keep going underground for 15 km (9.3 mi) until it leaves the Lima Metropolitan Area at around Lurigancho. From there it will cross the Andes then into the Amazon until it reaches Pucallpa in the Ucayali Region. From Pucallpa it will travel down the Ucayali River until it merges with the Amazon River and will pass by the city of Iquitos, the nation's fifth largest city. There it will pick up cargo and continue on the largest river in the world to the Atlantic Ocean.

== Mega Airport ==
The city of Lima is located in the middle of South America at a strategic location for connection to the rest of Latin America. It would be replacing the Jorge Chavez International Airport. The Peruvian aviation industry has been historically one of the strongest in Latin America but is currently in a large downwards movement. Investors predict this project would be enough to give a large enough boost to send it back into its former glory. There are currently non-stop flights from all the major cities in the Americas and from four European airlines. Many Asian airlines such as Japan Airlines, Singapore Airlines, and Air China have had interest in the past to flying to Lima as Peru is the only country in South America accessible non-stop from Asia. The airport would have 3-4 runways depending on how many airlines would be flying to the airport. Developers plan to make the airport building be in the shape of a Nazca figure.

== Mega Naval Port ==
As with the airport the location of the port is perfect as it is the middle of South America which is a perfect location to connect with the rest of Latin America. The water is over 50 m (160 ft) in depth. It can fit Post-Panamax ships. These ships can carry over 15,000 containers. The port is designed for trans-oceanic voyages. It is 7.4 km (4.6 mi) long. Under the airport would there be subterranean warehouses to store the cargo. When they are ready to be loaded onto the ships they would be elevated to the port and lighting would rely on fiber-optic technology.

== Financial/Hotel Center ==
The island would also have a financial center due to the large amount of commerce occurring on the island. Many of that area would also be airline offices. The area would also have, as with almost any other major airport of the world, many airport hotels in the area. It is safe to say that the financial center of the island will rival that of Downtown Callao

== The Tunnel ==
The tunnel will have three parts. One part would serve for inbound traffic. Another other part would serve outbound traffic. They will have sufficient lanes for the estimated traffic to be generated for the megalopolis-to-be. The third part of the tunnel will be the rail section. This part will be the most important part as it will be one of the most important keys in linking the Pacific and Atlantic corridor. The Lima Metro will also use the rail section when it expands to the airport. They would be lighted using fiber-optic technology. The tunnel will be built using special drilling machines which will probably be manufactured in Peru.

== Breakwaters ==
The island-port will not require many breakwaters. The strong southern currents would be blocked by a new breakwater located in the Chorrillos District.

== Land reclamation ==
The airport and naval port will be located on reclaimed land. The island itself is not completely flat so this is necessary. The port design requires it as well.

== Project cost ==
The total cost for the project is an estimated US$12 billion.

== Environmental costs ==
The island of San Lorenzo is home to thousands of sea birds, as well as a large breeding colony of sea lions. It stands in contrast to the sprawling polluted megalopolis of Lima and Callao. The island is a natural resource that could be exploited for tourism.

== Progress ==
Over several years nothing was done, and the project was essentially abandoned by a transition government, in favour of improving Callao Port with foreign investment. In 2022 the company Proinversión asked the architect of the megaport project to update and expand his project. A plan was proposed with five zones: an Urban Centre, a large Ecological Park, a zone for residences and other uses, and a Naval Base to replace the one already existing in the area. The new proposal did not include a port.

== See also ==
- Megaprojects
- Callao
- Jorge Chavez International Airport
- La Punta District
- Lima
- List of Pacific Ports
