= Venezuela Avenue =

Avenue in Lima, Peru

Republic of Venezuela Avenue
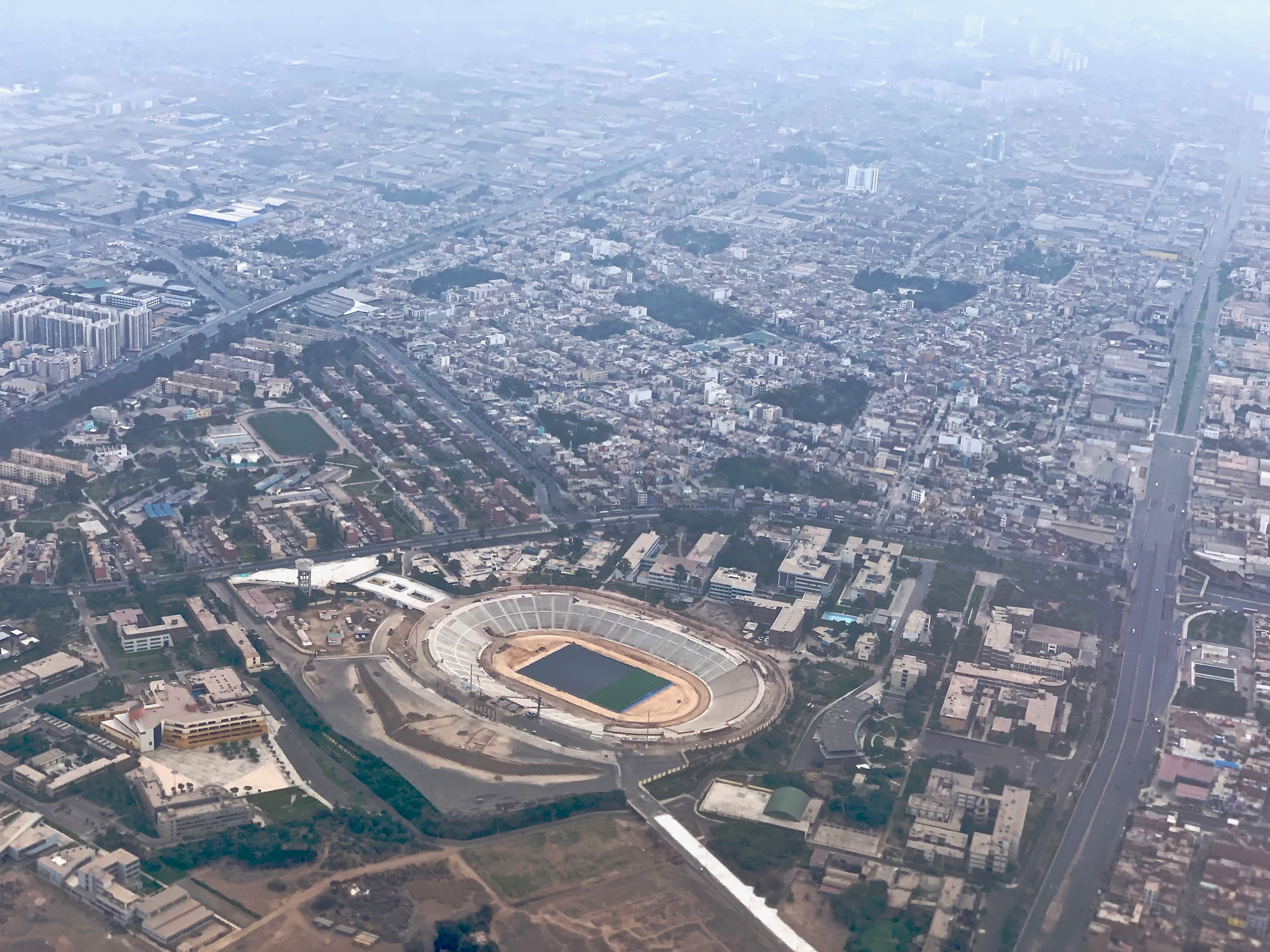
- Main campus of the University of San Marcos next to the avenue (right)
- Part of: Historic Centre (until 1943)
- Namesake: Republic of Venezuela
- From: Alfonso Ugarte Avenue
- Major junctions: Arica Avenue, Avenida Universitaria, Faucett Avenue
- To: Óvalo de La Perla

Construction
- Inauguration: December 10, 1924 (Note: The avenue was first inaugurated in 1924 as part of the centennial of the Independence of Peru, but was only completed in 1926.)

Venezuela Avenue (Note: Also known as Republic of Venezuela Avenue) is a major thoroughfare of the districts of Lima, Breña and San Miguel of Lima Province, and Bellavista and La Perla districts in Callao. It begins west of Alfonso Ugarte Avenue and continues through the entirety of the city until it reaches Callao.

Both Venezuela and neighbouring Uruguay avenues were formerly a single avenue known as Progress Avenue (Spanish: Avenida del Progreso), and were inaugurated under the government of Augusto B. Leguía in 1924, the first of its kind in the country.

== History ==
The second presidency of Augusto B. Leguía (1919–1930) was carried out under Leguía's so-called New Motherland policy, a so-called "re-birth" of the country. With a large number of foreign investments pouring into the country and the centennial of the Independence of Peru taking place in 1921, Leguía carried out a massive transformation programme of the city of Lima. Among these projects was a new road that would join the capital with neighbouring Callao, which would later be known as "Progress Avenue." It would replace Colonial Avenue, which was then in a poor state.

The roadworks started on January 15, 1924, and were carried out by the Foundation Company under engineer M. J. Spalding. The avenue was inaugurated by Leguía at the main square of Bellavista District on December 10, 1924, as part of the programme of the commemoration of the Battle of Ayacucho. The avenue's final section was inaugurated on February 21, 1926, located at La Punta District in Callao. Leguía again took part in the ceremony, accompanied by Mayors Luis T. Larco of Lima and Enrique de las Casas of Barranco, as well as Intendant of Callao, Eduardo Fry.

The avenue was renamed after the Republic of Venezuela on February 2, 1943, with unanimous approval in the Congress of Peru, who also approved that a plaque honouring Simón Bolívar be placed on its first block. The section to the right of Alfonso Ugarte Avenue was instead renamed after Uruguay.

== Overview ==
The avenue crosses westwards from Lima District towards Callao. The National University of San Marcos' main campus is located in the avenue.
