= Manuel Cipriano Dulanto =

Peruvian politician

Manuel Cipriano Dulanto (July 17, 1801 – March 17, 1867) was a Peruvian politician and military man.

He fought in several battles participating with Jose de San Martin and Simon Bolivar.

He was a colonel of the Army and also first Mayor, Governor and Senator of Callao.

His parents were José Dulanto y Bernardina Valenzuela.

He granted a ship to the Peruvian War Navy and equipped a battalion for the defense. He also built hospitals, hospices, schools, from his own assets. He was an illustrious Freemason. The Chamber of Installed Master Masons of Callao bears his name.
