= Mi Perú District =

District of Callao, Peru

Mi Perú
- District
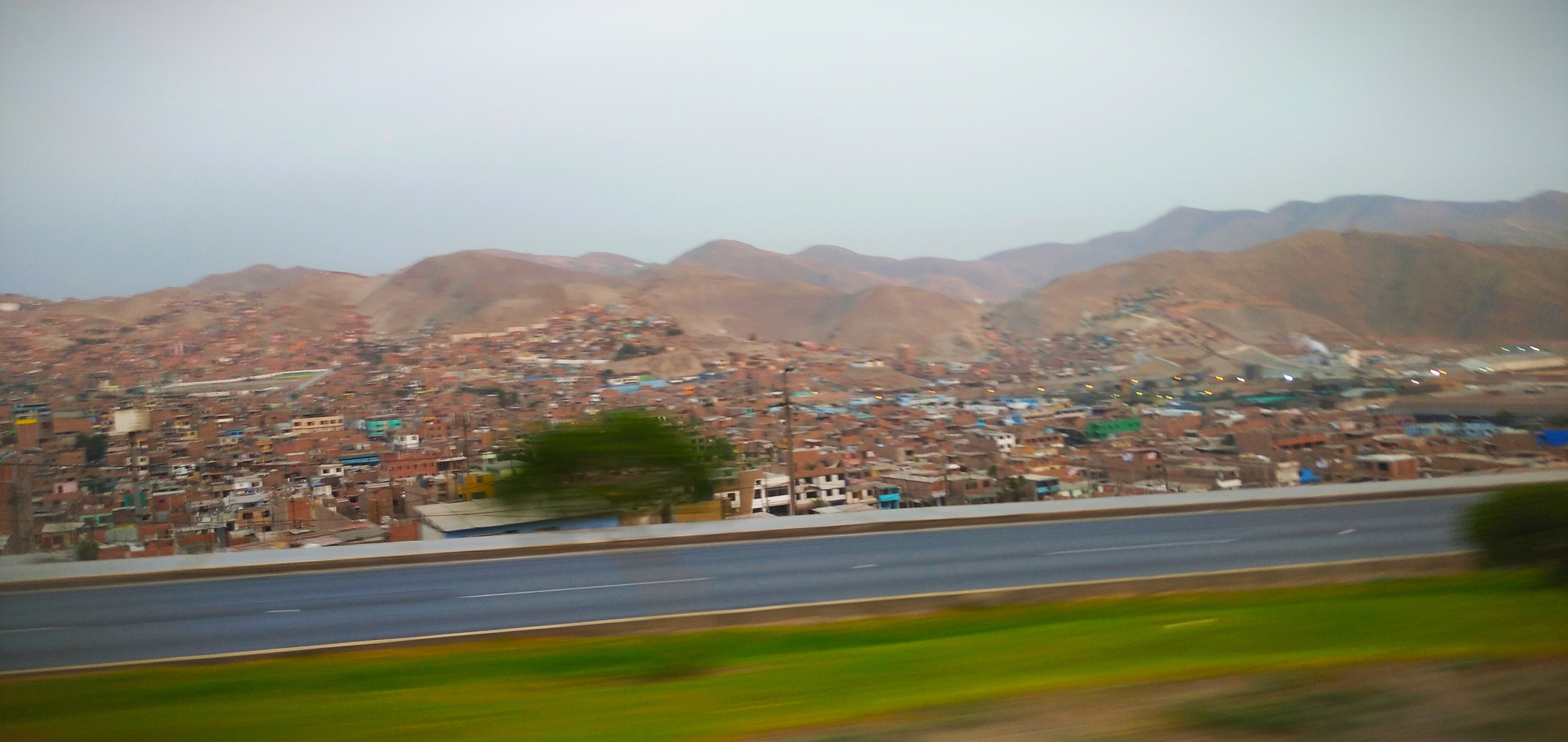
- View from Néstor Gambetta Avenue

- Flag Coat of arms

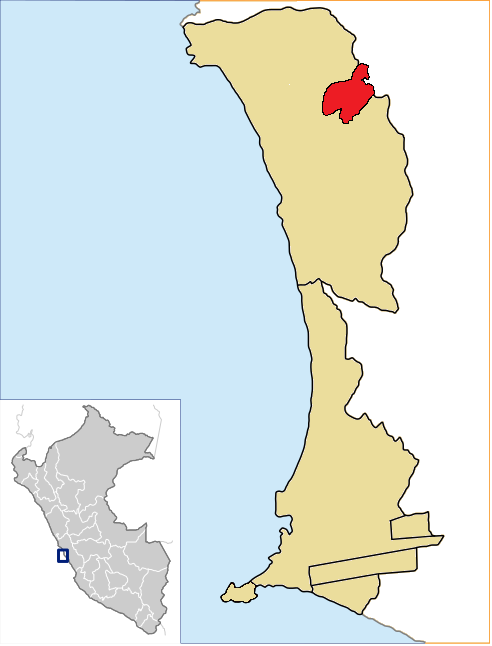
- Location in Callao
- Coordinates: 11°51′15″S 77°7′21″W
- Country: Peru
- Province: Callao
- Created: May 17, 2014
- Capital: Mi Perú
- Subdivisions: 1 populated center

Government
  - Mayor: Agustín Santamaría Valdera (2019-2022)

Area
  - Total: 2.47 km^{2} (0.95 sq mi)
- Elevation: 34 m (112 ft)

Population (2017)
  - Total: 45,297
  - Density: 18,300/km^{2} (47,500/sq mi)
- Time zone: UTC-5 (PET)
- UBIGEO: 070107
- Website: www.munimiperu.gob.pe

Mi Perú is a district of Callao, Peru. Initially a slum, it was elevated to a populated centre and was ultimately made a district in 2014.

== History ==
Mi Perú was part of Ventanilla District until May 17, 2014, when it was created as District by Law N° 30197.

== Geography ==
The district has a total land area of 2.47 km^{2}. Its administrative center is located 34 meters above sea level.

=== Boundaries ===
- East: Puente Piedra District
- North, west and south: Ventanilla District

== Authorities ==
As of 2015 the mayor of the district was Reynaldo Encalada Tovar. Irvin Chavez Leon was mayor in 2025, serving a term from 2023-2026.

== See also ==
- Administrative divisions of Peru
