= Avenida Alfonso Ugarte =

Avenue in Lima, Peru

Alfonso Ugarte Avenue
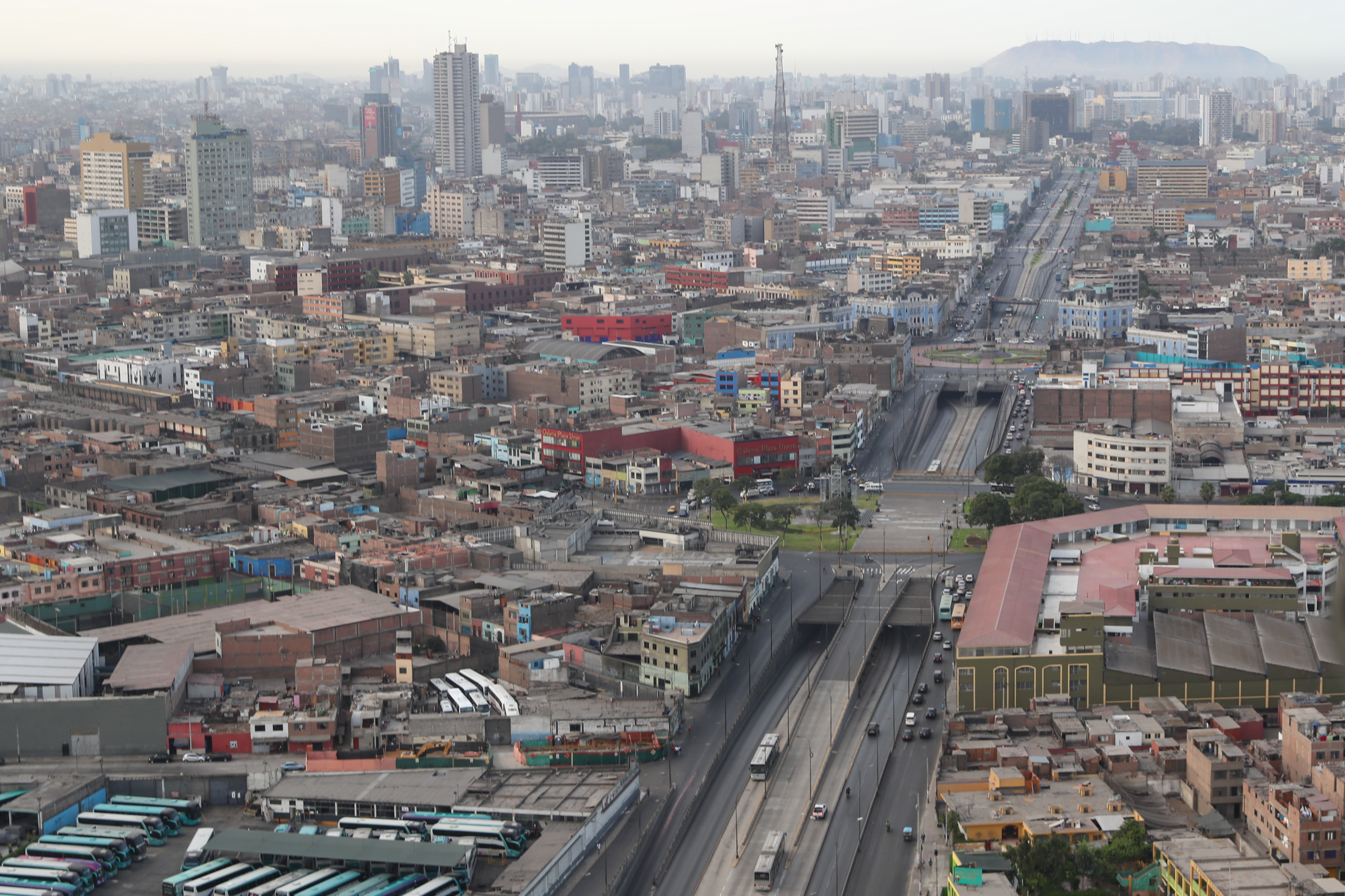
- Aerial view
- Interactive map of Alfonso Ugarte Avenue
- Part of: Historic Centre of Lima
- Namesake: Alfonso Ugarte
- From: Puente del Ejército
- Major junctions: Jirón Quilca, Venezuela Avenue, Uruguay Avenue, Bolivia Avenue, Spain Avenue
- To: Plaza Bolognesi

Construction
- Inauguration: February 18, 1928

Alfonso Ugarte Avenue (Spanish: Avenida Alfonso Ugarte) is a major avenue located in the historic Centre of Lima. It begins in the Puente del Ejército and crosses the Plaza Ramón Castilla and Plaza Dos de Mayo, continuing until it reaches the Plaza Bolognesi.

== Name ==
The avenue is named after Alfonso Ugarte, a Peruvian businessman turned colonel during the War of the Pacific. It was originally known as the Alameda de Circunvalación (or Avenida de Circunvalación) due to it bordering the city at the time of its construction, with its section north of Dos de Mayo Square formerly known as Bolognesi Avenue (Spanish: Avenida Bolognesi).

== History ==
The avenue is located in an area where the Walls of Lima once stood, originally known as the "Carretera del Gas" starting in the late 19th century after the gas factory that supplied fuel to the city, located on it. Under Augusto B. Leguía, it was re-inaugurated as the Alameda Circunvalación in 1928.

In 1965, the covered trench overpass that crosses Plaza Ramón Castilla was built. In the mid-1980s, a road corridor for public transportation similar to the one on Brasil Avenue was implemented, which is currently only preserved in the last block of the avenue. In 1994, the overpass built decades ago was extended to Jirón Quilca, crossing Plaza Dos de Mayo and Jirón Zepita. The road corridor was extended along the underground route and bus stops were implemented, which would later be dismantled to make way for the 2 de Mayo station.

In 2008, construction of the segregated corridor (COSAC I) and Metropolitano stations began, for which it was necessary to demolish almost the entire old public transportation road corridor and partially modify the structures of the existing overpasses. Since then, conventional transport routes circulate on the mixed road alongside private transport (which increased in 2014 after the implementation of the Blue Corridor), making the avenue one of the most congested in the city.

The historic neighbourhood of Monserrate is located next to the avenue.

== See also ==
- Historic Centre of Lima
