= Jhoao Ward =

Peruvian footballer (born 1989)

Personal information
- Full name: Jhoao Santiago Ward Gallegos
- Date of birth: May 4, 1989 (age 37)
- Place of birth: Callao, Peru
- Height: 1.82 m (6 ft 0 in)
- Position: Striker

Team information
- Current team: Sport Áncash
- Number: 11

Youth career
- Academia Cantolao
- Alianza Lima

Senior career*
Years	Team	Apps	(Gls)
2008	Alianza Lima	0	(0)
2009	→ José Galvez (loan)	20	(1)
2010	Atlético Minero	6	(1)
2011	Cienciano	1	(0)
2012	Universitario de Trujillo		
2013	Sport Áncash	4	(0)
2014	Juventud Indoamérica		
2015	Deportivo AMVA		
2016–	Unión Huaral		
- * Club domestic league appearances and goals as of June 16, 2013

Jhoao Santiago Ward Gallegos (born May 4, 1989 in Callao) is a Peruvian footballer who plays as a striker for Sport Áncash in the Peruvian Segunda Division.

== Club career ==
He developed as a youth player in the popular football academy Academia Deportiva Cantolao. He moved to Alianza Lima. He then played in their youth team and was the top goalscorer of the U-20 team of Alianza Lima. In 2008, he was promoted to the first team. He never made his official debut with Alianza. In 2009, he was loaned to José Gálvez FBC.

== See also ==
- Football in Peru
- List of football clubs in Peru
