= Palomino Islands (Peru) =

Group of small islands off the coast of Callao, Peru

Islas Palomino (Spanish)
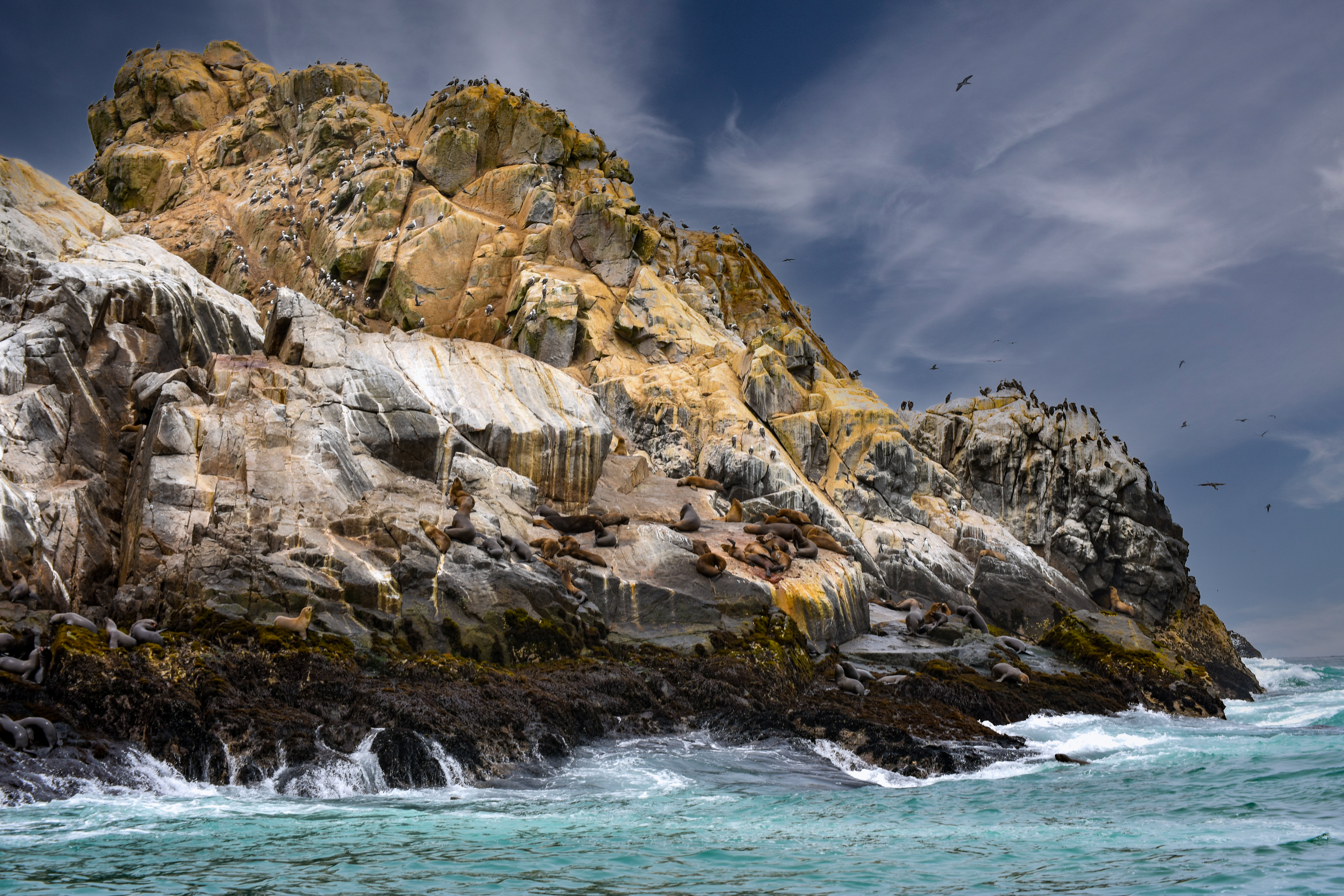
- Palomino Islands (Callao)

- Location within Peru

Geography
- Location: Pacific Ocean
- Coordinates: 12°07′45.8″S 77°13′59.9″W

Administration
- Peru
- Region: Callao

Additional information
- Time zone: PET (UTC-5)

The Palomino Islands (Spanish: Islas Palomino), also called Palominos Islets are a group of small islands off the coast of Callao, Peru. Home to a large population of sea lions and seabirds, it has become a popular tourist area.

== Location ==
The archipelago consists of four small islets located 6 miles west of the port city of Callao, at the western coast of San Lorenzo Island.

== Tourism ==
The islands make up a tourist area where it can see a significant amount of sea lions living in its natural habitat. A colony of over 8,000 thrives on the islands, and the lack of predators has allowed visitors to even swim among the sea lions.

The islands are home to large colonies of seabird. In its coasts can be found gulls, guanayes, zarcillos, boobies, Peruvian pelicans, patillos and red-legged cormorant.

In the highest part of the island is located an old lighthouse who served as guides of ships and steamers who frequented the port of Callao. On the island is also seen a water passage that is known as the Catedral de las Islas Palomino.

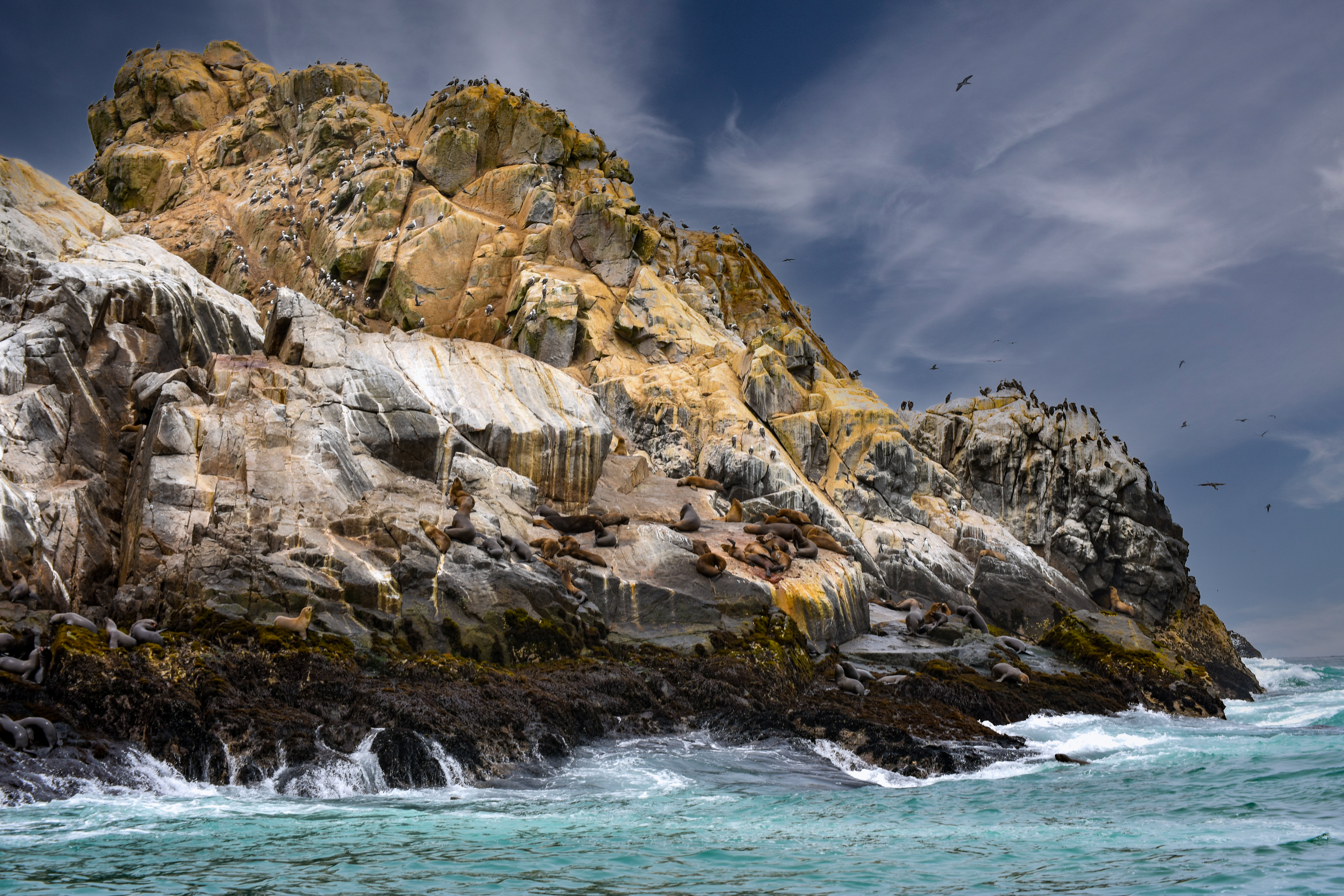
Palomino Islands in Lima, Peru

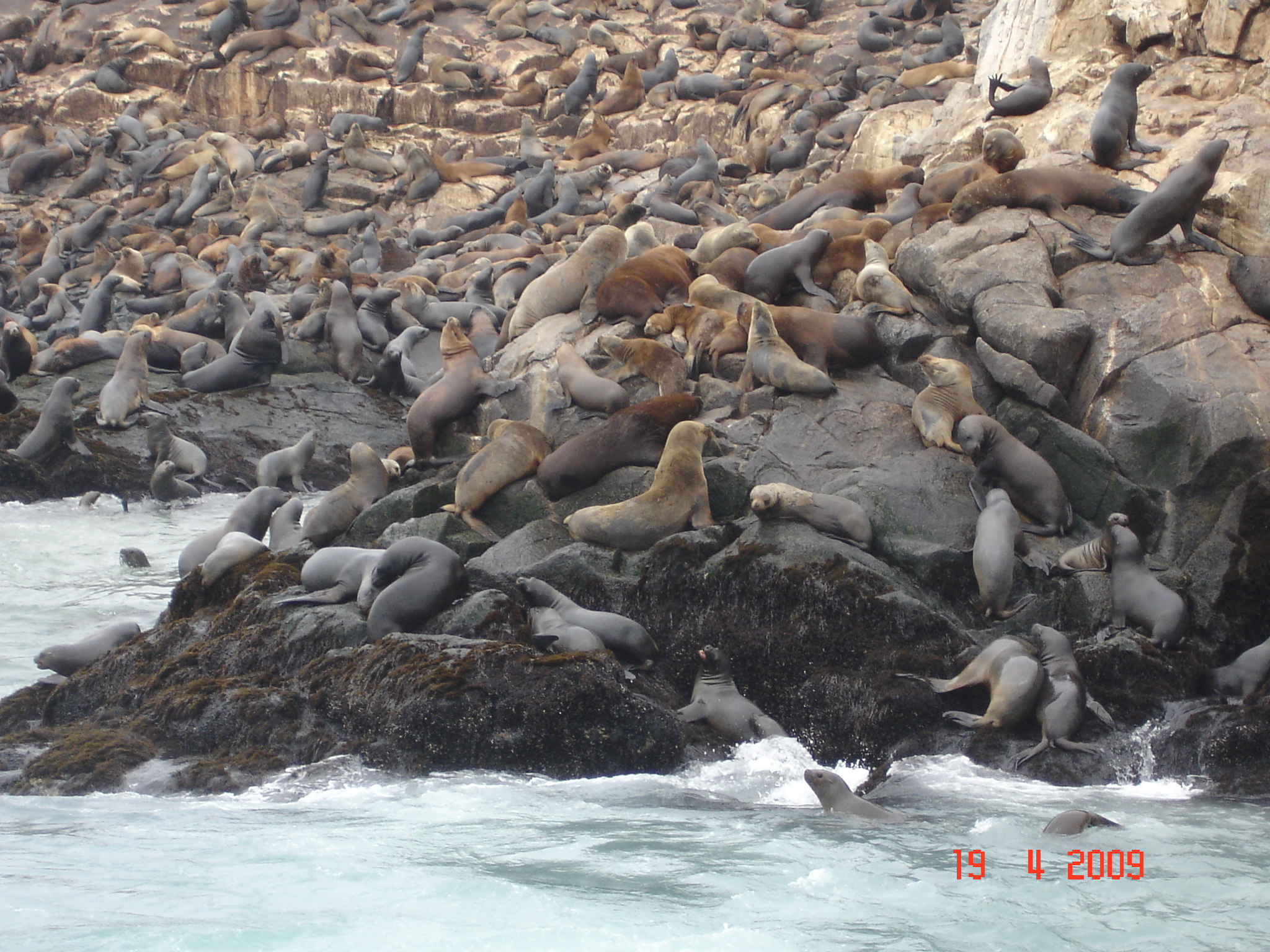
Sea lions in the Palomino Islands (Callao)

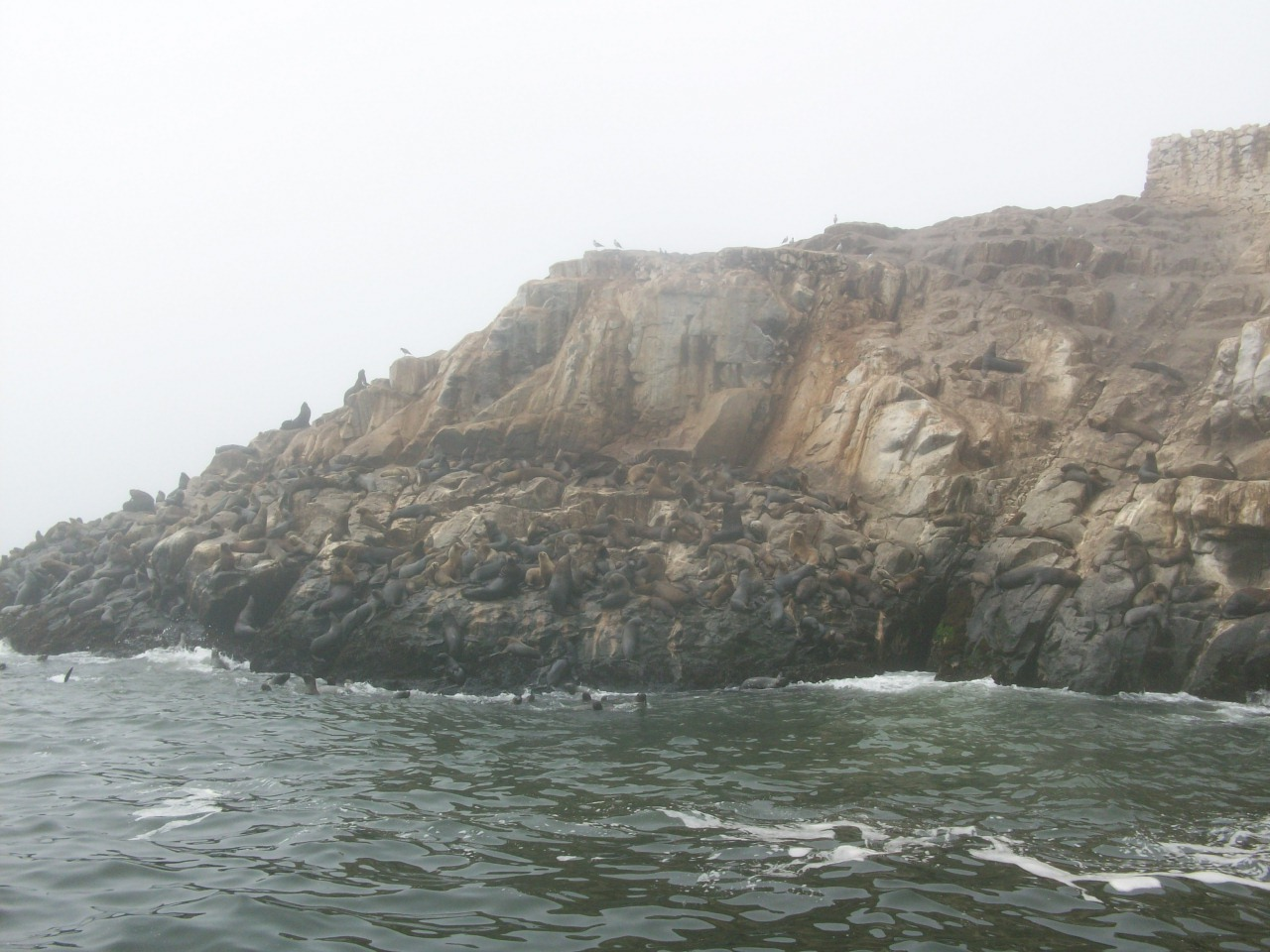
Sea lions at Palomino Islands

== See also ==
- List of islands of Peru
- Geography of Peru
- Guano Islands, Islets, and Capes National Reserve System
