= La Perla District =

District of Callao, Peru

Coordinates: 12.0660°S 77.1081°W

La Perla
- District
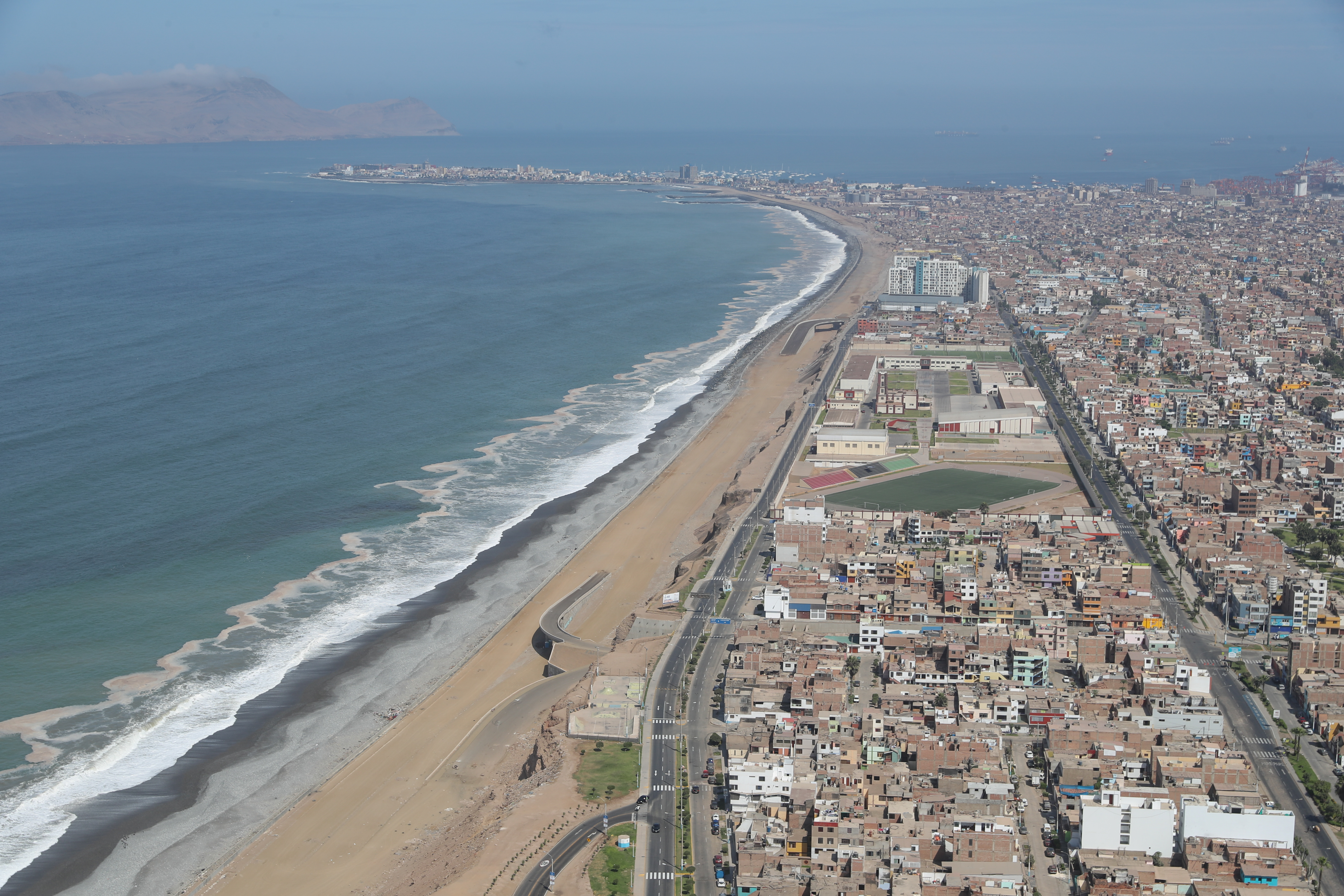
- Aerial view

- Coat of arms

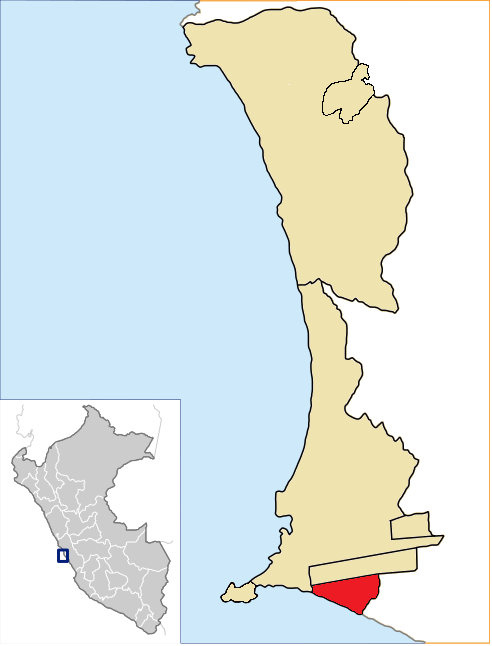
- Location in Callao
- Country: Peru
- Province: Callao
- Founded: October 22, 1964
- Capital: La Perla
- Subdivisions: 1 populated center

Government
  - Mayor: Rodolfo Mariano Adrianzén

Area
  - Total: 2.75 km^{2} (1.06 sq mi)
- Elevation: 18 m (59 ft)

Population (2017)
  - Total: 61,417
  - Density: 22,300/km^{2} (57,800/sq mi)
- Time zone: UTC-5 (PET)
- UBIGEO: 070104
- Website: www.munilaperla.gob.pe

La Perla is a district of Callao, Peru. Formerly an upper-class seaside resort that included the summer residence of the President of Peru during the early 20th century, it was officially established as a district on October 22, 1964.

The current mayor of La Perla is Rodolfo Mariano Adrianzen Castañeda.

== Geography ==
The district has a total land area of 2.75 km². Its administrative center is located 18 meters above sea level.

=== Boundaries ===
- South: Pacific Ocean
- East: San Miguel (in the Lima Province)
- North: Bellavista
- West: Downtown Callao

== Demographics ==
According to the 2005 census by the INEI, the district has 59,602 inhabitants, a population density of 21,673.5 persons/km² and 14,699 households in the district.
