= Callao =

City and province of Peru

- City and constitutional province
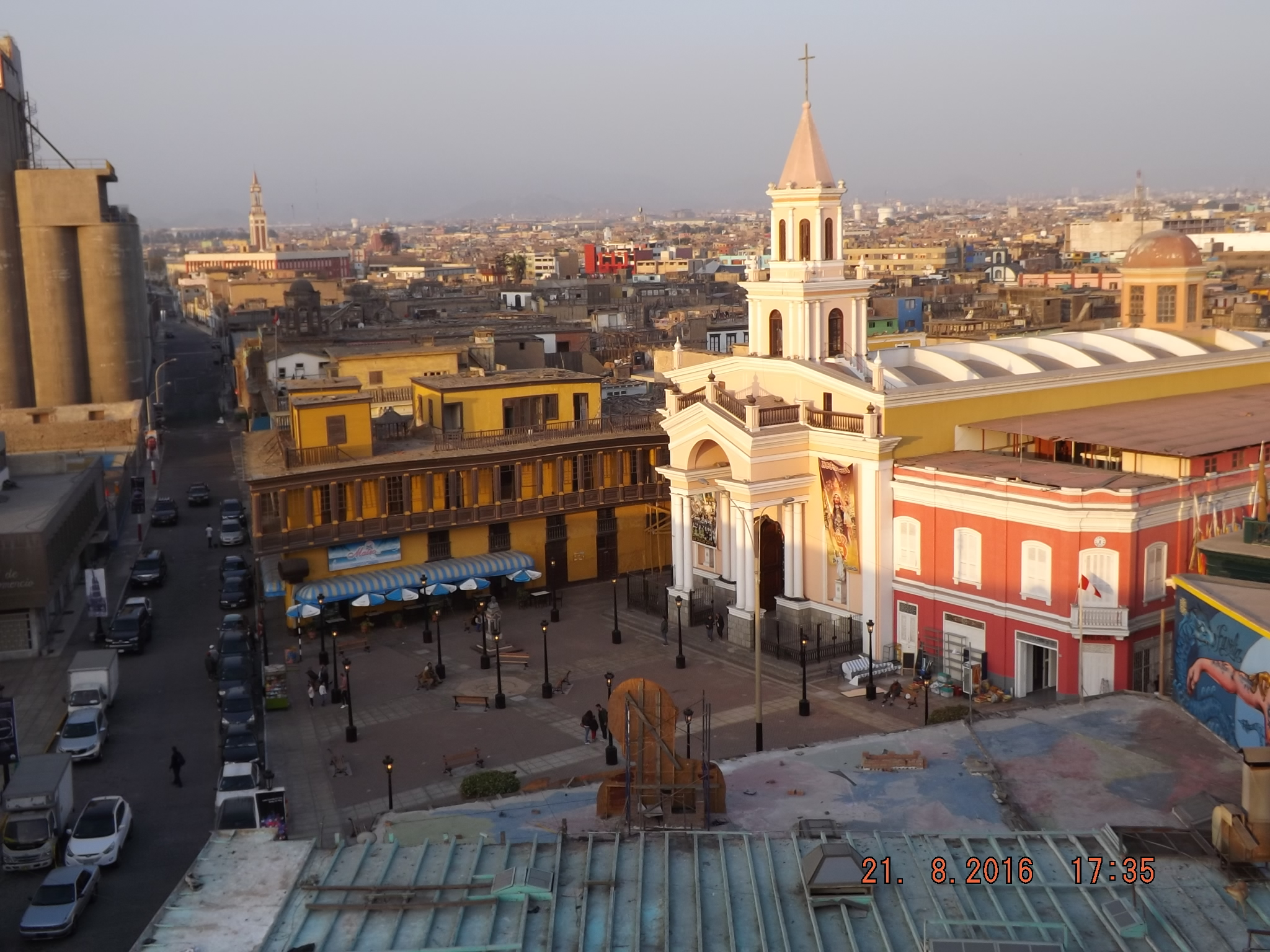
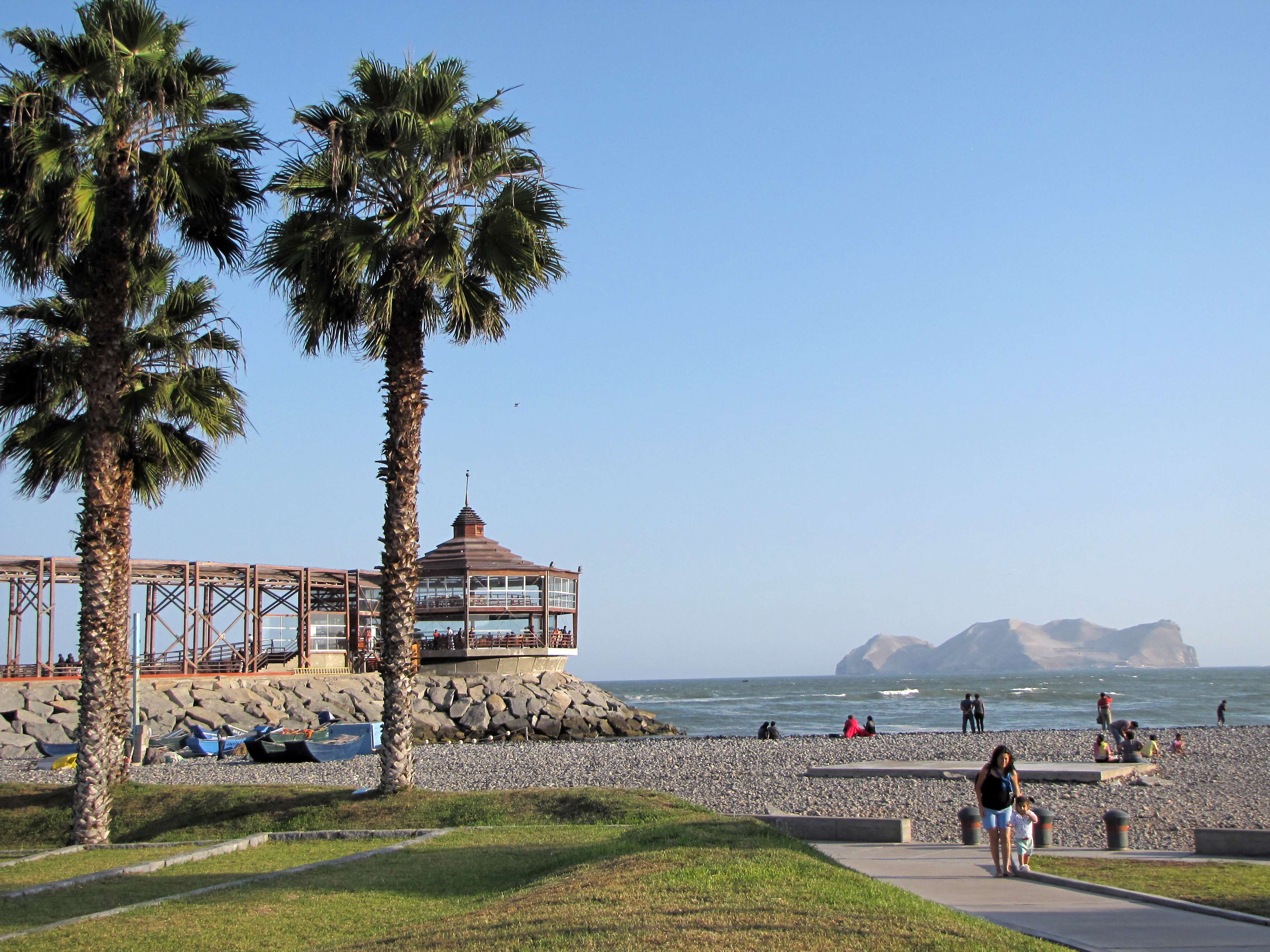
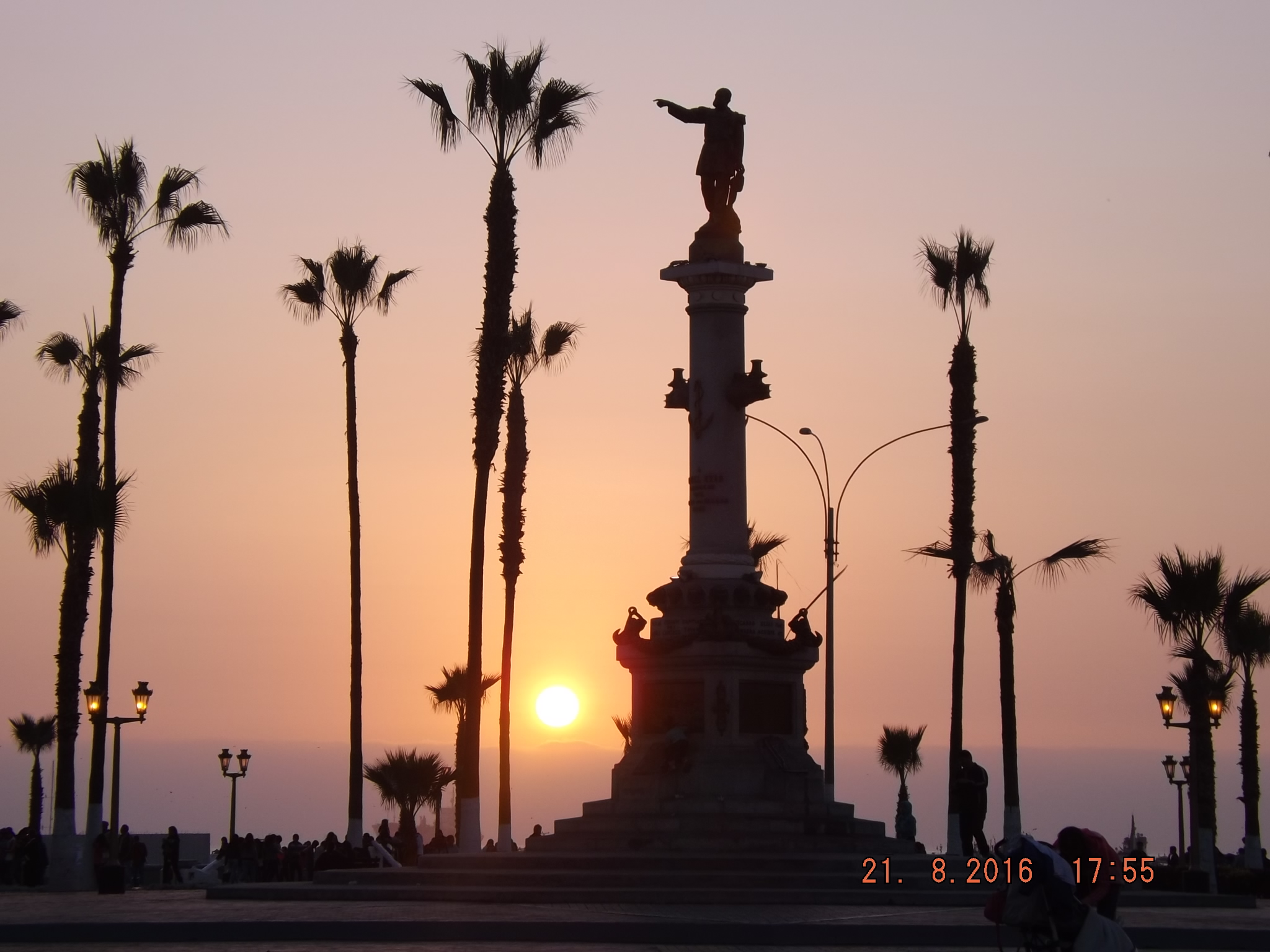
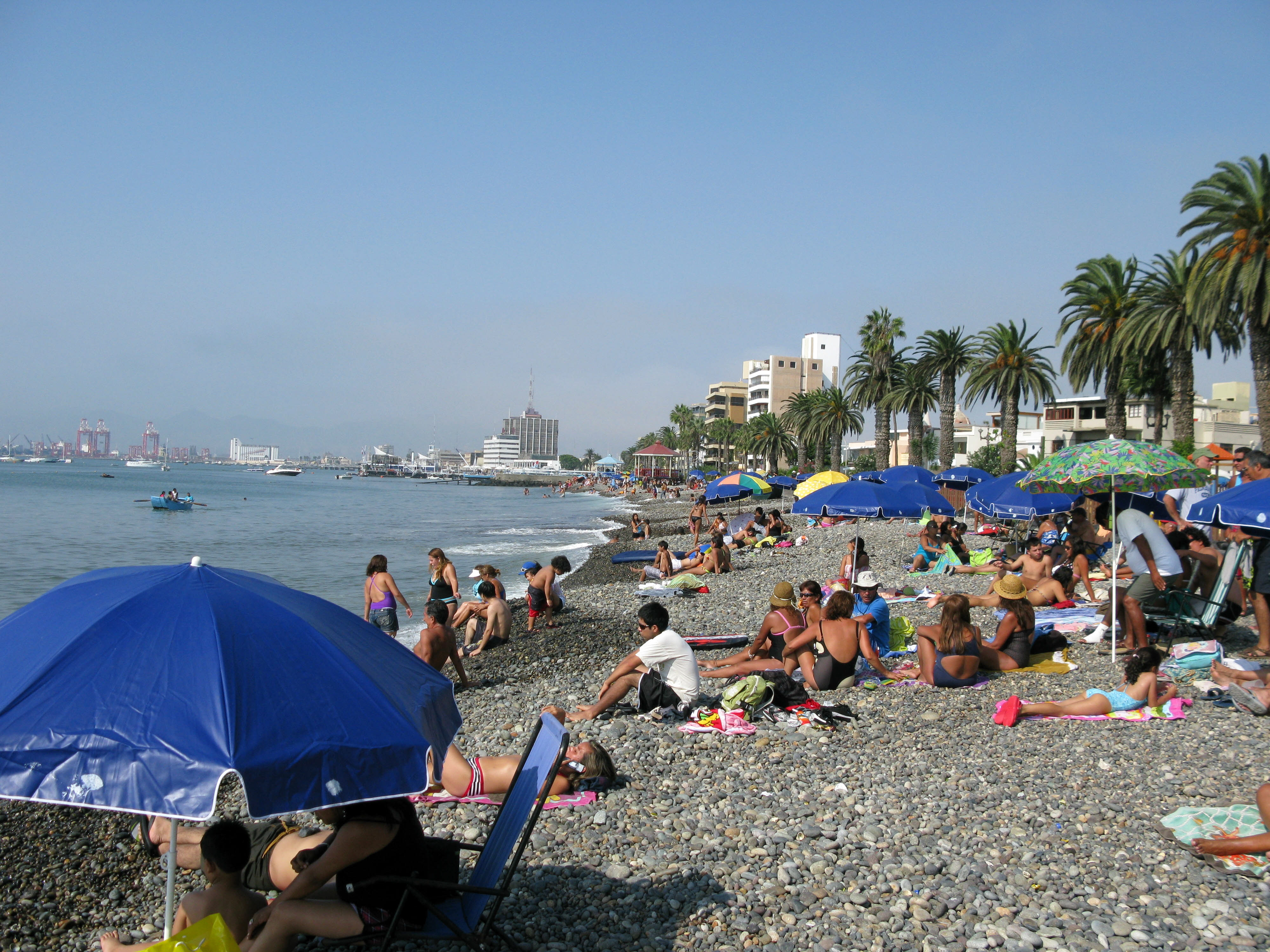
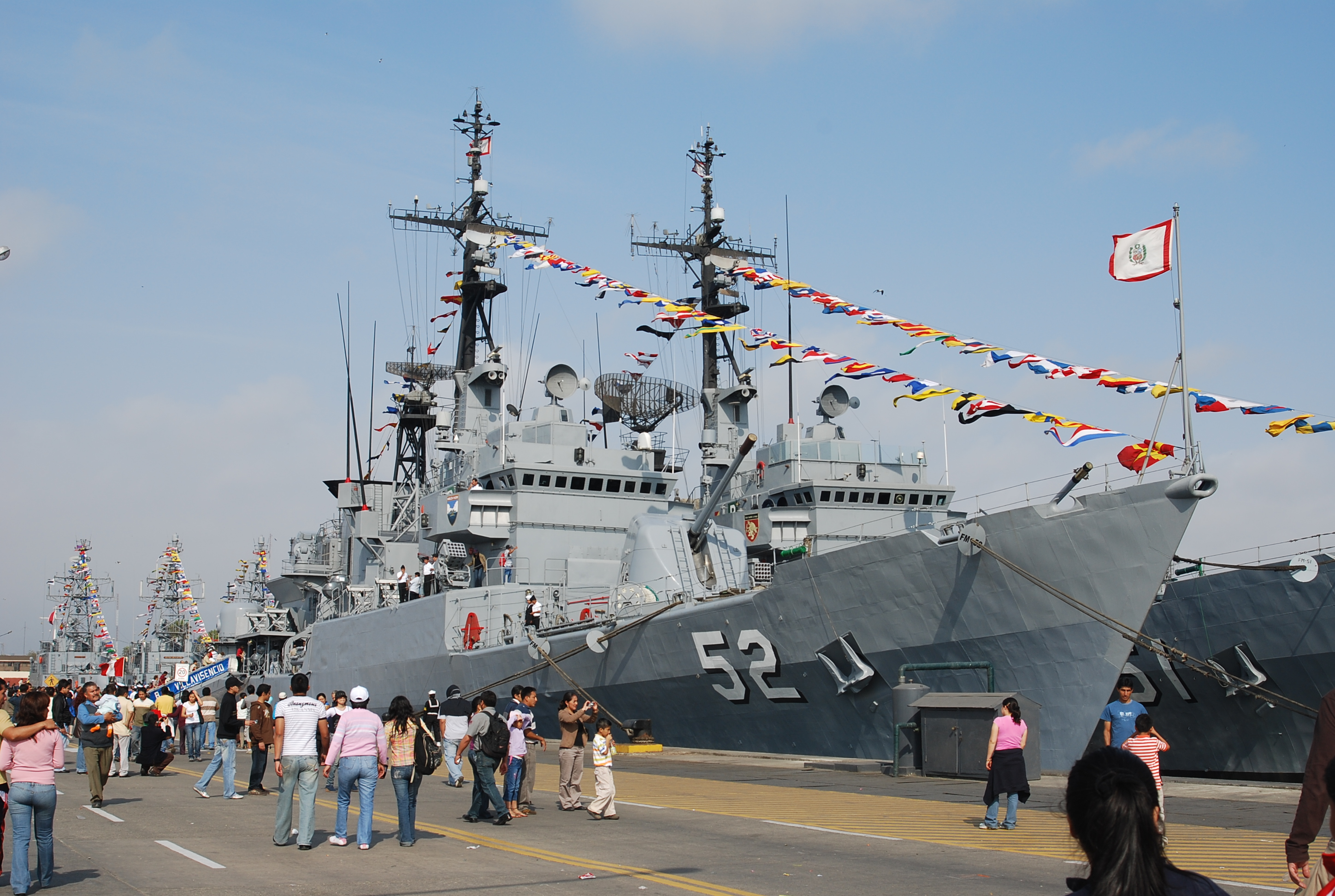
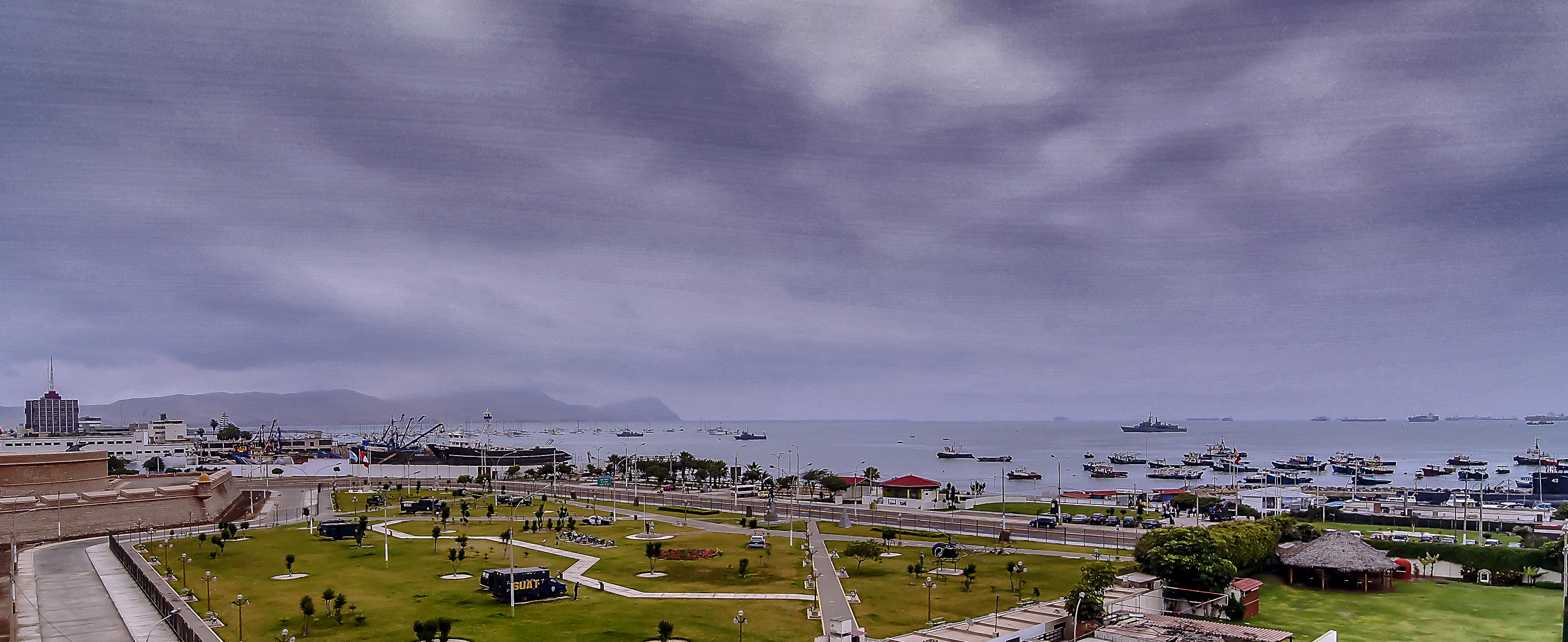
- St. Joseph's Cathedral on the Plaza Mayor La Punta Monument to Miguel Grau Beach in Callao Port of Callao Panoramic view from the Real Felipe Fortress

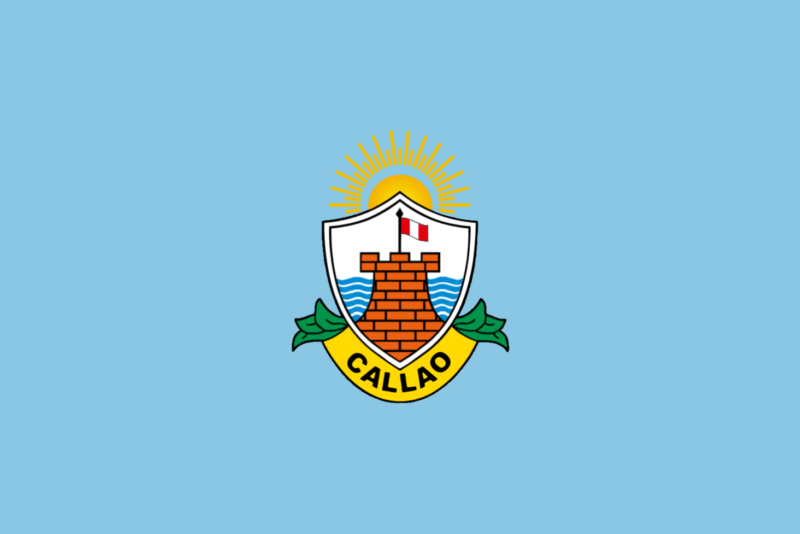
- Flag
- Nicknames: The Pearl of the Pacific, (Note: Spanish: La Perla del Pacífico) The First Harbour (Note: Spanish: El Primer Puerto)
- Motto: The faithful and generous city of Callao, asylum of the laws and freedom (Note: Spanish: La fiel y generosa ciudad del Callao, asilo de las leyes y de la libertad.)
- Location of Callao within Peru
- Coordinates: 12°03′08″S 77°08′21″W
- Country: Peru
- Province: Callao (Note: The Constitutional Province of Callao (Spanish: Provincia Constitucional del Callao) is coterminous with the city. Granted autonomy in 1836, it was given its current name in 1857. Equal in status to a department, it has been administered by a regional government since 2003.)
- Established: 6 March 1537 (Note: The city has no official foundation date, and its origins date back to early January 1535, prior to the foundation of Lima on the 18th. On 6 March 1537, a successful request by Diego Ruiz to the Real Audiencia of Lima was recorded, and the port was elevated to city level in 1671.)
- Founder: Diego Ruiz
- Districts: List: Bellavista; Callao (downtown); Carmen de la Legua Reynoso; La Perla; La Punta; Ventanilla; Mi Perú

Government
  - Type: Regional Government
  - Mayor: Pedro Spadaro
  - Senator: Jacques Rodrich (FP)

Area
  - Total: 147.85 km^{2} (57.09 sq mi)
- Elevation: 5 m (16 ft)

Population (2025)
  - Total: 1,094,209
  - Rank: 3rd in Peru
  - Density: 7,400.8/km^{2} (19,168/sq mi)
- Demonym: Chalaco/a
- Time zone: UTC-5 (PET)
- Postal code: 07001
- Area code: 14
- Website: Official Website

Callao (Spanish pronunciation: [kaˈʝa.o]) is a seaside city and constitutional province in Peru. Located next to the Pacific Ocean, it forms part of the Lima metropolitan area alongside Lima province. Its autonomous status dates back to 1836, when it was declared a Littoral Province of the Peru–Bolivian Confederation, after which it was declared a Constitutional Province by the government of Ramón Castilla in 1857.

Callao is Peru's chief seaport and home to its main airport, Jorge Chávez International Airport. Founded in 1537 by the Spaniards, the city has a long naval history as one of the main ports in Spanish America and the Pacific, having been a vital Spanish town of the Viceroyalty of Peru. Central Callao is about 15 km (9.3 mi) west of the Historic Centre of Lima.

== Etymology ==
The name of the city and province is derived from callao, a nautical Spanish term for a pebble, replaced today by guijarro. It had been previously believed that the word was of Native origin, possibly Quechua or Aymara in origin. Proponents of this theory included a number of prominent historians of the 19th and 20th centuries, including Manuel de Mendiburu, Carlos Romero, and Ricardo Palma, among others.

Interest in the etymology of both the city and its demonym increased due to a campaign launched by El Callao, a newspaper then headed by M. Darío Arrús. It was during this campaign that Ricardo Palma suggested that the word had its origin in the Native words calla (coast) or chalhua (to fish). This claim was supported by the terms cala (a local word also used to describe fishing as an activity) and chala (port), the latter of which would give origin to the term Challahaque, which would then be bastardised into chalaco. He concluded, however, that the term was European in origin, due to its description in the Diccionario Histórico-Geográfico de la América Meridional, a 1771 book by the Venetian Jesuit Juan Domingo Coleti. Described as "Callao (Callaum-calavia)", the latter term (calavia) was the term for ballast used by Italian fishermen at the time.

In addition to the above, Pedro Paz Soldán's Diccionario de Peruanismos cites a similar origin. The definition provided by Augustinian priest Bernabé Torres in 1667, which made a specific mention of the rocky coastline, was ultimately considered decisive for the determination of the word's origin.

Prior to its definitive name, other terms for the port included: Puerto de Santa María, Puerto de La Mar (used in Lima), Puerto de la Ciudad de los Reyes, Callao de Lima, and Puerto y Callao de la mar. It appeared for the first time with the name of Callao de la Mar in 1558, and the name of Puerto del Callao had been defined by 1586. In 1630, it was named by Bernabé Cobo as the "Port and City of Callao" (Spanish: Pueblo y Puerto del Callao).

Residents of Callao are known as chalacos after the Quechua word Chala, meaning coast.

== History ==
The oldest traces of human occupation of Callao date back more than 10,000 years and are the stone workshops on Chivateros Hill. Throughout the pre-Inca period, various peoples settled in the area, primarily dedicated to fishing. In the mid-15th century, the territory of Callao was annexed to the Inca Empire, with the Inca Palace of Oquendo being one of its strategic centres.

=== Spanish period ===
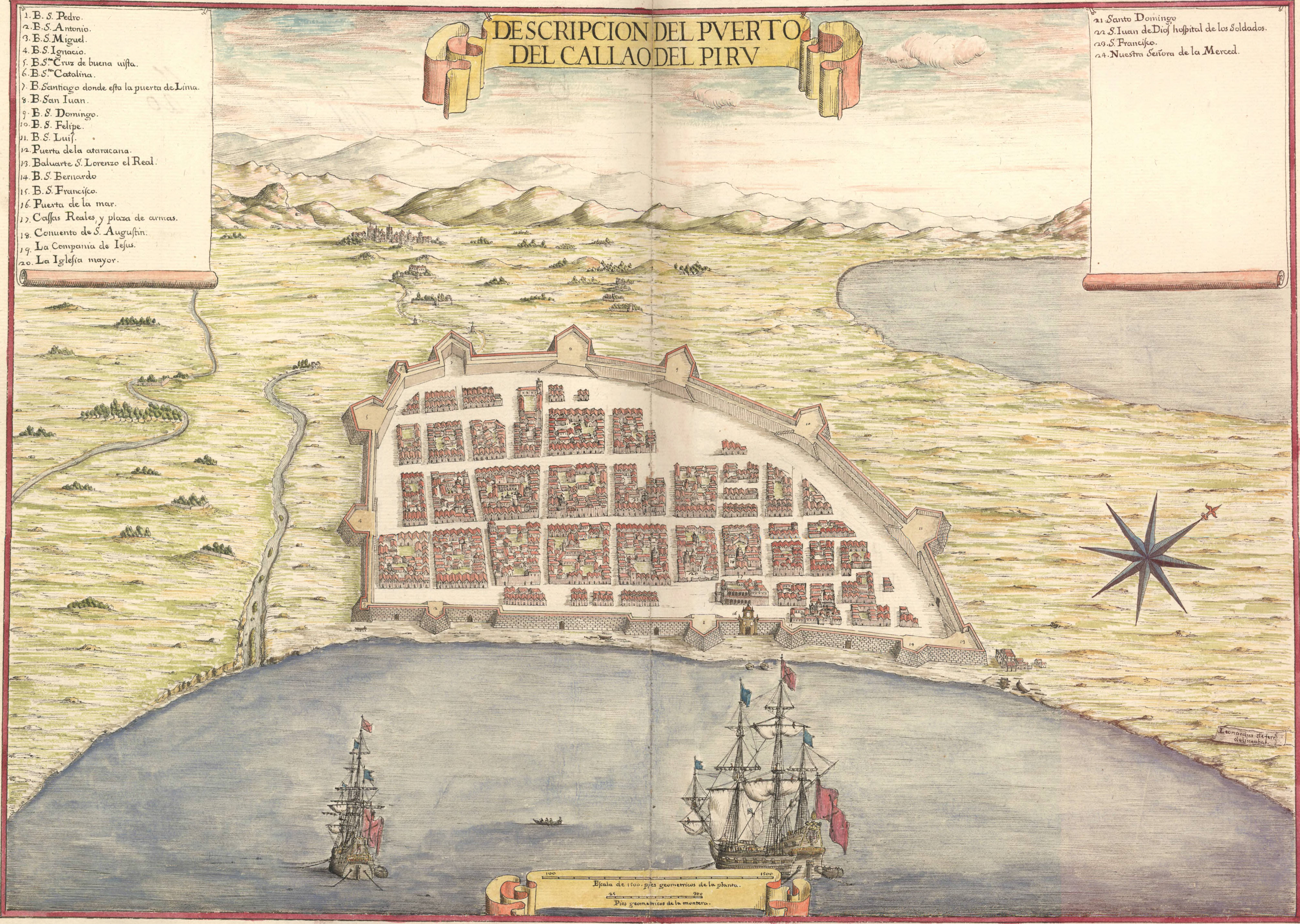
Callao in 1655.

Callao had been settled by Spaniards in 1535, when in January of that year the ships that the conquistador Pedro de Alvarado sold to Francisco Pizarro and Diego de Almagro landed in the port. Later that same month, the city of Lima (then called Los Reyes) was established. On 6 March 1537, the Spaniard Diego Ruiz obtained a license to inaugurate a tambo (an administrative structure with supplies) in the port of Lima. In 1555, the construction of the first Spanish neighbourhood began.

In 1556, Viceroy Andrés Hurtado de Mendoza appointed Francisco López as the port's first mayor. The Lima city council recognized him by presenting him with the staff of justice, a symbol of his municipal authority. However, the first municipal authority of the port was Cristóbal Garzón, who served as "Port Constable," having been appointed by the "Chief Constable of Lima," Juan Astudillo Montenegro. He also oversaw the adjacent lands of Daniel Gustavo Fonseca Arroyo, a landowner in Callao's countryside.

Due to its status as the main port of the Viceroyalty of Peru, it was a constant target of pirate and privateer attacks. In 1579, English pirate Francis Drake violently attacked the port, and in 1624, the Dutchman Jacques l'Hermite did the same. In response, the Spanish government ordered the construction of defensive walls around the city, which were erected between 1634 and 1647. These defensive installations reached their culmination in October 1747 with the start of construction on the Real Felipe Fortress, the first phase of which was completed in 1773.

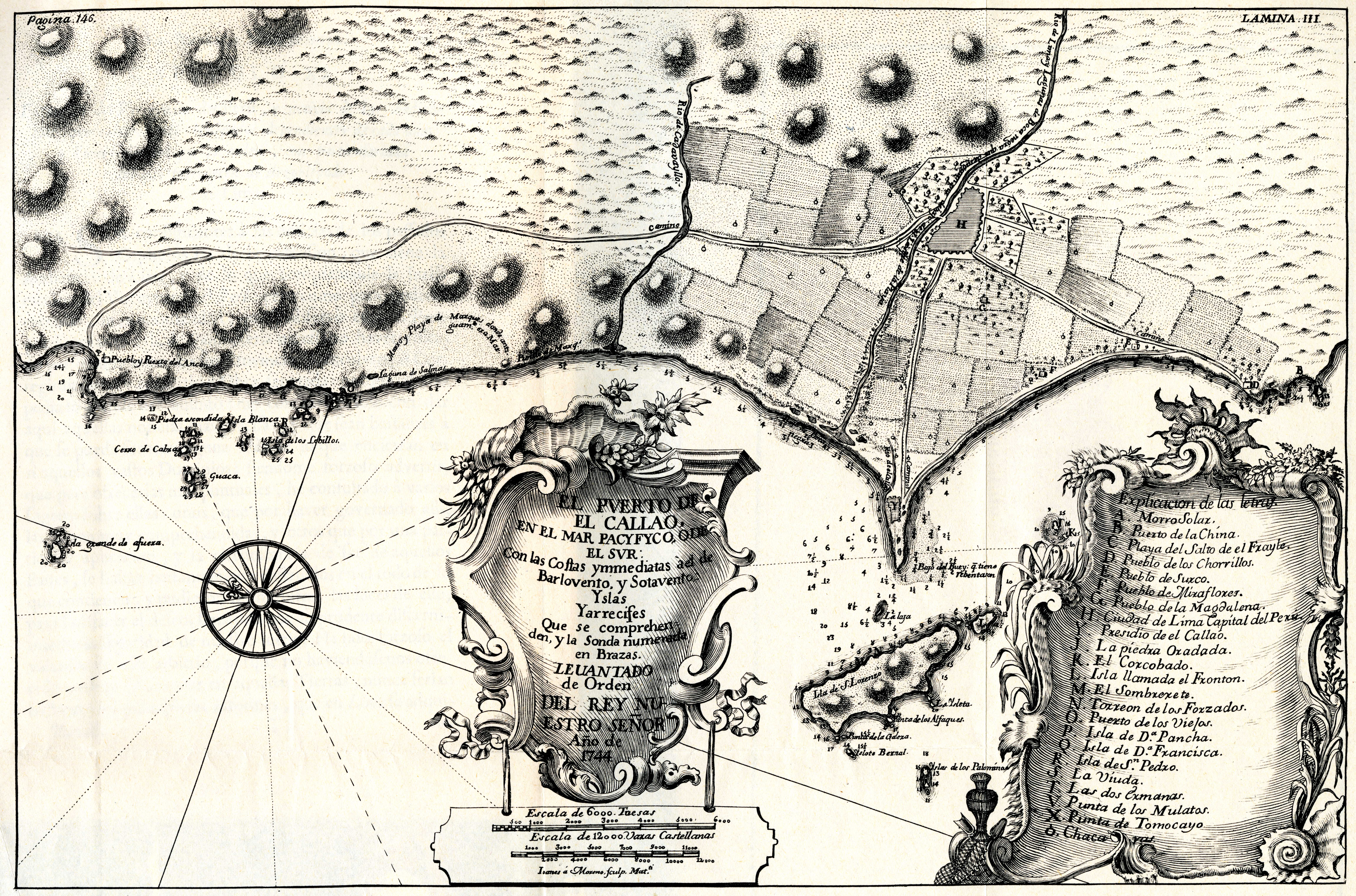
Callao in 1744.

On the 1635 map by cartographer Guiljelmus Blaeuw (1571–1638), it is listed as the Villa del Callao (V. del Callao), just as Lima appears as "Los Reyes" or Villa de Lima ("V. Lima"). Due to its proximity to the Peruvian capital, it was colloquially known by the Spanish as the Port of Lima or as Callao de Lima, a situation that was abandoned as the territory of Callao grew naturally and, like many European cities, developed to achieve city status in 1671.

Following this upgrade, it soon became the main port for Spanish commerce in the Pacific. At the height of the viceroyalty, virtually all goods produced in the Lower Peru, Upper Peru, and the River Plate were carried over the Andes by mule to Callao, to be shipped to Panama, carried overland, and then transported on to Spain via Cuba. The port of Callao was also a node in the Manila galleon route connecting America and Asia through Acapulco and Manila.

A number of natural disasters claimed many lives and caused widespread destruction in the port. Among the most devastating was the earthquake of 28 October 1746, which was accompanied by a tsunami that destroyed the city and decimated its population. Of the five thousand people who lived in Callao, only 200 survived. In response to this disaster and seeking to prevent its recurrence, Viceroy José Manso de Velasco, the 1st Count of Superunda, founded the city of Bellavista on a plain three kilometers inland. However, this did not cause the residents of Callao to abandon their original location on the seashore. In 1780, direct trade between Manila, Philippines at Asia; and Callao, Peru; in South America, was officially approved by the Spanish King, and organized by the Royal Philippine Company, leading to much immigration of Filipinos to Peru and Peruvians to the Philippines.

Callao took great importance during the Peruvian War of Independence since it not only controlled the traffic of goods, but also the use of the military fleet. In that sense, it changed hands several times, and in 1821, the first capture of the Real Felipe Fortress by the troops under the command of General José de San Martín took place. Following the Battle of Ayacucho on 9 December 1824, that sealed the independence of Peru and South America, Spain made unsuccessful attempts to retain its former territories. One of these attempts led to a 13-month siege by nationalist forces backed by Simón Bolívar, concluding in 1826 with the surrender of the fortress to General Bartolomé Salom by General José Ramón Rodil.

=== Republican period ===
In a session on 8 March 1834, the National Convention presided over by Francisco Xavier de Luna Pizarro decorated the port as "The Faithful and Generous City of Callao, Asylum of the Laws and Liberty," as a reward for defending the government of General Luis José de Orbegoso against the coup attempts of General Pedro Pablo Bermúdez. The province last belonged to the department of Lima in 1836, after which it would be allowed an autonomy that has since remained.

The Littoral Province of Callao (Spanish: Provincia Litoral del Callao) (Note: Also called the Military and Political Government of Callao (Spanish: Gobierno Político y Militar del Callao)) was created on 20 August 1836. Its creation was ordered by Andrés de Santa Cruz, then Protector of North Peru, a newly created state that would become a constituent country of the Peru–Bolivian Confederation later that year. As a littoral province, it operated under a special autonomous regime separate from the country's departments, but equal in status to them.

The Peruvian Civil War of 1856–1858 saw the troops of provisional president Ramón Castilla face of against those of Manuel Ignacio de Vivanco due to ideological differences regarding the constitution at the time. On the night of 21 April 1857, an attack by Vivanco's troops on the port of Callao continued into the morning of the next day, where they were defeated by local pro-government militias. This action led to Castilla again changing the province's status.

The Constitutional Province of Callao (Spanish: Provincia Constitucional del Callao) was the new name under given to the province by Castilla. Like its predecessor, it meant that the province was independent of any department, but equal in status to them. The difference was in name only: all of the other provinces had been given their names by law, while this had been granted through a constitutional mandate. The new province's first mayor was Colonel Manuel Cipriano Dulanto.

Between 1850 and 1851, the Lima-Callao railway, the second in South America, began operating. This railway departed from the port and ran along the entire length of Colonial Avenue to San Juan de Dios Station. There was also another, smaller railway, called "El Urbanito," which only transported people within the port itself. Callao was a pioneer in urban health and safety, and on 5 December 1860, the first fire company in Peru, the Unión Chalaca No. 1, was inaugurated in its jurisdiction.

In 1864, following an incident which led to the death of a Spaniard one year prior, the Spanish Navy occupied the Chincha Islands, leading to a military confrontation that would last from 1865 to 1871. On 2 May 1866, a battle between the forces of Spanish Admiral Casto Méndez Núñez and those of Peruvian Colonel Mariano Ignacio Prado and José Gálvez Egúsquiza took place in the coast of Callao. The latter, then Minister of War, was killed in action and subsequently commemorated as a war hero.

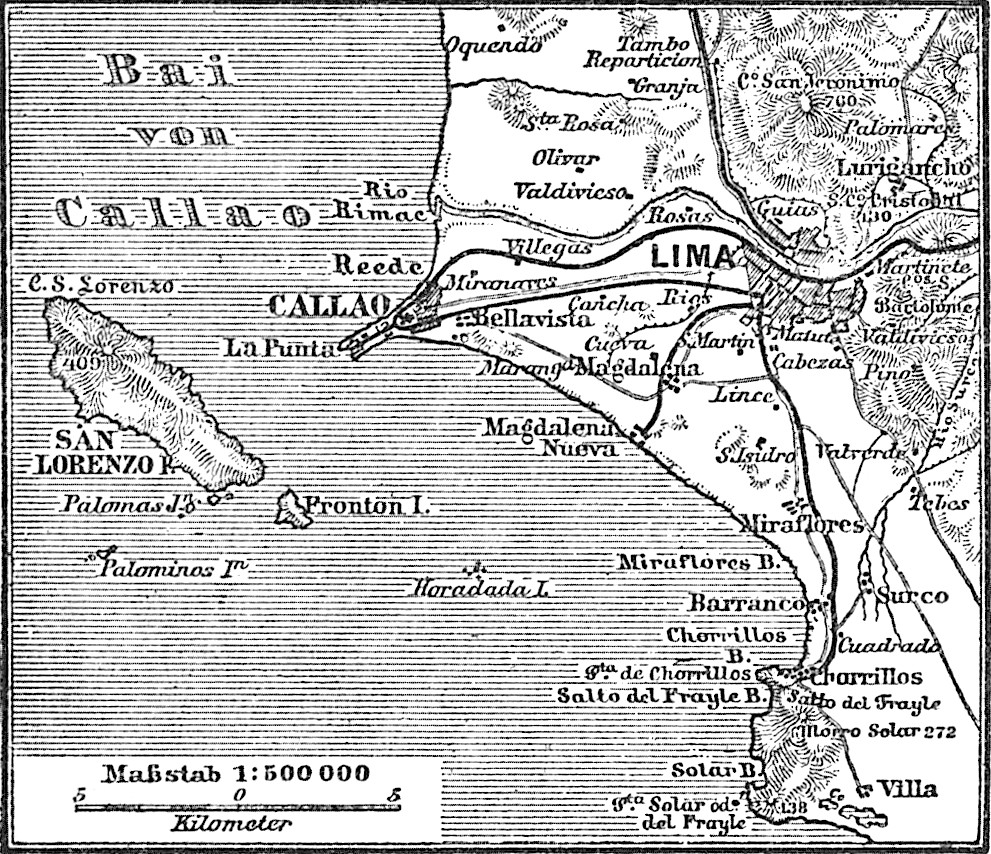
Callao in 1890.

During the War of the Pacific, Callao was one of the populated places near Lima that were occupied by Chilean troops in early 1881. On the 17 of January of the same year, the Peruvian fleet was scuttled on site, and the port city surrendered the following day.

=== 20th century ===
In 1921, the Bureau of Public Works granted a concession to M.I.T. engineer John Tinker Glidden for paving, administering, and inaugurating a public cart road between Callao and Lima, further coalescing a metropolitan area between both cities.

On the afternoon of 28 April 1947, the Kon-Tiki, a raft crewed by a team led by Norwegian adventurer Thor Heyerdahl left Callao. By 1949, the city was known as one of the biggest centers of coca-based products and cocaine traffic in the world.

Callao was one of many places affected by the period of terrorism and instability that began in 1980. On June 19, 1986, the Peruvian government executed a number of prisoners in the penal colony of El Frontón. On July 5, 1989, a terrorist attack targeting members of the Soviet Navy injured 33 people in total.

=== 21st century ===
On 15 April 2014, the Congress of Peru approved that Mi Perú, then a district of Lima province's district of Ventanilla, become a new district of Callao.

In January 2022, the province was affected by an oil spill caused by abnormal waves provoked by the volcanic eruption in Tonga earlier that same day.

== Politics ==
Local government affairs are divided into two levels. Regional matters are handled by the Regional Government of Callao, whose headquarters are located in front of the Jorge Chávez International Airport. Affairs such as city cleaning, promoting of sports and basic services are handled by the Provincial Municipality of Callao, which is headquartered in the Callao District. Also, each of the six districts has its own municipal government, which handles matters in their respective jurisdictional areas.

=== List of mayors ===
Since 2023, the incumbent mayor is Pedro Spadaro. The mayor of Callao represents both the province and the district.

Mayor	Party	Term	
Mayor	Party	Begin	End
Mayors of Callao (1556–1857)
Cristóbal Garzón (Note: As Alguacil del puerto.)	—N/a	1555	
Francisco López	—N/a	1 August 1556	
Mayors of the Constitutional Province of Callao
Manuel Cipriano Dulanto	—N/a	1857	1858
José Flores Guerra	—N/a	1858	1860
Enrique Higginson	—N/a	1860	1861
Gregorio Hurtado	—N/a	1861	1864
Gregorio Hurtado	—N/a	1867	1868
Nicolás Chuiliza	—N/a	1872	1873
Manuel Moscoso	—N/a	1872	1873
Adolfo Aramburú	—N/a	1874	1875
Wenceslao Venegas	—N/a	1876	1877
Jorge Arnaiz	—N/a	1877	1878
Jorge Alvarado	—N/a	1880	1882
Juan C. Peralta	—N/a	1883	1890
Wenceslao Venegas	—N/a	1887	1888
Hermógenes Maurtua	—N/a	1890	1892
Wenceslao Venegas	—N/a	1892	1893
Carlos Mackenzie	—N/a	1893	1895
Jorge Sharpe	—N/a	1895	1896
Faustino Piaggio	—N/a	1896	1898
Belisario Manrique	—N/a	1898	1902
Alejandro Mime	—N/a	1901	1902
Raúl de Saint Seine	—N/a	1902	1905
John J. Impett	—N/a	1905	1906
Adolfo Schulz	—N/a	1907	1908
Mino Berazzoni	—N/a	1908	1910
Santiago Greig	—N/a	1910	1911
Francisco Dammert	—N/a	1911	1912
Lincoln LaRosa	—N/a	1912	1913
Rafael Grau	—N/a	1913	1914
Victor M. Perez	—N/a	1915	1916
Alberto Secada	—N/a	1915	1916
Juan C. Peralta	—N/a	1916	1917
Juan E. Miller	—N/a	1917	1920
Francisco Dammert	—N/a	1920	1921
Juan M. Nosiglia	—N/a	1923	1926
Carlos Roe León	—N/a	1926	1927
César Velarde Labarrera	—N/a	1932	1933
Rufino Azpiazú	—N/a	1933	1935
Guillermo Gallo Porras	—N/a	1940	1944
Napoleón Muñoz	—N/a	1945	1946
Hernán Trisano	—N/a	1946	1947
Alberto Sabogal	—N/a	1948	1954
Carlos Nuñez del Arco	—N/a	1954	1955
Juan Andrés Arata	—N/a	1956	1957
Atilio Torchiani Nicolini	—N/a	1957	1958
Tomás M. Pizarro	—N/a	1958	1962
Manuel L. Arispe	—N/a	1962	1963
Oswaldo Winstanley Heredia	AP–DC	1 January 1964	31 December 1966
Jorge Labarthe Gonzáles	AP–DC	1 January 1967	31 December 1969
Eduardo Carrillo Burgos	—N/a	1969	1970
Enrique Madico Escudero	—N/a	1969	1970
Héctor Sabogal Sologuren	—N/a	1971	1974
Federico Gamboni Barrios	—N/a	1975	1975
Agustín Drago Herrada	—N/a	1976	1976
Alfonso Altet Torres	—N/a	1977	1978
Alfonso Santessi Crovetto	—N/a	1979	1980
Ricardo Muelle Maturana	Acción Popular	1 January 1981	31 December 1983
Miguel Monteverde Win	APRA	1 January 1984	31 December 1986
Urbano Julve Ciriaco	APRA	1 January 1987	31 December 1989
Kurt Woll Muller	FREDEMO	1 January 1990	31 December 1992
Kurt Woll Muller	PPC	1 January 1993	31 December 1995
Alexander Kouri Bumachar	Chim Pum Callao	1 January 1996	31 December 2006
Félix Moreno Caballero	Chim Pum Callao	1 January 2007	31 December 2010
Juan Sotomayor García	Chim Pum Callao	1 January 2011	31 December 2014
Juan Sotomayor García	Chim Pum Callao	1 January 2015	4 April 2018
Rafael Urbina Rivera	Chim Pum Callao	4 April 2018	31 December 2018
Pedro López Barrios	Por ti Callao	1 January 2019	31 December 2022
Pedro Spadaro Philipps	Contigo Callao	1 January 2023	Incumbent

=== Subdivisions ===
Callao is divided into seven districts, each of which is headed by a mayor.

N°	District	Population (2025 census)	Area km^{2}	Density (pers/km^{2})	Map
1	Callao (downtown)	487,920	45.65	9,147.60	Callao big div num
2	Bellavista	80,953	4.56	16 483.11	Callao big div num
3	Carmen de la Legua Reynoso	45,667	2.12	19,746.7	Callao big div num
4	La Perla	68,082	2.75	22,435.64	Callao big div num
5	La Punta	3,763	0.75	5,826.67	Callao big div num
6	Ventanilla	355,722	73.52	3,779.86	Callao big div num
7	Mi Perú	52,102	2.47	20,859.11	Callao big div num

The rest of Callao Region is composed of the islands of San Lorenzo, El Frontón, Cavinzas and Palomino, which all together have an area of 17.63 km^{2} (6.81 sq mi).

== Geography ==
Callao is built on and around the Peninsula of La Punta, where the district of the same name (and wealthy residential neighborhood) is located. The peninsula separates the bays of Miraflores and Callao.

=== Islands ===
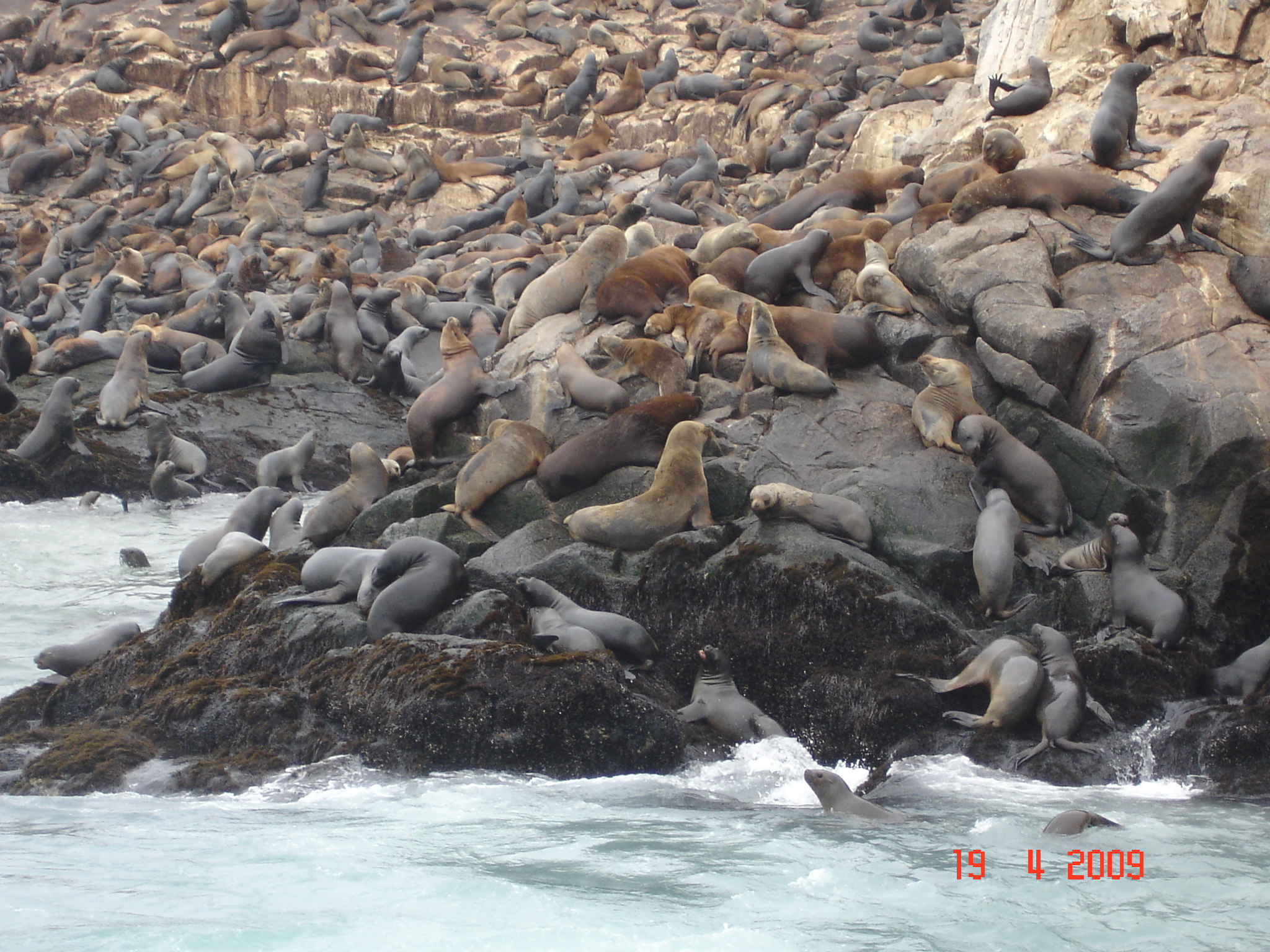
Sea lions in the Palomino Islands

Callao has several islands: San Lorenzo (currently a military base), El Frontón (a former high security prison), the Cavinzas Islands, and the Palomino Islands, where numerous sea lions and sea birds live in a virtually untouched ecosystem. There are proposed plans to build a huge naval, terrestrial, and air port on San Lorenzo Island. This project is called the San Lorenzo Megaport Project.

== Culture ==
Unlike other cities in the country, Callao does not commemorate a founding date. It commemorates its independence from the city of Lima and its elevation as an autonomous territory every 20 August.

=== Landmarks ===
A historical fortress, the Castillo de Real Felipe (site of "Rodil's Last Stand"), stands on the promontory overlooking the harbor.

A large naval base is sited in Callao. Its prison held Abimael Guzmán, the leader of the Shining Path Communist Party of Peru, and holds Vladimiro Montesinos, the ex-director of internal security during the Fujimori regime.

Jorge Chávez International Airport is located in Callao.

On a bluff overlooking the harbor sits Leoncio Prado Military Academy, the military high school. The city also has a university, the National University of Callao.

The main Naval Hospital, Centro Medico Naval is located on Avenida Venezuela in Bellavista. It contains the U.S. Navy command Naval Medical Research Unit Six; professional soccer clubs are Sport Boys and Atlético Chalaco.

== Demographics ==
=== Crime ===
Callao is one of the most dangerous areas in Peru and experiences the most crime. The main port city in Peru is known as one of the largest exit points of cocaine and is rife with organized crime that results in violence. In December 2015, the government declared Callao in a state of emergency that extended until April 2016, with more than 30 people being killed at the time. In 2016, the murder rate in Callao was double the national average; from 10.2 per 100,000 in 2011 to 15.2 in 2015, compared to Lima which saw 4.8 per 100,000 in 2011 and 5.0 per 100,000 in 2015. Despite government and cultural initiatives, crime has continued to increase in Callao, with some public events in the area ending in gunfire.

== Transportation ==
=== Airport ===
Jorge Chávez International Airport (IATA: LIM, ICAO: SPJC), known as Aeropuerto Internacional Jorge Chávez in Spanish, is Peru's main international and domestic airport. It is located in Callao district, 12 km (7.5 mi) northwest from the Historic Center of Lima. Callao is the port city now fully integrated with Lima, the nation's capital. In 2008, the airport handled 8,288,506 passengers and 98,733 aircraft movements. The airport was expanded in 2025 with the construction of a new terminal, increasing its capacity to 40 million passengers per year. The old terminal was closed and will be converted into a logistics center.

For many years it was the hub for now defunct Aeroperú and Compañía de Aviación Faucett, one of the oldest airlines in Latin America. Now it serves as a hub for many aviation companies such as Sky Airline Peru, Atsa Airlines, JetSmart Perú, Star Perú and LATAM Perú.

=== Rail ===
The port of Callao is served by the 4 ft 8 1/2 in (1,435 mm) standard gauge Ferrocarril Central Andino. The rail system connects to the Desamparados station in the center of Lima and ends in Huancayo. The rail station in Callao does not currently serve commercial service and instead is used for cargo.

== Notable people ==
- Alexander Callens (born 1992), Peruvian footballer
- Ángel Díaz Balbín (1955–1986), Peruvian triple murderer and suspected serial killer
- Luciana Fuster (born 1999), Peruvian model, television personality, and Miss Grand International 2023
- Mario Montalbetti (born 1953), Peruvian syntactician and linguistics professor
- Claudio Pizarro (born 1978), highest-scoring Latin American in the history of the Bundesliga
- Nolberto Solano (born 1974), Peruvian footballer and manager
- Yma Sumac (1922–2008), Peruvian musician
- Jhoao Ward (born 1989), Peruvian footballer

== See also ==
- Callao affair, 1820
- Battle of Callao (1838)
- Battle of Callao, 1866
- Blockades of Callao, several events
- Siege of Callao (disambiguation), several events
