= Callao District =

District of Callao, Peru

Coordinates: 12.0523°S 77.1391°W

Callao
- District
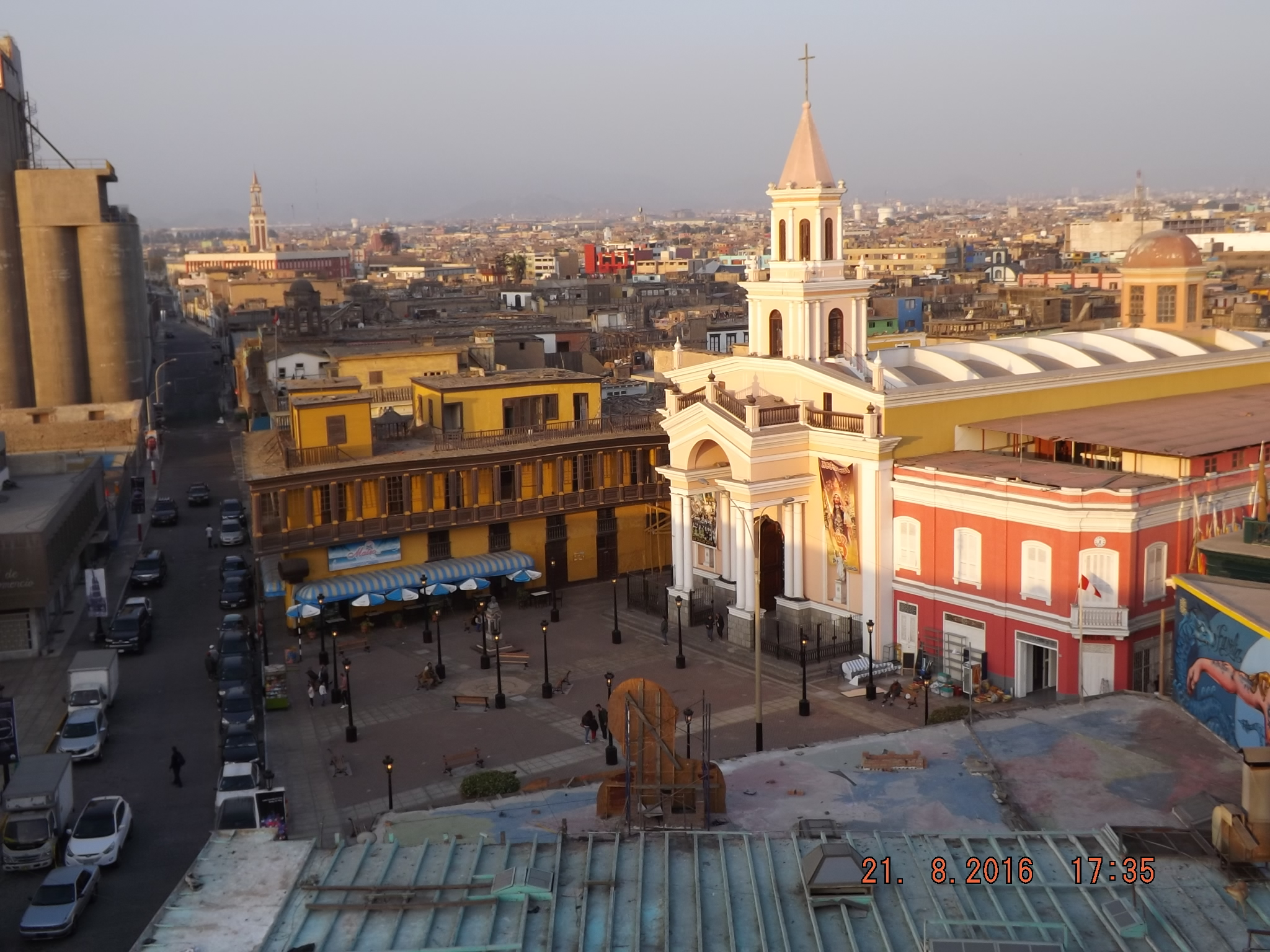

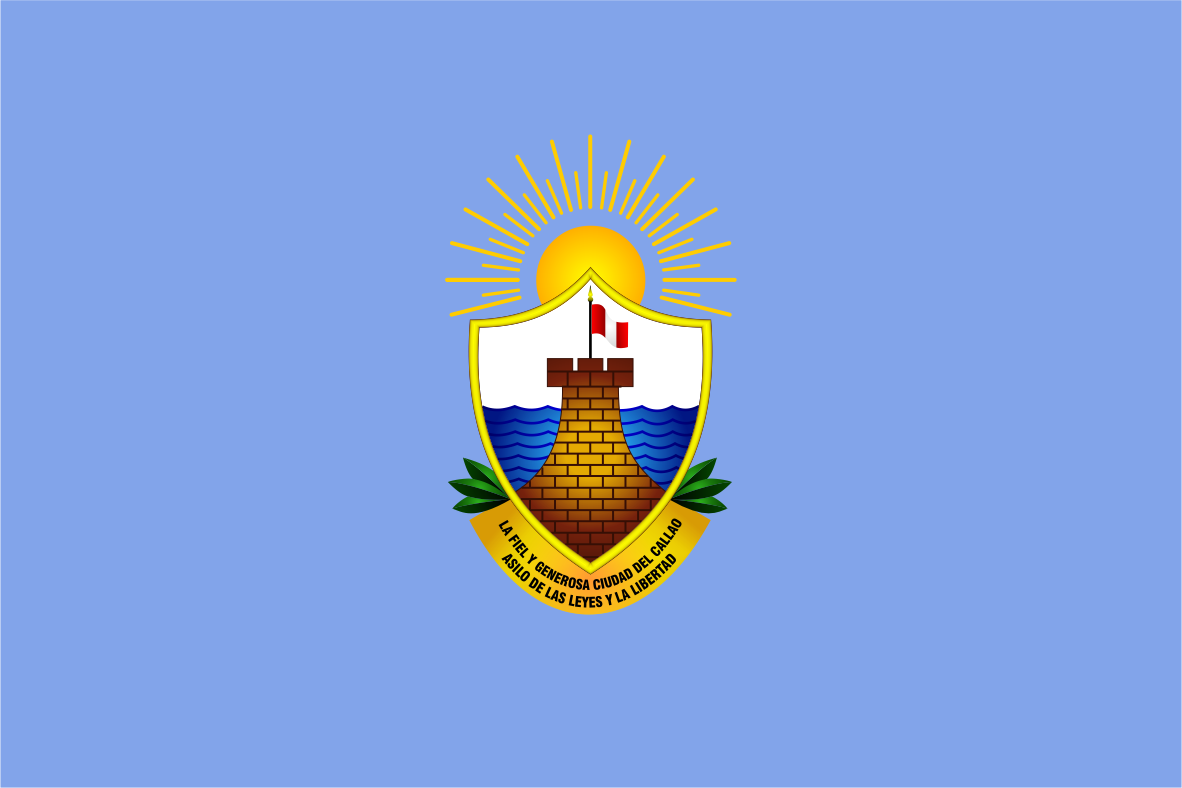
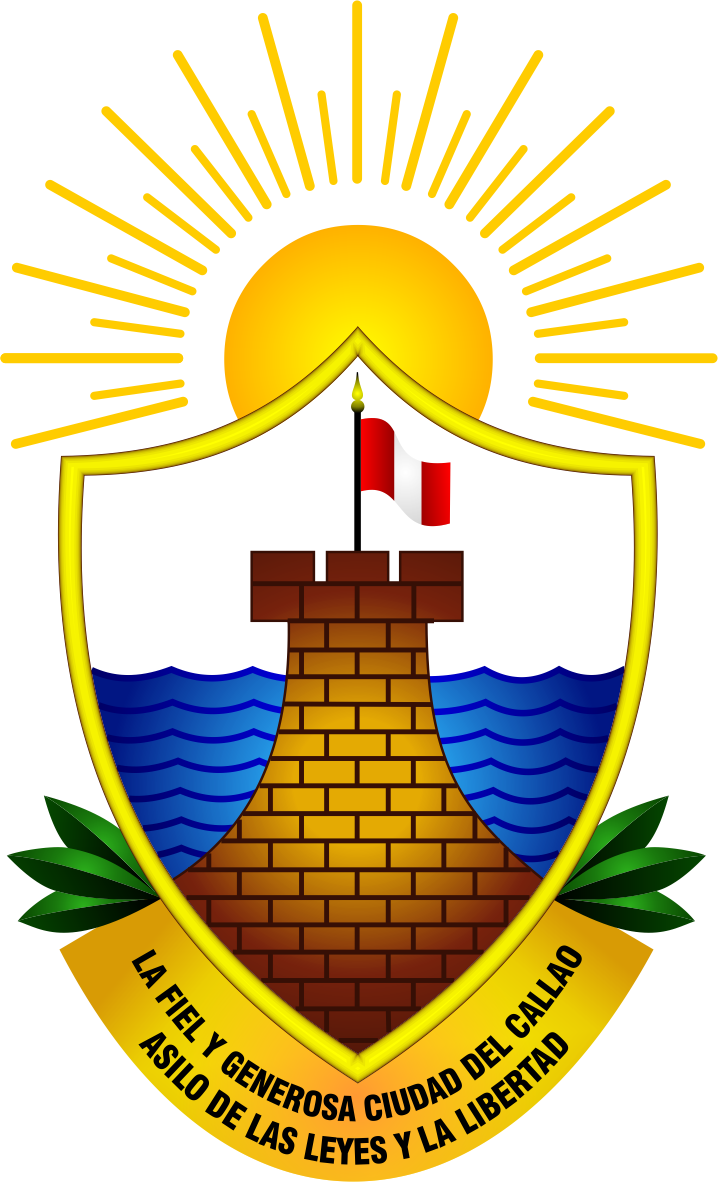
- Flag Coat of arms

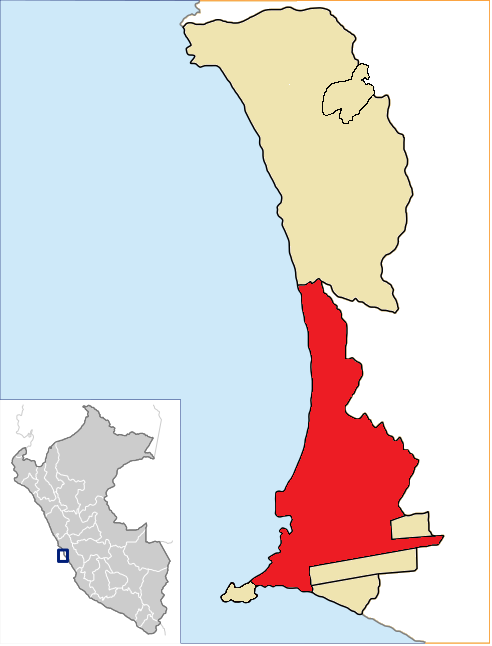
- Location in Callao
- Country: Peru
- Province: Callao
- Founded: August 20, 1836
- Capital: Callao
- Subdivisions: 1 populated center

Government
  - Mayor: Pedro López Barrios (2019–2022)

Area
  - Total: 45.65 km^{2} (17.63 sq mi)
- Elevation: 7 m (23 ft)

Population (2017)
  - Total: 451,260
  - Density: 9,885/km^{2} (25,600/sq mi)
- Time zone: UTC-5 (PET)
- UBIGEO: 070101
- Website: municallao.gob.pe

Callao is a district of Callao, Peru. Its creation dates back to 1836, and its territory currently includes Jorge Chávez International Airport and the Port of Callao, the country's main seaport. Consequently, Callao is the largest port of entry to Peru.

== History ==
In 1956, it expanded to the north, encompassing latifunds, lands and estates that belonged to the San Martín de Porres District and the Carabayllo District. During this expansion, the Jorge Chávez International Airport is built.

== Politics ==
The district is administered by the provincial municipality, which differs from its regional government, also headquartered in the district.

=== List of mayors ===
Since 2023, the incumbent mayor is Pedro Spadaro.

== Geography ==
=== Boundaries ===
The Chillón River marks the district's northern border with Ventanilla. On the east, the Callao district is bordered by the Carmen de la Legua-Reynoso as well as the Lima Province's districts of San Martín de Porres and Lima. The Bellavista and the La Perla districts are located to the southeast, while La Punta borders the district on the west. The Pacific Ocean borders the province on the west and south.

=== Territorial dispute ===
In 1956, due to the expansion of the Constitutional Province of Callao over the territory of the Lima Province through Law No. 125382, two conflict zones emerged, one with the Lima District and the other with the San Martín de Porres District. This dispute arose from the imprecision in the wording of the boundaries and the lack of cartography of the law, in addition to the disappearance of the original stone milestones due to the urbanization process. The conflict or indetermination of limits remains in force, as it corresponds to a district-provincial struggle, and is waiting to be fully defined by the Metropolitan Municipality of Lima, the Regional Government of Callao, the Provincial Municipality of Callao, the Municipality of San Martín de Porres, the Presidency of the Council of Ministers and the Congress of the Republic.

==== Conflict with Lima District ====
The area in territorial conflict with the district of Lima has a linear extension of 0.35 kilometers and is mainly located in a section of Moreau street between Argentina and Benavides avenues. The areas in dispute are for residential, commercial and industrial use, they are developed in two blocks of this street, which the Metropolitan Municipality of Lima currently provides services in addition to having carried out the corresponding numbering and signage.

==== Conflict with San Martin de Porres District ====
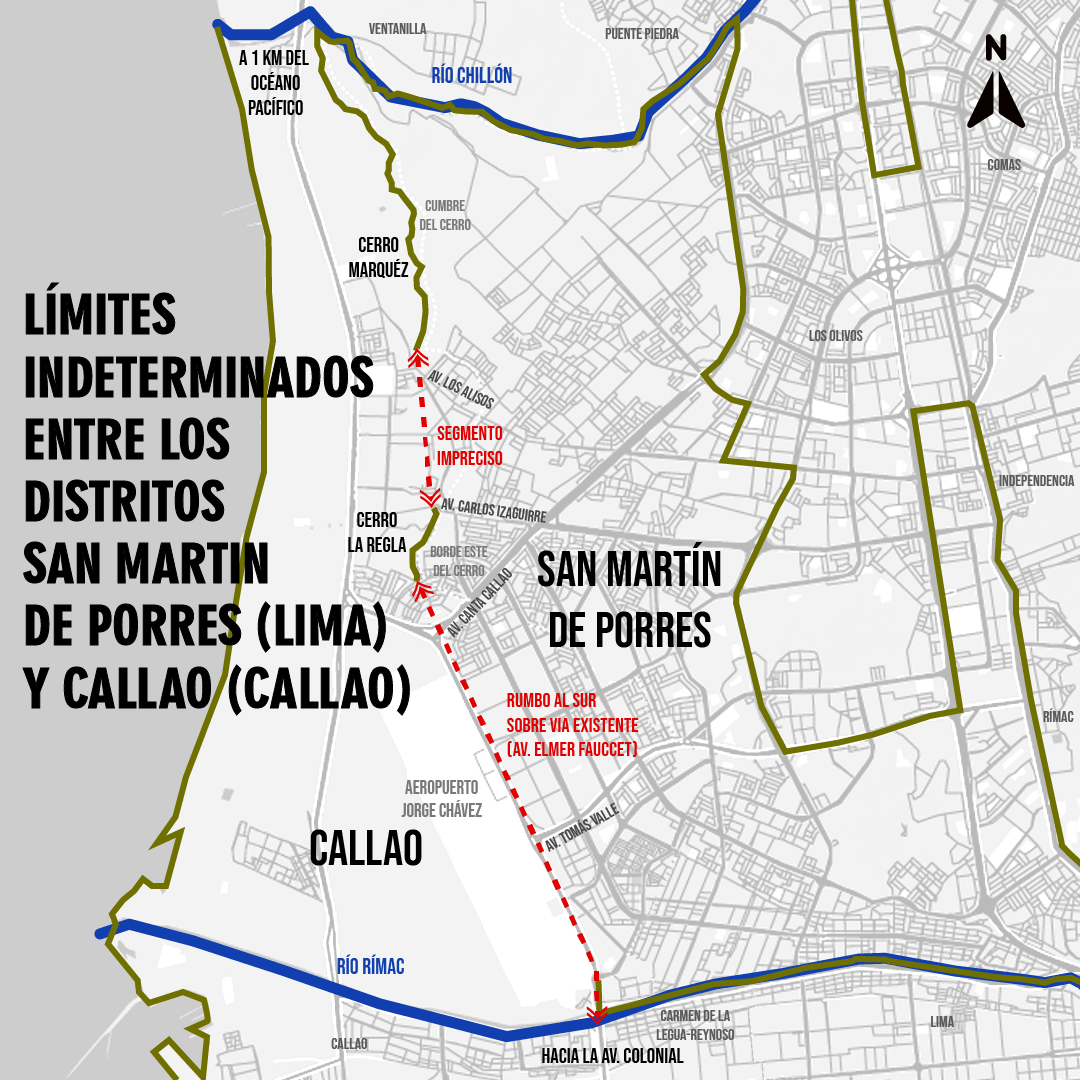
Disputed area of the Callao District and the San Martin de Porres District.

The area in territorial conflict with the San Martin de Porres district has a linear extension of approximately 11 kilometers and is located in two segments between the summit of Cerro Márquez to Cerro La Regla and from the eastern edge of Cerro La Regla to the Rímac River.

The first mentioned segment begins between passing through the summit of Cerro Márquez until entering Cerro La Regla. In this area, since 2000, settlements and urbanizations have been developed such as Floresta de Oquendo, Villas de Oquendo, Costa Azul, Palmeras de Oquendo, among others that are located between Alameda Central and Bertello avenues and archaeological sites such as the Inca Palace of Oquendo.

The second mentioned segment is from the eastern edge of Cerro La Regla moving south, crossing the Rímac River until reaching Colonial Avenue. In this area, since 1980, the El Álamo, Las Fresas, Sesquicentenario, Industrial Bocanegra, Santa Rosa, Bocanegra urbanizations have been developed, among others, which are located between Cuzco and Faucett avenues, close to the Jorge Chávez Airport.

== See also ==
- Administrative divisions of Peru
