= Pedro Spadaro =

Peruvian politician

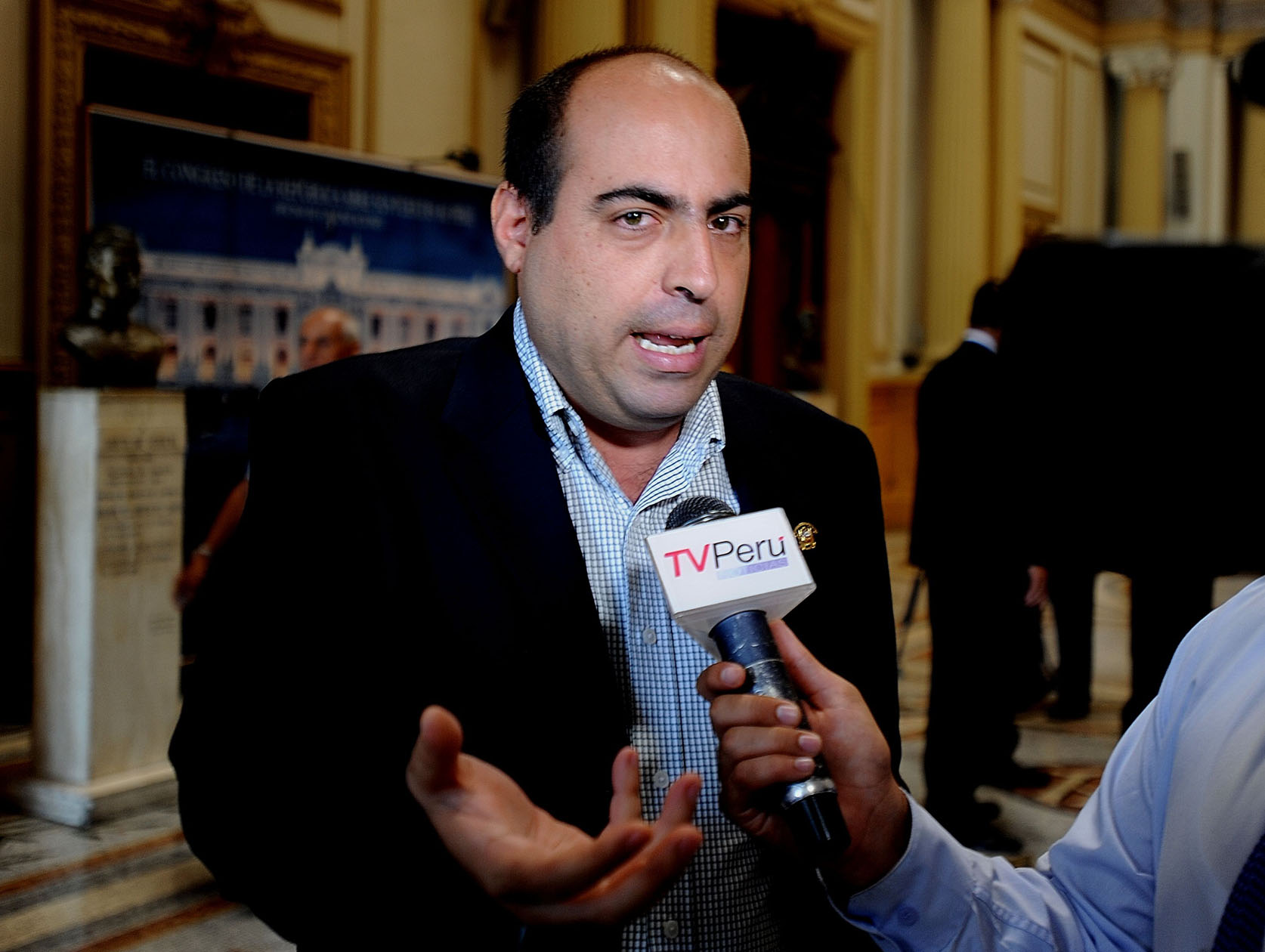
- Spadaro speaking to the Press in 2012

Mayor of Callao
- Incumbent
- Assumed office 1 January 2023
- Preceded by: Pedro López Barrios

Mayor of Ventanilla
- In office 1 January 2019 – 21 December 2022
- Preceded by: Omar Marcos Arteaga
- Succeeded by: Jhovinson Vásquez

Member of Congress
- In office 26 July 2011 – 26 July 2016
- Constituency: Callao

Personal details
- Born: Pedro Carmelo Spadaro Philipps; 16 May 1977 (age 49) Lima, Peru
- Party: Popular Force
- Education: University of San Martín de Porres
- Occupation: Politician

Pedro Carmelo Spadaro Philipps (born 16 May 1977) is a Peruvian lawyer and Fujimorist politician and a former Congressman, representing the Constitutional Province of Callao between 2011 and 2016. Spadaro served as Mayor of Ventanilla from 2019 and 2022. He is the current mayor of Callao.

== Biography ==
In 2000 he graduated as a lawyer from the University of San Martín de Porres. He completed a specialization course in municipal management at the Lima Bar Association in 2001, and completed part of a master's degree at the University of Piura.

== Political career ==
=== Early political career ===
In the 2002 regional elections, he unsuccessfully ran for a position as councilor for the La Perla District for the La Perla Independent Movement. Between 2004 and 2006 he was general manager and advisor to the Callao regional presidency, when it was occupied by Rogelio Canches. In the legislative elections of 2006 and in those of 2010 he ran, in both cases without success, for the position of mayor of the Ventanilla District, at the first opportunity by the Movimiento Amplio Regional Callao (Mar Callao), a party founded and directed by Canches, and in the second by Mi Callao.

=== Congressman ===
In the 2011 elections, he ran for a seat in Congress under the Force 2011 party of Keiko Fujimori, representing the Constitutional Province of Callao and was elected for the 2011–2016 term.

He has made several criticisms of Susana Villarán’s municipal management of Lima (2011-2014), claiming that state resources are being misused.

=== Mayor of Ventanilla ===
In the municipal and regional elections held on October 7, 2018, he was elected mayor of Ventanilla by the "Fuerza Chalaca" Regional Movement, a movement created and chaired by Omar Marcos Arteaga.
