= Bellavista District =

District of Callao, Peru

Coordinates: 12.0624°S 77.1286°W

Bellavista
- District
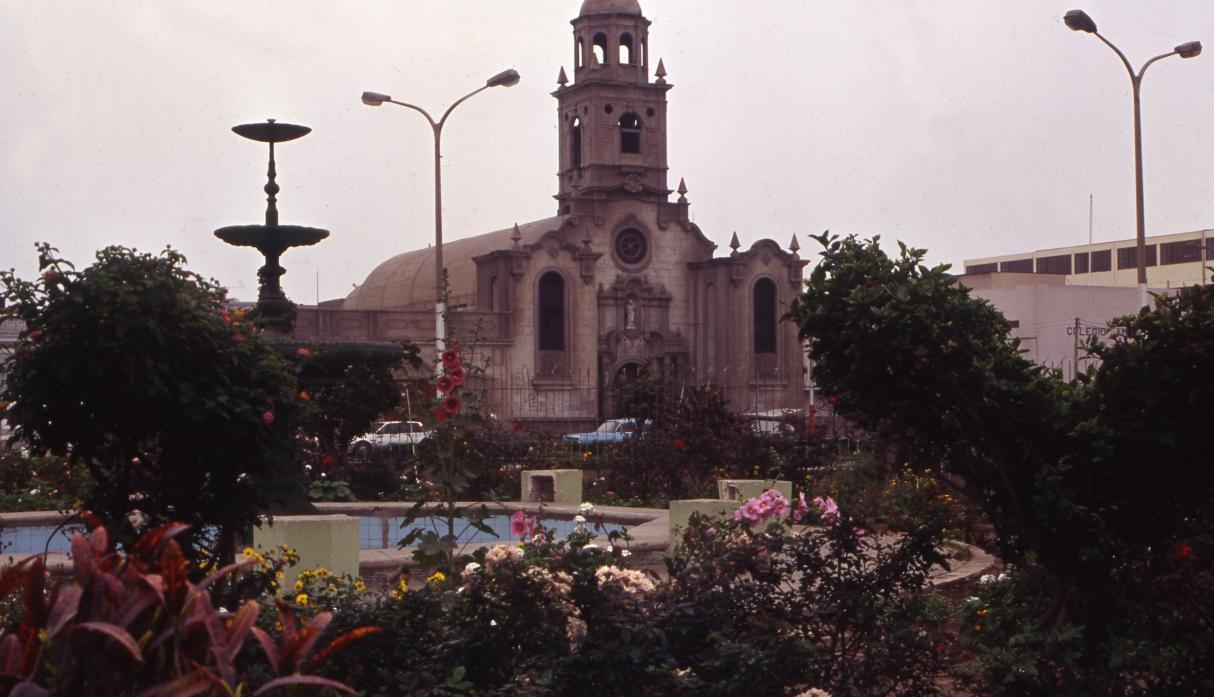
- View of San José Church

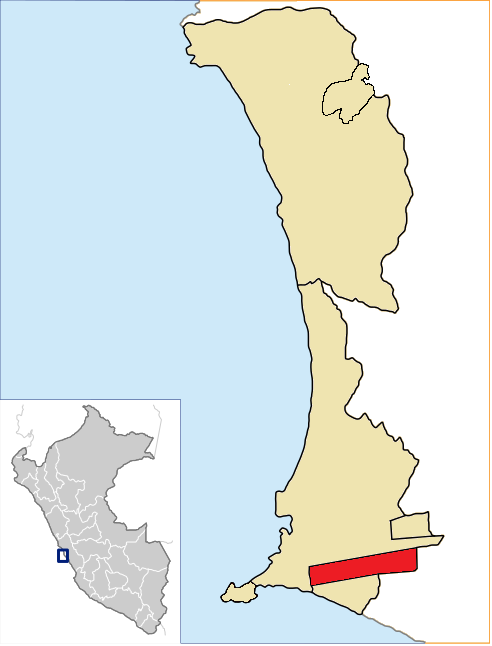
- Location in Callao
- Country: Peru
- Province: Callao
- Capital: Bellavista
- Subdivisions: 4 sectors

Government
  - Mayor: Alexander Callán

Area
  - Total: 4.56 km^{2} (1.76 sq mi)
- Elevation: 34 m (112 ft)

Population (2017)
  - Total: 74,851
  - Density: 16,400/km^{2} (42,500/sq mi)
- Time zone: UTC-5 (PET)
- UBIGEO: 070102
- Website: www.munibellavista.gob.pe

Bellavista is a district of Callao, Peru. It is the province's second oldest district, having been created in 1915.

== History ==
The district was created in 1915.

The Navy's Medical Centre (CMST), named after surgeon Major Santiago Távara, was inaugurated in 1956 to provide health care for leaders and subordinates of the Peruvian Navy.

== Geography ==
The district has a total land area of 4.56 km^{2}. Its administrative center is located 34 meters above sea level.

=== Boundaries ===
Bellavista is the only district in the Callao to have an almost perfect geometrical shape, as it is a rectangle where the southern border with both the Lima Province and La Perla is marked by Avenida Venezuela.

On the north, Avenida Oscar Benavides (formerly known as Avenida Colonial) marks the district's border with the Callao District, which it also borders on the west in Jr. Andrés Santiago Vigil. On the east, the district ends at the Santiago Tábara Naval Hospital or the western perimeter of the National University of San Marcos, where the Lima Province (or more specifically, the Lima District) begins.

Bellavista can be divided into four sections, from west to east: Bellavista Cercado (downtown, the historical section), Ciudad del Pescador ("Fisherman City"), Jardines de Virú ("Virů Gardens"), and San Joaquín-San José. Estadio Miguel Grau, the largest stadium in Callao Province, is located between Cercado and Ciudad del Pescador.

== Law and government ==
=== Governance ===
The official offices of the Callao Regional Government are located in Bellavista.

The current mayor of the district is Daniel Malpartida.

=== Crime ===
Callao is one of the areas of Peru that experiences the most crime due to its designation as the main port city in Peru, it is known as one of the largest exit points of cocaine and is rife with organized crime that results with violence. In 2016, the murder rate in Callao was double the national average. In 2023, a raid by the Peruvian National Police found 3 tons of cocaine located in a home in Bellavista.

== Demographics ==
According to the 2005 census by the INEI, the district had 72,761 inhabitants, and a population density of 15,956.4 persons/km^{2}.
