= List of bridges in Peru =

This is a list of bridges and viaducts in Peru, including those for pedestrians and vehicular traffic.

== Historical and architectural interest bridges ==
	Name	Distinction	Length	Type	Carries Crosses	Opened	Location	Department	Ref.
1	Inca Bridge	Old secret entrance to Machu Picchu; World Heritage Site		Beam bridge Wood	Footbridge		Aguas Calientes; 13°09′50.7″S 72°32′56.7″W	Cuzco	
2	Queshuachaca	Last remaining Inca rope bridge	45 m (148 ft)	Simple suspension Grass ropes	Footbridge; Apurímac River		Quehue District; 14°22′52.8″S 71°29′02.5″W	Cuzco	
3	Uchumayo Bridge	Devil’s Bridge		Masonry; 1 semi-circular arch	Chili river	1604	Uchumayo District; 16°25′36.1″S 71°40′29.7″W	Arequipa	
4	Puente de Piedra	Historic Centre of Lima; World Heritage Site	115 m (377 ft)	Masonry; 4 semi-circular arches (6 originally)	Road bridge Rímac River	1610	Lima; 12°02′35.8″S 77°01′47.0″W	Department of Lima	
5	Francisco Bolognesi Bridge			Masonry; 5 semi-circular arches	Road bridge Chili river	1608	Arequipa; 16°23′51.5″S 71°32′30.5″W	Arequipa	
6	Pachachaca Bridge		36 m (118 ft)	Masonry; 1 semi-circular arch	Road bridge Pachachaca River	1654	Abancay; 13°39′47.5″S 72°56′14.8″W	Apurímac	
7	Bolívar Bridge		484 m (1,588 ft)	Trestle bridge Puddled iron, Fink truss	Road bridge Former Ferrocarril del Sur; Chili river	1871	Arequipa; 16°24′37.7″S 71°32′52.2″W	Arequipa	
8	First Verrugas Bridge collapsed in 1889	Height : 77 m (253 ft)	175 m (574 ft)	Trestle bridge Wrought iron, Fink truss	Lima–La Oroya railway Verrugas Canyon	1873	San Bartolome District–Santiago de Surco; 11°53′21.5″S 76°29′13.8″W	Department of Lima	
9	El Infiernillo Bridge		63 m (207 ft)	Truss; Steel	Lima–La Oroya railway	1908	San Mateo District; 11°44′21.7″S 76°16′52.6″W	Department of Lima	
10	Chaupichaca Bridge		123 m (404 ft)	Truss; Steel	Lima–La Oroya railway	1909	San Mateo District; 11°47′12.4″S 76°19′02.6″W	Department of Lima	
11	Verrugas Bridge	Height : 80 m (260 ft)	218 m (715 ft)	Truss; Steel	Lima–La Oroya railway Verrugas Canyon	1937	San Bartolome District–Santiago de Surco; 11°53′20.8″S 76°29′13.9″W	Department of Lima	

== Major road and railway bridges ==
The modular suspension bridges have a great success in Peru, the type of bridge developed by the Austrian company Waagner-Biro has the advantage of being simple and quick to implement. These bridges can be made by locals or unskilled workers, the components are fixed and assembled on site, so no welding is required. The company was in charge of building the longest suspension bridge in the country, the Continental Bridge (also known as the President Guillermo Billinghurst Bridge), the elements of which were delivered in 1981, but for political reasons the project did not resume until 2004 and the inauguration took place in 2011. This bridge is part of the Interoceanic Highway which provides a link between Brazil and Peru.

The company SIMA (Shipyard Marine Industrial Services) specialized in shipbuilding, has an important activity in the construction of bridges in Peru, it has produced nearly 300 metal bridges across the country (2013).

This table presents the structures with spans greater than 100 metres (330 ft) (non-exhaustive list).

	Name	Span	Length	Type	Carries Crosses	Opened	Location	Department	Ref.
1	Continental Bridge	320 m (1,050 ft)	723 m (2,372 ft)	Suspension; Steel truss deck, steel pylons, concrete piers 104+320+104	Road PE-30C; Interoceánica Sur; Madre de Dios River	2011	Puerto Maldonado; 12°35′26.3″S 69°10′25.4″W	Madre de Dios	
2	Nanay Bridge	241 m (791 ft)	1,941 m (6,368 ft)	Cable-stayed; Composite steel/concrete deck, concrete pylons 91+241+91	Road PE-5N I Nanay River	2021	Iquitos; 3°41′43.2″S 73°15′17.4″W	Loreto	
3	Punta Arenas Bridge	220 m (720 ft)	271 m (889 ft)	Suspension; Steel truss deck, steel pylons	Road PE-5N; Huallaga River	1975	Campanilla District; 7°31′45.4″S 76°40′17.4″W	San Martín	
4	Tocache Bridge	220 m (720 ft)	220 m (720 ft)	Suspension; Steel truss deck, steel pylons	Road PE-5N; Huallaga River	1975	Tocache; 8°11′12.6″S 76°30′26.4″W	San Martín	
5	Picota Bridge	220 m (720 ft)		Suspension; Steel truss girder deck, steel pylons	Road bridge Huallaga River	1984	Picota; 6°55′34.5″S 76°19′44.0″W	San Martín	
6	Huallaga Bridge under construction	220 m (720 ft)	408 m (1,339 ft)	Cable-stayed; Composite steel/concrete deck, concrete pylons 87+220+87	Road bridge Huallaga River	2023	Saint Lucia; 8°20′44.5″S 76°22′59.0″W	San Martín	
7	New Aguaytía Bridge	200 m (660 ft)	576 m (1,890 ft)	Suspension; Steel truss deck, steel pylons	Road PE-5N; Aguaytía River	2000	Aguaytía; 9°02′14.2″S 75°30′18.0″W	Ucayali	
8	Bellavista Bridge	190 m (620 ft)	320 m (1,050 ft)	Cable-stayed; Composite steel/concrete deck, concrete pylons	Road bridge Huallaga River	2010	Bellavista; 7°04′09.1″S 76°34′53.8″W	San Martín	
9	Palcazú Bridge	180 m (590 ft)	260 m (850 ft)	Suspension; Steel truss deck, steel pylons	Road PE-5N; Palcazu River		Ciudad Constitución; 9°51′02.6″S 75°00′57.9″W	Pasco	
10	Pachitea Bridge	180 m (590 ft)	356 m (1,168 ft)	Extradosed; Composite steel/concrete deck, steel pylons and cable-stays 88+180+88	Road PE-5NH; Pachitea River	2016	Puerto Inca; 9°23′15.9″S 74°58′03.7″W	Huánuco	
11	Inambari Bridge	160 m (520 ft)	173 m (568 ft)	Suspension; Steel truss deck, steel pylons	Road PE-30C; Interoceánica Sur; Inambari River	1966	Puerto Leguía; 13°11′07.9″S 70°23′03.2″W	Puno; Madre de Dios	
12	Comuneros Bridge	160 m (520 ft)	524 m (1,719 ft)	Cable-stayed; Composite steel/concrete deck, concrete pylons 70+160+70	Road bridge Mantaro River	2019	Huancayo; 12°05′31.9″S 75°13′56.1″W	Junín	
13	Chamorro Bridge	160 m (520 ft)	160 m (520 ft)	Arch; Steel tied arch Bow-string bridge	Road bridge Matagente River	2022	El Carmen District–Chincha Baja District; 13°30′09.8″S 76°06′41.6″W	Ica	
14	Chilina Bridge	157 m (515 ft)	562 m (1,844 ft)	Box girder Prestressed concrete Twin bridges 100+157+142+102	Road bridge Quilca River	2014	Arequipa; 16°22′54.4″S 71°32′04.7″W	Arequipa	
15	Santa Martha Bridge	150 m (490 ft)	150 m (490 ft)	Suspension; Steel truss girder deck, steel pylons	Road PE-5N; Huayllabamba River	1983	Lopuna; 7°16′05.8″S 76°44′14.1″W	San Martín	
16	Yanango Bridge (1998) collapsed in 2005	150 m (490 ft)	150 m (490 ft)	Cable-stayed; Steel girder deck, 1 steel pylon	Road PE-22B; Yanango River	1998	San Ramón; 11°12′30.8″S 75°29′12.1″W	Junín	
17	Bolognesi Bridge	150 m (490 ft)	150 m (490 ft)	Arch; Steel tied arch Bow-string bridge	Road bridge Avenida Bolognesi; Piura River	2002	Piura; 5°12′03.0″S 80°37′31.6″W	Piura	
18	Pizana Bridge	150 m (490 ft)	150 m (490 ft)	Suspension; Steel truss girder deck, steel pylons	Road PE-5N; Huallaga River		Pizana; 8°00′31.2″S 76°38′58.6″W	San Martín	
19	Antonio Raimondi Bridge	150 m (490 ft)	150 m (490 ft)	Arch; Steel tied arch Bow-string bridge	Road PE-12B; Marañón River	2018	Quiches District–Taurija District; 8°20′31.4″S 77°27′30.5″W	Ancash; La Libertad	
20	Santa María de Nieva Bridge	150 m (490 ft)	242 m (794 ft)	Suspension; Steel truss girder deck, steel pylons	Road bridge Nieva River		Santa María de Nieva; 4°36′15.7″S 77°52′05.4″W	Amazonas	
21	Maranura Bridge	145 m (476 ft)	202 m (663 ft)	Arch; Concrete deck arch	Road PE-28B; Urubamba River	2021	Maranura District; 12°57′50.7″S 72°39′59.3″W	Cuzco	
22	Puerto Ocopa Bridge	140 m (460 ft)	163 m (535 ft)	Arch; Steel through arch	Road PE-5S; Perené River	2016	Puerto Ocopa; 11°08′01.3″S 74°18′56.9″W	Junín	
23	Otorongo Bridge	130 m (430 ft)		Suspension; Steel truss girder deck, steel pylons	Road PE-34B; Inambari River		Puerto Leguía; 13°11′39.0″S 70°23′09.2″W	Puno; Madre de Dios	
24	Ubiriki Bridge	125 m (410 ft)	125 m (410 ft)	Arch; Steel tied arch Bow-string bridge	Road bridge Perené River	2014	Bajo Aldea; 10°51′46.9″S 74°59′17.8″W	Junín	
25	Calemar Bridge	120 m (390 ft)	120 m (390 ft)	Arch; Steel tied arch Bow-string bridge	Road PE-10B; Marañón River	2018	Calemar; 7°31′19.4″S 77°43′44.6″W	La Libertad	
26	Chinchipe Bridge	120 m (390 ft)	120 m (390 ft)	Arch; Steel tied arch Bow-string bridge	Road bridge Chinchipe River	2019	San José de Lourdes District; 5°06′38.9″S 78°56′27.2″W	Cajamarca	
27	Paranapura Bridge	110 m (360 ft)	110 m (360 ft)	Arch; Steel tied arch Bow-string bridge	Road bridge Paranapura River	2013	Yurimaguas; 5°52′16.5″S 76°07′55.5″W	Loreto	
28	Brazil–Peru Integration Bridge	110 m (360 ft)	240 m (790 ft)	Extradosed; Concrete box girder deck, concrete pylons 65+110+65	Road PE-30C; Acre River	2005	Iñapari–Assis Brasil; 10°56′29.1″S 69°34′37.4″W	Madre de Dios; Brazil	
29	Cunyac Bridge	108 m (354 ft)	108 m (354 ft)	Suspension; Steel truss girder deck, steel pylons	Road PE-3S; Apurímac River	1987	Curahuasi District–Mollepata District; 13°33′45.6″S 72°34′30.6″W	Apurímac; Cuzco	
30	Yanango Bridge	107 m (351 ft)	107 m (351 ft)	Suspension; Steel truss girder deck, steel pylons	Road PE-22B; Yanango River		San Ramón; 11°12′33.3″S 75°29′09.6″W	Junín	
31	Perené Bridge	102 m (335 ft)	102 m (335 ft)	Suspension; Steel truss girder deck, steel pylons	Road bridge Perené River	2018	Pichanaki; 10°59′47.2″S 74°45′30.7″W	Junín	
32	Army Bridge	105 m (344 ft)	105 m (344 ft)	Arch; Steel tied arch Bow-string bridge Twin bridges	Road bridge Avenida Alfonso Ugarte; Rímac River	2010	Lima; 12°02′19.6″S 77°02′36.5″W	Department of Lima	
33	Chacanto Bridge	100 m (330 ft)	108 m (354 ft)	Arch; Concrete through arch	Road PE-8B; Marañón River	2020	Utco District–Balsas District; 6°50′58.9″S 78°01′46.3″W	Lima; Amazonas	

== See also ==
- Transport in Peru
- Highways in Peru
- Rail transport in Peru
- Geography of Peru
- List of rivers of Peru

== Notes and references ==
- Notes
- Nicolas Janberg. "International Database for Civil and Structural Engineering". Structurae.com.
- "Infraestructura Peruana". Infraestructuraperuana.blogspot.com (in Spanish).
- Others references
