= Highway 1 (Peru) =

Highway in Peru

Longitudinal Axis PE-1
- Eje longitudinal PE-1
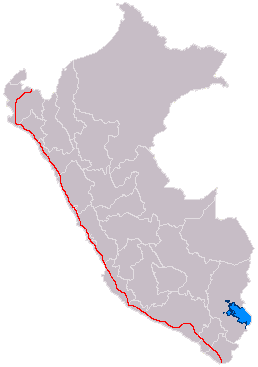

Route information
- Maintained by Ministry of Transportation and Communications
- Length: 4,146 km (2,576 mi)
- Existed: 1932–present

Major junctions
- From: Aguas Verdes, Tumbes
- To: Santa Rosa, Tacna

Location
- Country: Peru
- Major cities: Sullana, Piura, Chiclayo, Trujillo, Chimbote, Lima, Ica, Nazca, Camaná, Moquegua, Tacna

Highway system
- Highways in Peru

Longitudinal Axis PE-1 (Spanish: Eje longitudinal PE-1), commonly known as the Pan-American Highway (Spanish: Carretera Panamericana), is the most important highway in Peru, forming part of the larger Pan-American Highway. It is one of three roads that cross the country from north to south, connecting the country's border with Ecuador with Bolivia and Chile.

== Name ==
The highway's official designations are "PE-1" (itself divided into " PE-1N" and " PE-1S" when it passes through Lima) and "Longitudinal de la Costa" as it is one of three longitudinal roads in the country, each passing through one of the country's three traditional regions. The name "Pan-American Highway" (Spanish: Carretera Panamericana) is also commonly used and, as the road is divided into two, the names "Northern Pan-American Highway" (Spanish: Carretera Panamericana Norte) and "Southern Pan-American Highway" (Spanish: Carretera Panamericana Sur) are used for their respective parts.

In Lima, a path that formerly served as part of the highway which has since been replaced by a more appropriate road due to city's growth is now known by a number of different names, two of which share the title of "Former Pan-American Highway" (Spanish: Antigua Carretera Panamericana). This route was divided into the following roads:

- Túpac Amaru Avenue (Spanish: Avenida Túpac Amaru) is located north of Rímac River, and was originally a standalone road built to connect the city with Ancón. It is now named after the Inca figure of the same name. It is now labeled PE-20A after passing the Chimpu Ocllo Avenue.
- Caquetá Avenue (Spanish: Avenida Caquetá) was originally inaugurated as an extension of an avenue to the south of the Puente del Ejército. It was named after a region that had been recently the subject of a dispute with Colombia.
- Paseo de la República Avenue (Spanish: Avenida Paseo de la República) connects the city centre with the road to Barranco and Chorrillos.
- Republic of Panama Avenue (Spanish: Avenida República de Panamá) passes through the city's central districts, crossing into Barranco. It is named after the country of the same name.
- Francisco Bolognesi Avenue (Spanish: Avenida Francisco Bolognesi) connects Barranco with Chorrillos. It is named after the Peruvian general of the same name.
- Military School Avenue (Spanish: Avenida Escuela Militar) crosses Chorrillos, and is continued by a non-connected continuation road of Paseo de la República Avenue. It is named after the military school in the district. It follows the path of the Inca road system.
- Defensores del Morro Avenue (Spanish: Avenida Defensores del Morro), formerly Huaylas, crosses the district until it reaches the highway's path. It is named after the Battle of Arica, formerly after the valley of the same name.

The route is continued outside of the city's central urban area by a road that runs parallel to the current highway's path, known simply as the "Former Southern Pan-American Highway" (Spanish: Antigua Carretera Panamericana Sur).

== Route ==
=== Northern Highway ===
This road is the Peruvian portion of the Pan-American Highway. Officially named PE-1N, it runs north–south through the whole length of the country and connects all major cities in the country's coastal area. The northern terminus of the highway is located in the Macará International Bridge (Piura) at the border with Ecuador. Starting in this point, the highway is known as Carretera Panamericana Norte ("North Pan-American Highway").

=== Lima ===
The highway crosses coastal and central Lima, the country's capital. Once it reaches a roundabout in Santa Anita, the Northern part of the highway stops. Going south from this point, the highway is officially called PE-1S.

The section between Caquetá (Habich, according to the concessionaire) and Javier Prado avenues is called the Vía de Evitamiento and is licensed to Lima Expresa, from the French group Vinci SA.

=== Southern Highway ===
The Southern part of the highway continues from the roundabout in Lima until it reaches the southern terminus, located in the Santa Rosa Border Post, in the Department of Tacna at the border with Chile.

== See also ==
- Carretera Central (Peru)
