= Independencia District, Lima =

District in Lima, Peru

Coordinates: 11°59′30″S 77°03′00″W

Independencia
- District
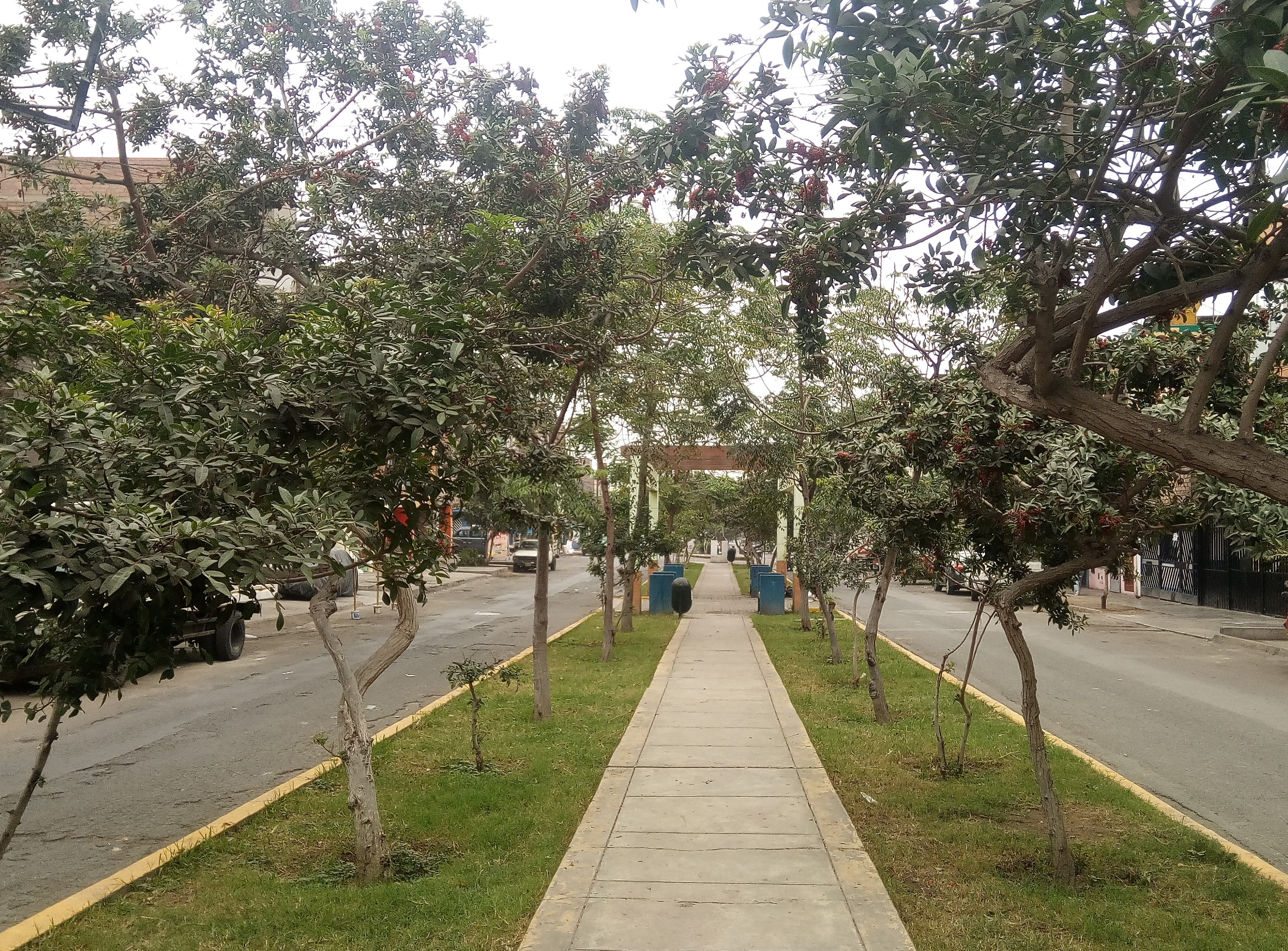
- Main Square of Independencia

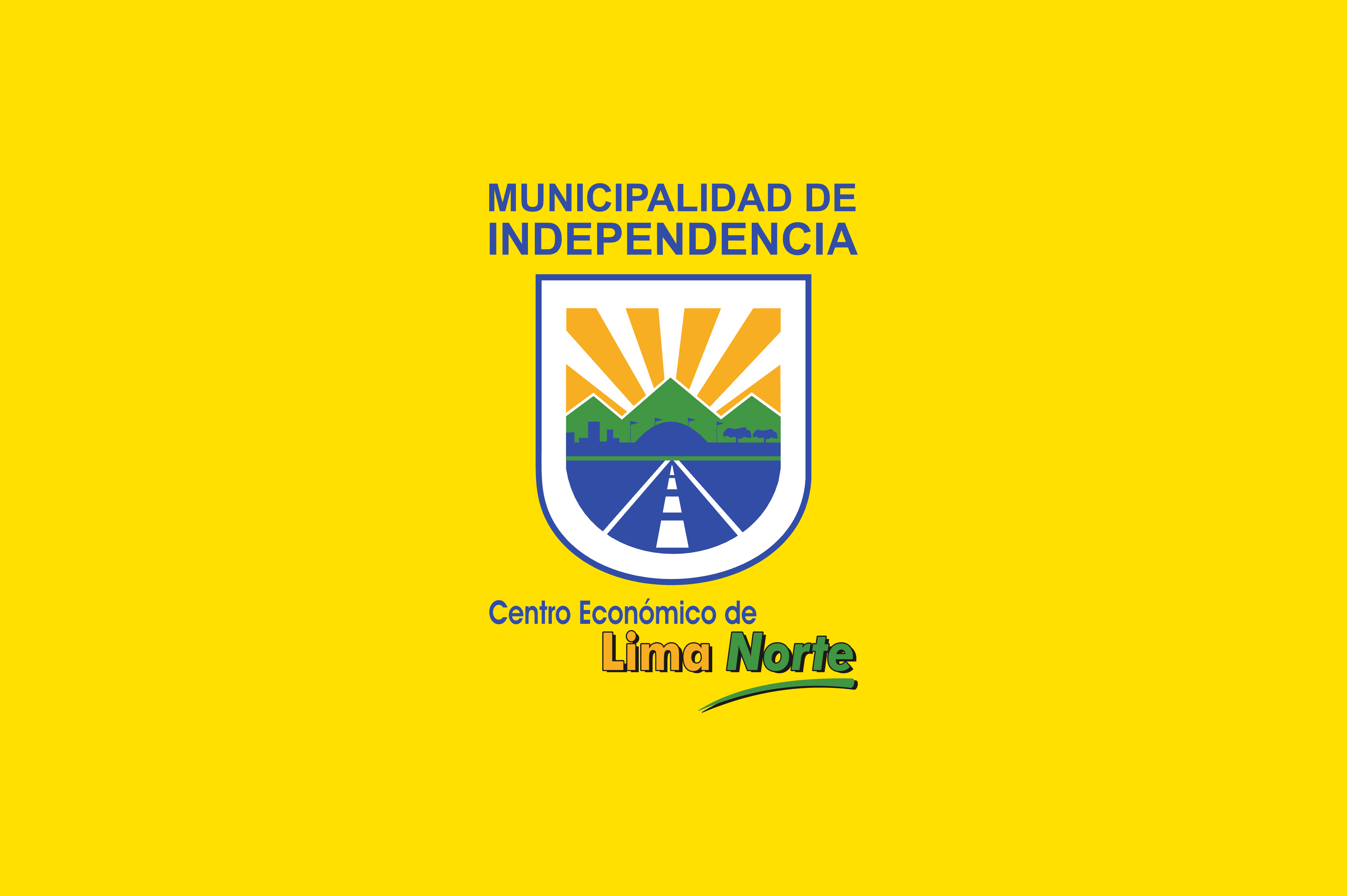
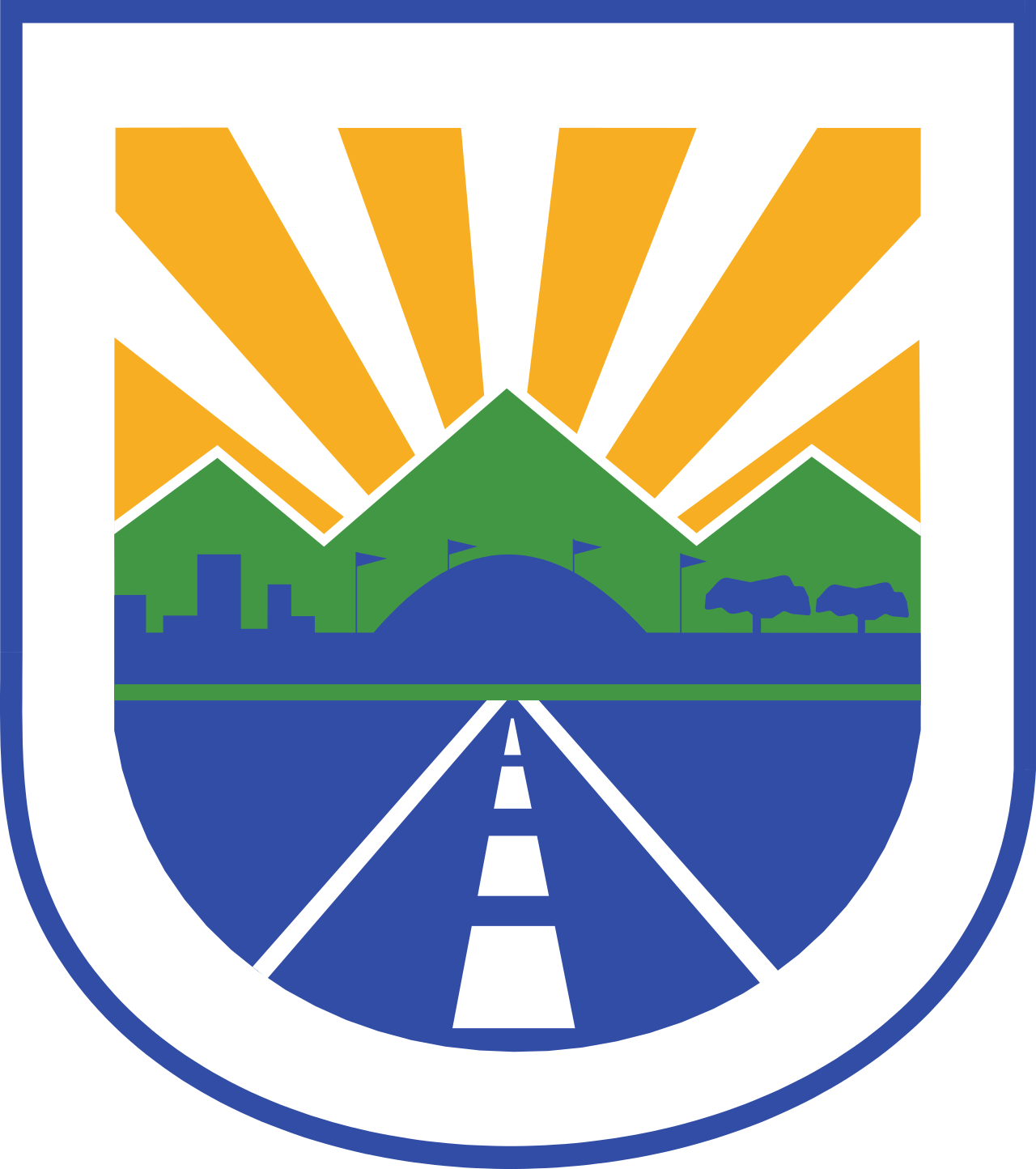
- Flag Coat of arms

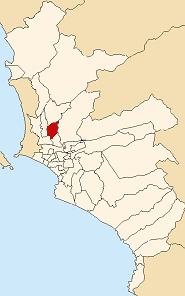
- Location of Independencia in the Lima Province
- Country: Peru
- Region: Lima
- Province: Lima
- Founded: March 16, 1964
- Capital: Independencia
- Subdivisions: 1 populated center

Government
  - Mayor: Alfred Reynaga (2023-2026)

Area
  - Total: 14.56 km^{2} (5.62 sq mi)
- 12.16 km^{2} (without disputed area))
- Elevation: 130 m (430 ft)

Population (2023)
  - Total: 232,726
  - Density: 15,980/km^{2} (41,400/sq mi)
- Time zone: UTC-5 (PET)
- UBIGEO: 150112
- Website: muniindependencia.gob.pe

Independencia is a district of the Lima Province in Peru. It is located in the north area of the city.

== History ==
In the Viceroyalty and early years of the republic, it was part of the great territory of Carabayllo.

Until the decade of the 1950s, the strong migration produced from the interior of the country brought waves of families to the capital looking for a better future in the capital.

In the mid of this context, and given the need of these migrant families to acquire their own land, in 1959 the Associations of Parents of Pro-housing Families "Tahuantinsuyo" and "Pampa de Cueva" were founded.

On the morning of November 17, 1960, some families, entered the deserts along kilometers 5 and 6 of Túpac Amaru Avenue, the old road to Canta, in a very organized manner.

Faced with the repression, the families withdrew until they reached kilometer four, next to the railway, where they resisted for 37 days in the face of inclement weather, lack of services, medicine and food. It was in this period that the death of some children on the railway tracks occurred. Tribute was paid to this sacrifice by naming one of the main streets of the district after Los Niños Martires.

In the following years, the area of Pampa de Repartición located at kilometer six and a half, in the district of Comas, was urbanized, establishing the Tahuantinsuyo Urbanization; then the land of Pampa El Ermitaño in Rímac District was occupied, located at kilometer four, other extensions of land would later be populated, integrating the human settlements of the peripheries.

After the complaints of the neighbors, the Congress decided to create a new district.

Officially created district on March 16, 1964. For Law 14965. The new district is segregated from Comas and Rímac Districts. Subsequently, through Law 16012 of January 31, 1966, its limits were deepened.

«The Independencia district is formed by the following popular urbanizations; that they acquire the category of towns; Independencia, El Ermitaño, Tahuantinsuyo, El Ángel, El Milagro and El Volante»

— Congress of the Republic of Peru, Law 14965

"To the north, south and west, the old Pan-American North highway and to the east, with the top of the hills called: El Morado, Loma del Castillo, Loma del San Albino, Cerro Quebrado and Cerro Negro"

— Congress of the Republic of Peru, Law 16012

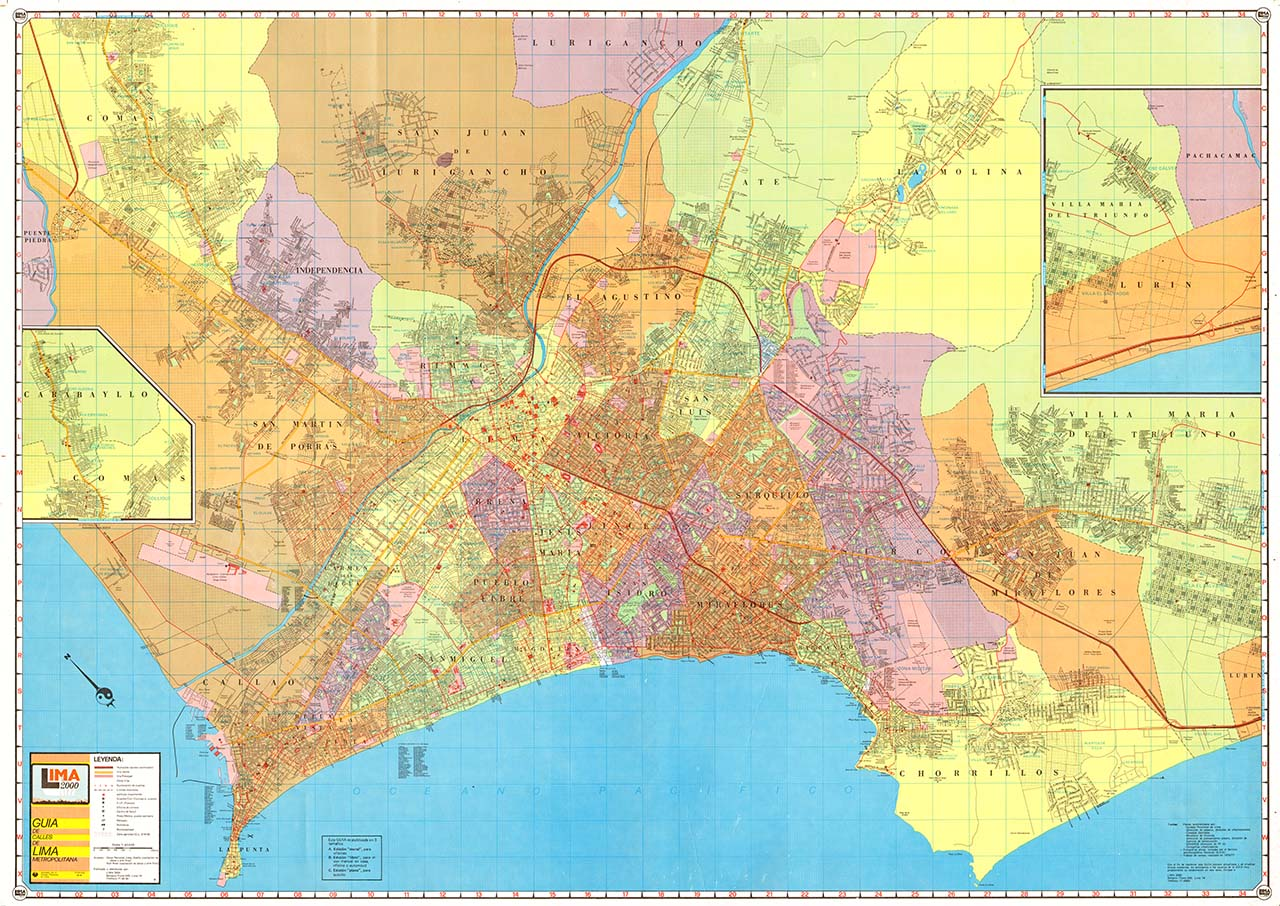
Independence district on the map of Metropolitan Lima in 1977

== Territorial dispute ==
In 1989 due to the territorial reduction of the district of San Martín de Porres by the creation of the district of Los Olivos, the old industrial area of 2.40 square kilometers, which is delimited by Avenue Panamericana Norte, Avenue Naranjal, Avenue Tupac Amaru and Avenue Tomas Valle, and made up of the Mesa Redonda, El Naranjal, Industrial Panamericana Norte, Industrial El Naranjal and Industrial Mulería urbanizations, became a disputed territory between Independencia and San Martin de Porres.

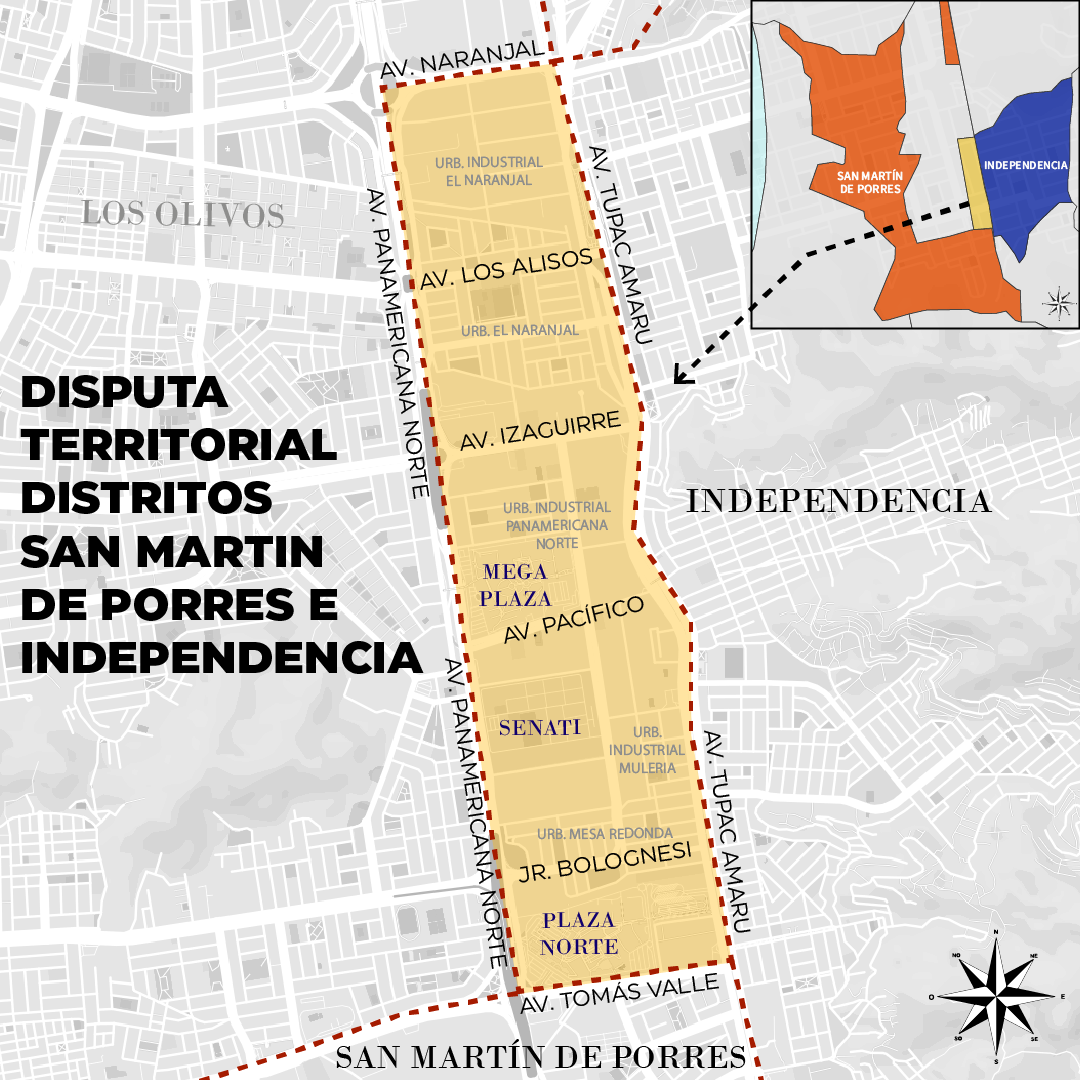
Disputed area of the San Martin de Porres district and the Independencia district

The position of the district of Independencia is that when the district of Los Olivos is created, part of the old industrial zone should be annexed. On the other hand, San Martin de Porres argues that the law creating Los Olivos does not detail the cession of territory to other districts not involved in addition to not having been an express request of the residents. It also highlights that the law creating Independencia (Law No. 14965, Law No. 16012 ) marks its limit on the Old Panamericana Norte (today Avenida Túpac Amaru).

The conflict also affects the municipal tax system, since large shopping centers are taxed in Independencia, but urbanizations and small and medium-sized businesses are taxed in San Martín de Porres. In 1998, residents of the Naranjal urbanization identified with San Martín de Porres confronted the Mayor of Independencia, Guillermo Chacaltana, and his aldermen in a brawl on Los Alisos avenue. In 2013, a fight occurred between citizens of the area and security guards over border problems. In 2015, residents of San Martín de Porres blocked the Panamericana Norte highway for about 45 minutes to demand that their area not be assigned to the district of Independencia through a bill. In 2017, residents of the area, identified with San Martín de Porres, refused to participate in the 2017 National Census because the National Institute of Statistics and Informatics considered said area as territory of Independence.

In February 2020, a confrontation occurred between the serenazgo de Independencia and the residents of Mesa Redonda due to interventions on motorcycle taxis that served in San Martín de Porres. In December of the same year, a confrontation between neighbors and serenading of both municipalities in the Mercado Naranjal, with the intervention of the police and the prosecutor's office. The Naranjal Municipal Agency is located in the area in the El Naranjal urbanization administered by the municipality of San Martín de Porres.

Currently there is no definitive solution by the Metropolitan Planning Institute, Metropolitan Municipality of Lima, or the Congress of the Republic.

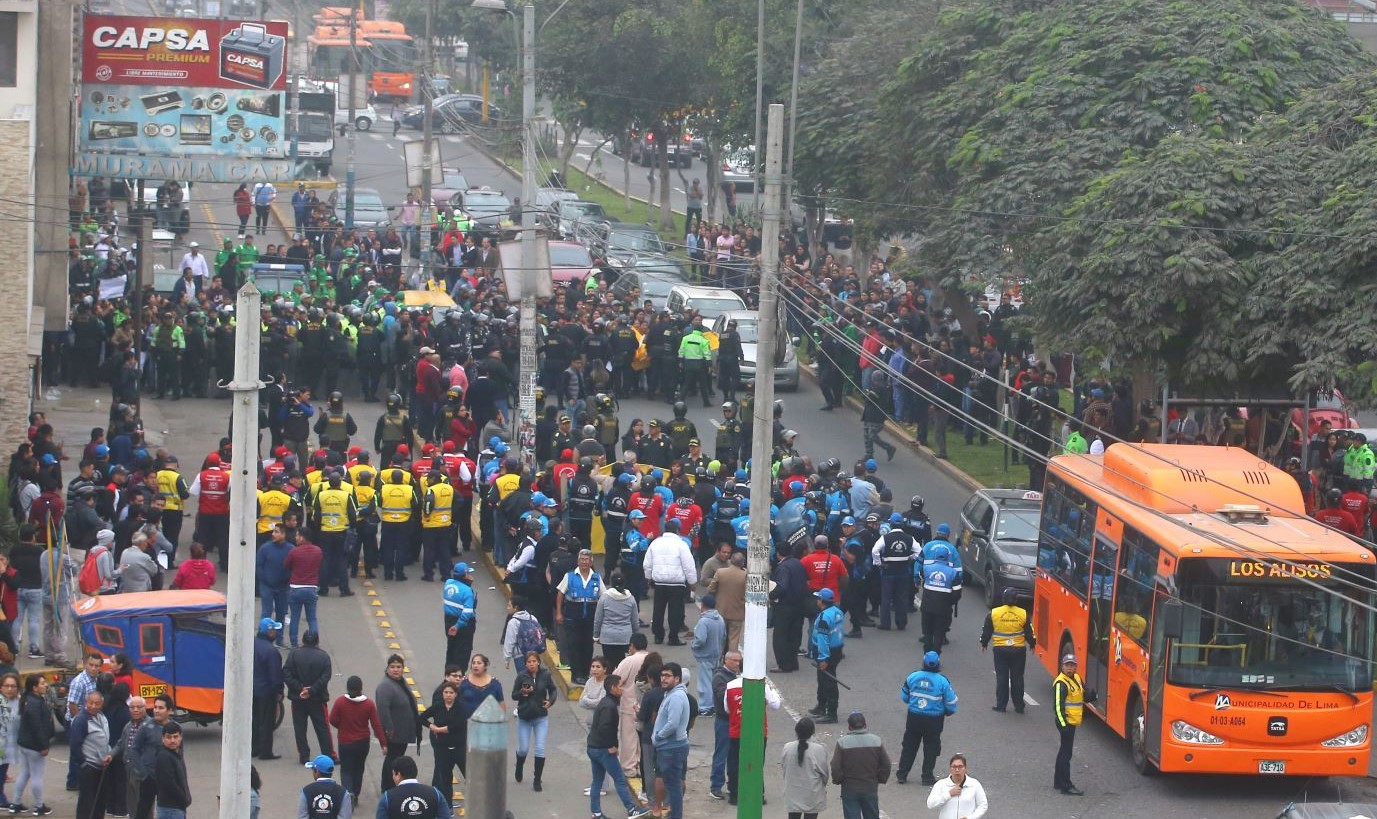
Conflict between night watchmen of San Martín de Porres and Independencia

== Economy ==
The district of Independencia is generally enabled by popular families of medium, medium-low and low socioeconomic status.

There are shopping centers and institutions that are located in the area in disput with San Martín de Porres district, including Plaza Norte (North Plaza Mall), the largest shopping center in the country.

== Transport ==
- Metropolitano (El Milagro, Tomás Valle, Los Jazmines, Independencia, Pacífico, Izaguirre and Naranjal Station)
- 101 Bus (Corredor Amarillo)

== Geography ==
The district has a total land area of 14.56 km^{2} (considering the zone in conclict, area of total control is 12.16 km²) Its administrative center is located 130 meters above sea level.

=== Boundaries ===
- North: Comas
- East: San Juan de Lurigancho
- South: Rímac and San Martín de Porres
- West: Los Olivos

== Demographics ==
According to a 2002 estimate by the INEI, Independencia has 206,843 inhabitants and a population density of 14,206.3 persons/km^{2}. In 1999, there were 36,999 households in the district.

== Authorities ==
=== Mayors ===
- 1967–1969: Victoriano García Delgadillo
- 1970: Arturo Novoa Torres
- 1971: Claudio Pinedo Acuña
- 1971: Amadeo Gonzáles Rumiche
- 1971–1975: Claudio Pinedo Acuña
- 1975: Emiliano Moriano Luján
- 1976–1979: Luis Alvarado Díaz
- 1979: Fidencio Cueva Roca
- 1980: Francisco Ruiz Mencía
- 1980: César Rodríguez Galindo
- 1981–1983: Leoncio Vigo Loja
- 1984–1989: Esther Moreno Huerta
- 1990–1992: Jesús Manuel Cáceres Fanaola
- 1993–1995: Jennifer de Jesús Olivera Olivera
- 1996–1997: Roberto Vidal Vidal
- 1997–1998: Néstor Pajuelo Chavarría
- 1998–2002: Guillermo Chacaltana Yerén
- 2003–2006: Víctor Yuri Vilela Seminario
- 2007–2010: Lovell Yomond Vargas
- 2011–2018: Evans Rodolfo Sifuentes Ocaña
- 2019–2022: Yuri Pando
- 2023–2026: Alfredo Reynaga Ramirez

== See also ==
- Administrative divisions of Peru
- Cono Norte
