= Túpac Amaru Avenue =

Avenue in Lima, Peru

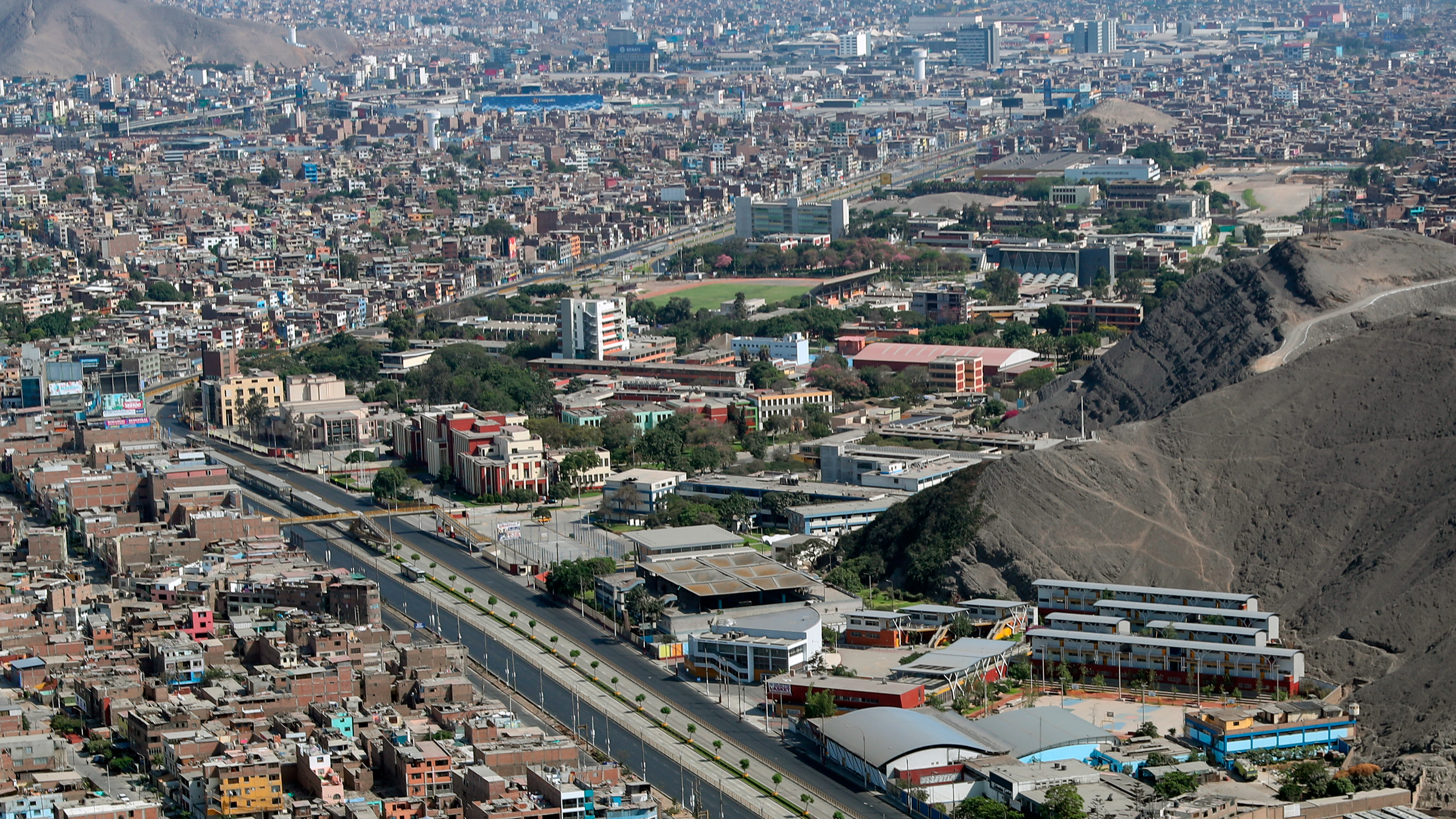
- Aerial view in 2020
- Part of: Former Pan-American Highway
- Namesake: Túpac Amaru
- From: Vencedores de Sángrar Highway
- To: Caquetá Avenue

Túpac Amaru Avenue (Spanish: Avenida Túpac Amaru), also known as the Highway to Ancón (Spanish: Autopista a Ancón) and as the Former Northern Pan-American Highway (Spanish: Antigua Carretera Panamericana Norte) until 1974, is a major avenue in Lima, Peru. It starts at Caquetá Avenue in Rímac District, travelling northbound for over 40 blocks while crossing San Martín de Porres, Los Olivos, Independencia and Comas districts, until it reaches Trapiche, becoming the Vencedores de Sángrar Highway in Carabayllo District, which connects Lima with Canta.

== History ==
The avenue is located on a former pre-Hispanic road, and contains part of COSAC I path of the Metropolitano bus system between Caquetá and Los Alisos avenues.

On January 18, 1966, a factory of the Ford Motor Company was inaugurated by then president Fernando Belaunde and businessman Henry Ford II.

== See also ==
- Highway 1 (Peru)
