= San Martín de Porres District =

District in Lima, Peru

Coordinates: 11°59′38″S 77°05′45″W

San Martín de Porres
- District
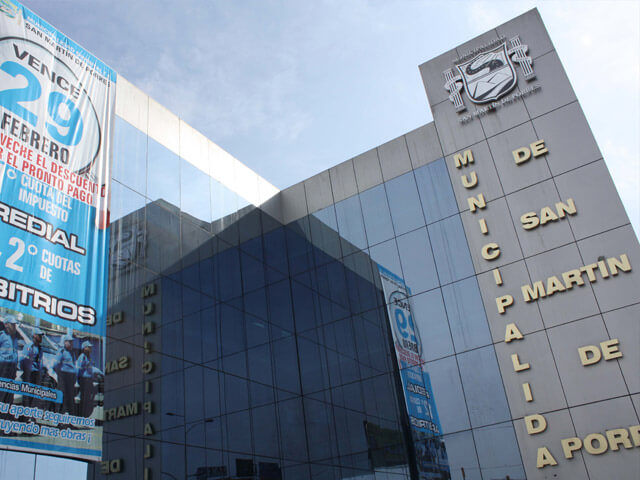

- Flag

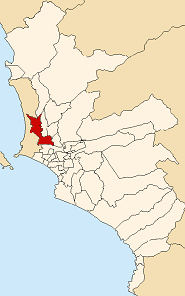
- Location of San Martín de Porres in Lima
- Country: Peru
- Region: Lima
- Province: Lima
- Created: May 22, 1950
- Capital: Barrio Obrero del Puente del Ejército

Government
  - Mayor: Hernán Sifuentes (2023–2026)

Area
  - Total: 41.5 km^{2} (16.0 sq mi)
- Elevation: 123 m (404 ft)

Population (2023)
  - Total: 782,075
  - Density: 18,800/km^{2} (48,800/sq mi)
- Time zone: UTC-5 (PET)
- UBIGEO: 150135
- Website: mdsmp.gob.pe

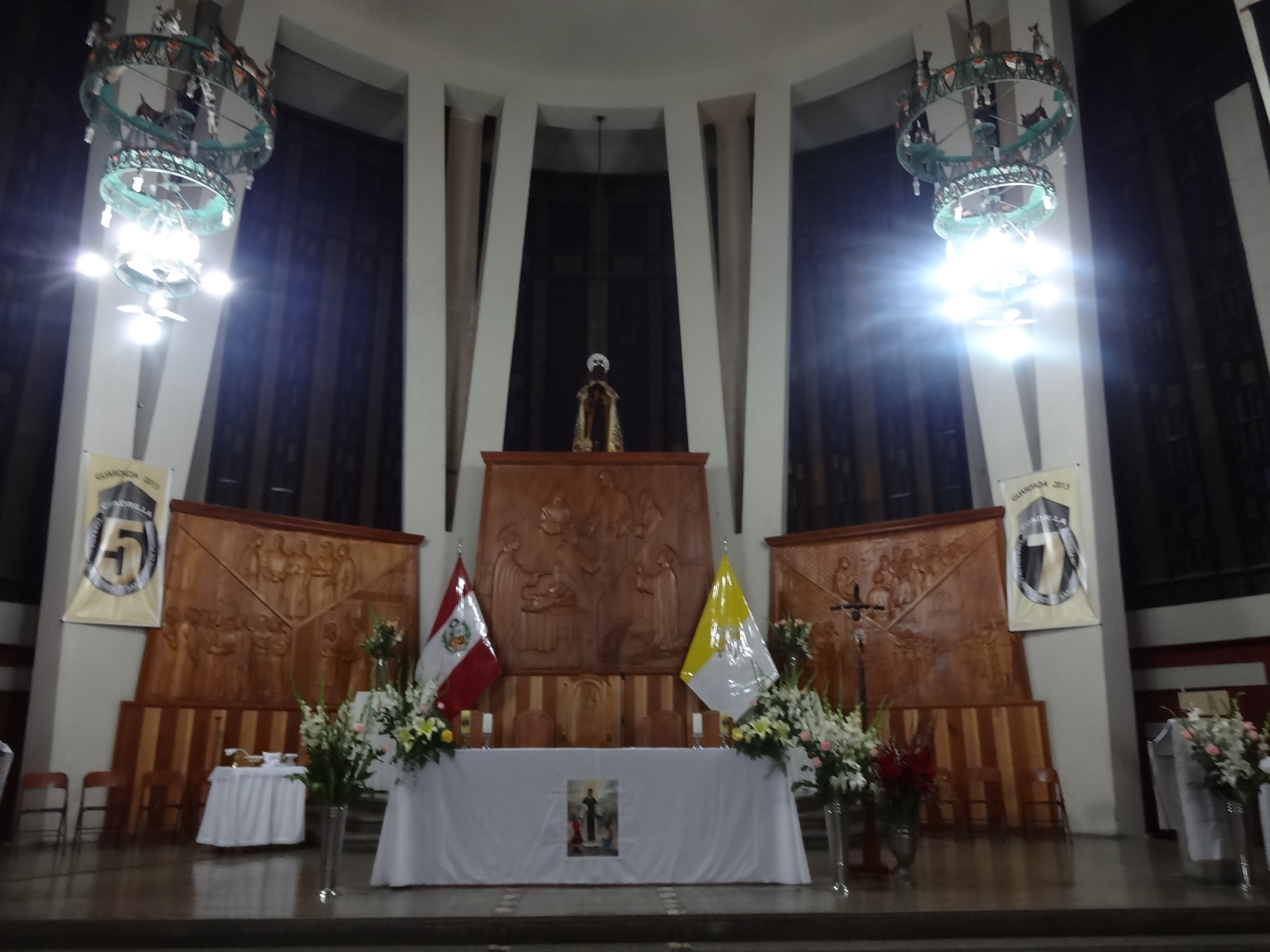
Main altar of National Sanctuary Saint Martin of Porras

San Martín de Porres (SMP) is a district in Lima, Peru, located in the north area of the city. It is bordered by the Chillón River, marks its natural border with Ventanilla and Puente Piedra on the north; Callao on the west; Los Olivos, Comas on the northeast; Rímac and Independencia districts on the east; the Rímac River marks its natural border with Lima District and Carmen de la Legua Reynoso on the south. It is the second most populated district of Lima metropolitan area and Peru.

== History ==
Since 1945, continuous invasions of territory in what was then part of the Carabayllo District, ended up in the creation of the Distrito Obrero Industrial 27 de Octubre on May 22, 1950, which is still celebrated as the district's anniversary.

The district was composed of the following haciendas: Chuquitanta, Pro, Naranjal, Infantas, Santa Rosa, Garagay Alto, G. Bajo, Chavarría, Mulería, Aliaga, Condevilla, San José, Palao, Huerta Sol, Oquendo, San Agustín and Marquez. The last three became part of Callao Province, in 1956.

In 1962, after the canonization of St. Martin de Porras, the name of the district was changed to its current name. Although historians have shown that the saint's actual last name was Porras, the district has retained the original spelling.

The district of Los Olivos was created in 1989, stripping some of San Martín de Porres' northeastern territory.

== Borderline conflicts ==
In 1956, due to the territorial cut due to the expansion of the Constitutional Province of Callao, an area of conflict arose with the Callao District. This dispute arose from the imprecision in the wording of the boundaries and the lack of cartography of the law, in addition to the disappearance of the original stone milestones due to the urbanization process. The conflict or indetermination of limits is still in force, as it corresponds to a district-provincial struggle, and is waiting to be fully defined by the Metropolitan Municipality of Lima, the Regional Government of Callao, the Provincial Municipality of Callao, the Municipality of San Martín de Porres, the Presidency of the Council of Ministers and the Congress of the Republic.

In 1989, due to the territorial reduction due to the creation of the Los Olivos district, two conflict zones arise, one with the Independencia District and the other with the Comas District. These districts argue that, when Los Olivos was created, part of the old industrial zone in San Martín de Porres would correspond to them to be annexed, however, according to San Martín de Porres, the law for the creation of a new district could not detail the transfer of territory to others not involved and because it was not an express request of the residents. It also highlights that the laws creating Comas (Law No. 13757) and Independencia (Law No. 14965, Law No. 16012) mark their limits on the Old Pan-American North (today Avenida Túpac Amaru).The conflict remains and both zones are not yet defined by the Metropolitan Planning Institute, the Metropolitan Municipality of Lima or the Congress of the Republic.

=== Conflict with Callao district ===
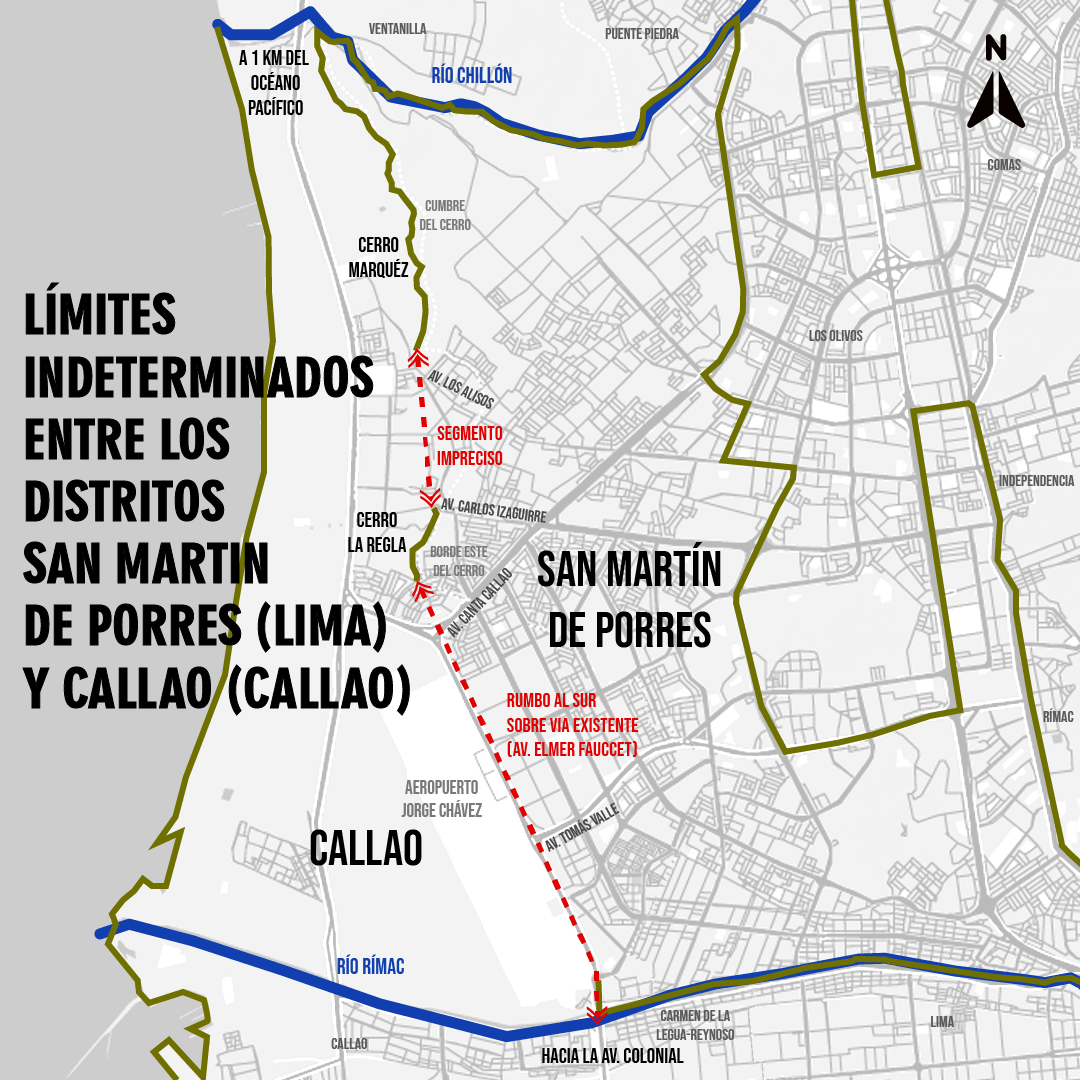
Disputed area of the San Martin de Porres District and the Callao District.

The area in territorial conflict with the district of Callao has a linear extension of approximately 11 kilometers and is located in two segments between the summit of Cerro Márquez to Cerro La Regla and from the eastern edge of Cerro La Regla to the Rímac River.

The first mentioned segment begins between passing through the summit of Cerro Márquez until entering Cerro La Regla. In this area, since 2000, settlements and urbanizations have been developed such as Floresta de Oquendo, Villas de Oquendo, Costa Azul, Palmeras de Oquendo, among others that are located between Alameda Central and Bertello avenues and archaeological sites such as the Inca Palace of Oquendo.

The second mentioned segment is from the eastern edge of Cerro La Regla moving south, crossing the Rímac River until reaching Colonial Avenue. In this area, since 1980, the El Álamo, Las Fresas, Sesquicentenario, Industrial Bocanegra, Santa Rosa, Bocanegra urbanizations have been developed, among others, which are located between Cuzco and Faucett avenues, close to the Jorge Chávez Airport.

=== Conflict with Independencia district ===
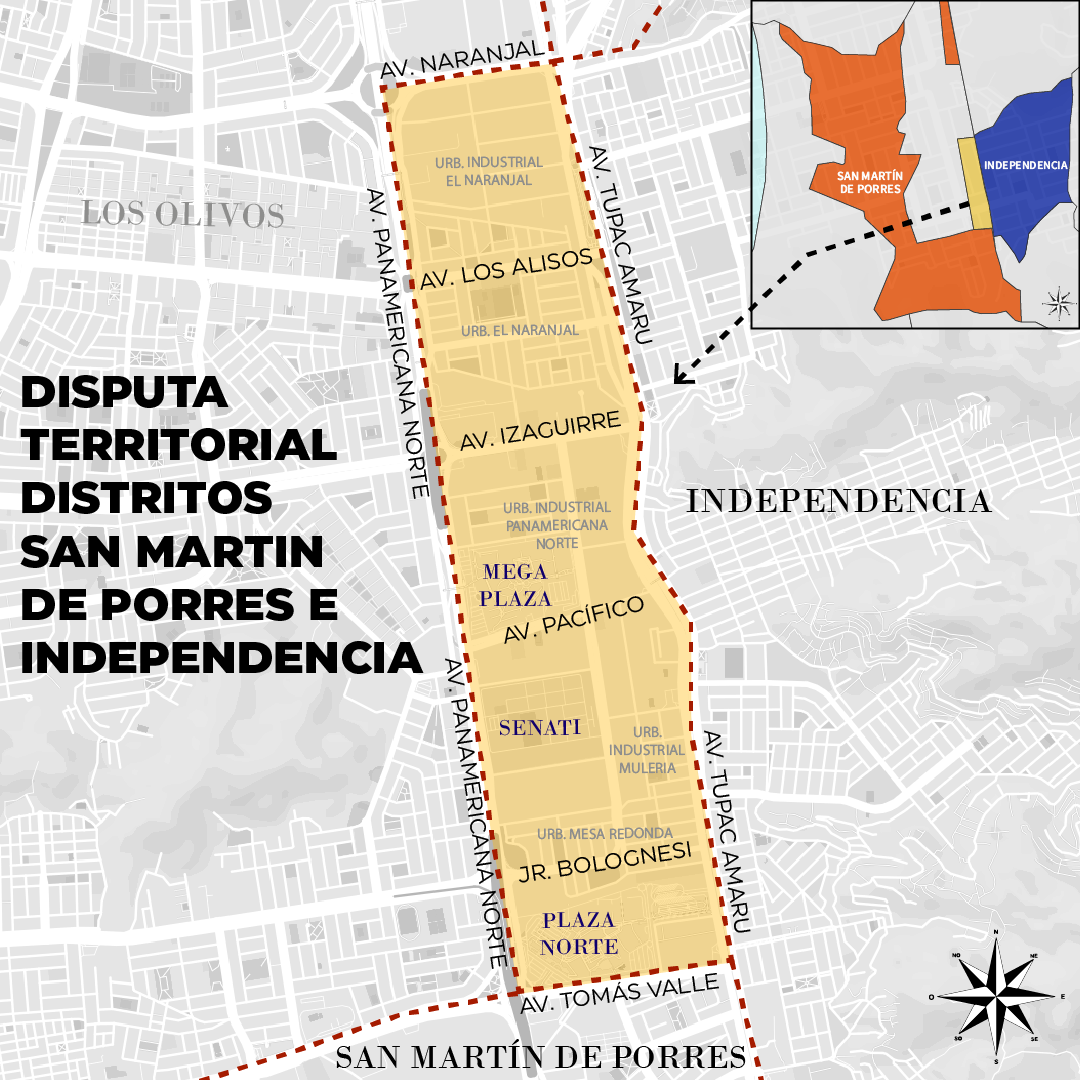
Disputed area of the San Martin de Porres District and the Independencia District.

The area in territorial conflict with the district of Independencia has a quadrangular shape of 2.40 square kilometers. It is delimited by Panamericana Norte, Naranjal, Tupac Amaru and Tomas Valle avenues, and contains the urbanizations Naranjal, Industrial, Mesa Redonda, Mulería, Industrial El Naranjal, Industria Panamericana Norte and the Residential Naranjal Housing Association.

The conflict also affects the municipal tax system since the large shopping centers pay taxes to Independencia, however the urbanizations and small and medium businesses pay taxes in San Martín de Porres.

=== Conflict with Comas district ===
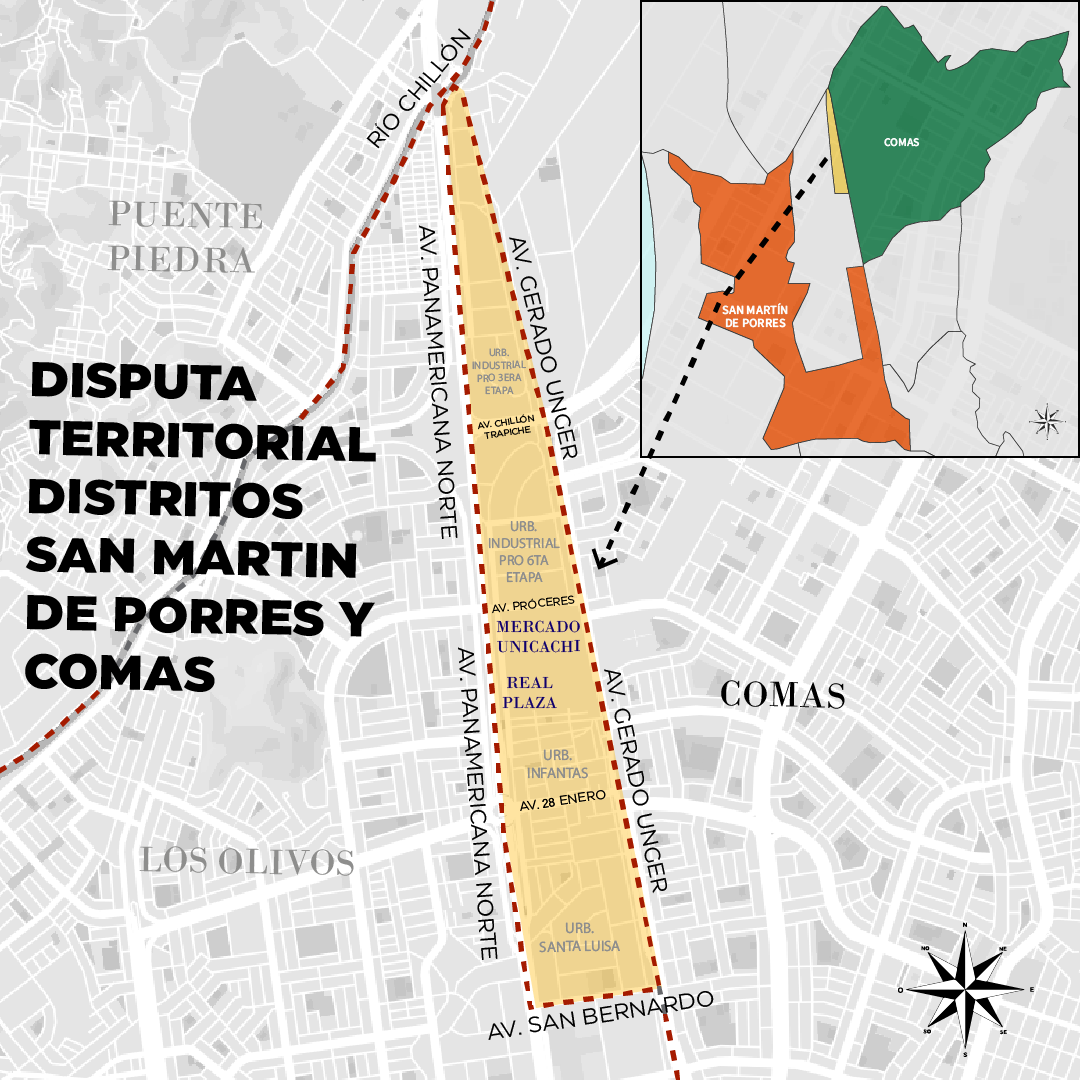
Disputed area of the San Martin de Porres District and the Comas District.

The area in territorial conflict with the district of Comas has a triangular shape of 1.28 square kilometers. It is delimited by San Bernardo, Panamericana Norte and Gerardo Unger avenues, up to the next bank of the Chillón River, and contains the urbanizations Santa Luisa, Santa Rosa de Infantas, Pro Industrial IV and IX Sector III Stage; the Municipal Human Settlement No. 02; and the housing associations José de San Martín, José Carlos Mariátegui and San Miguel.

The conflict also affects the municipal tax system since medium-sized and small businesses are taxed in both municipalities, however urbanizations are taxed in San Martín de Porres.

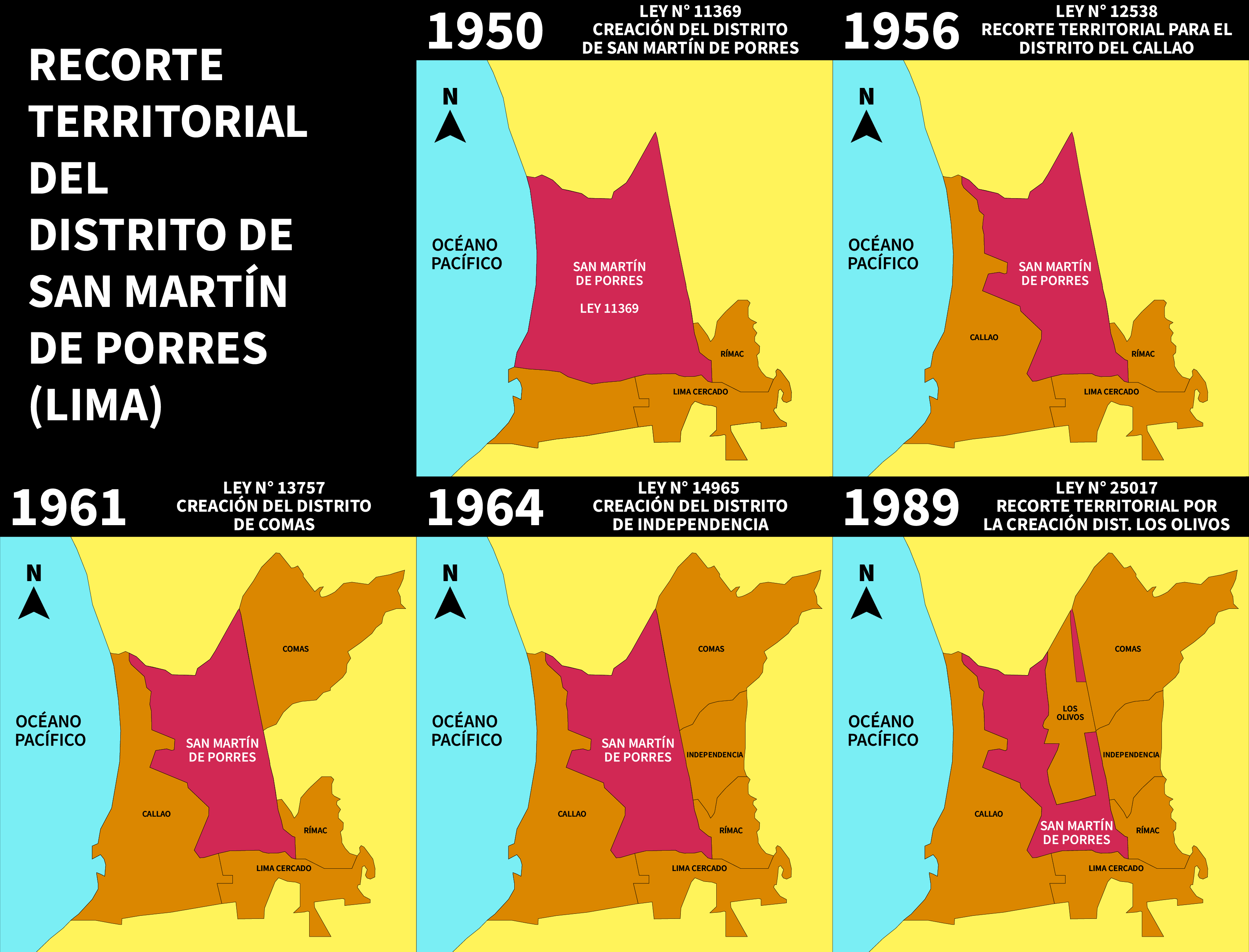
Territorial losses of the San Martín de Porres district.

== Geography and territorial division ==
The district of San Martín de Porres is located northwest of the center of Lima, between the right bank of the Rímac River and the left bank of the Chillón River. Its latitude with respect to the equator is 12 degrees, 1 minute and 40 seconds and its longitude is 77 degrees, 2 minutes and 36 seconds west of the Greenwich Meridian. This data corresponds to its capital, the Barrio Obrero del Puente del Ejercito.

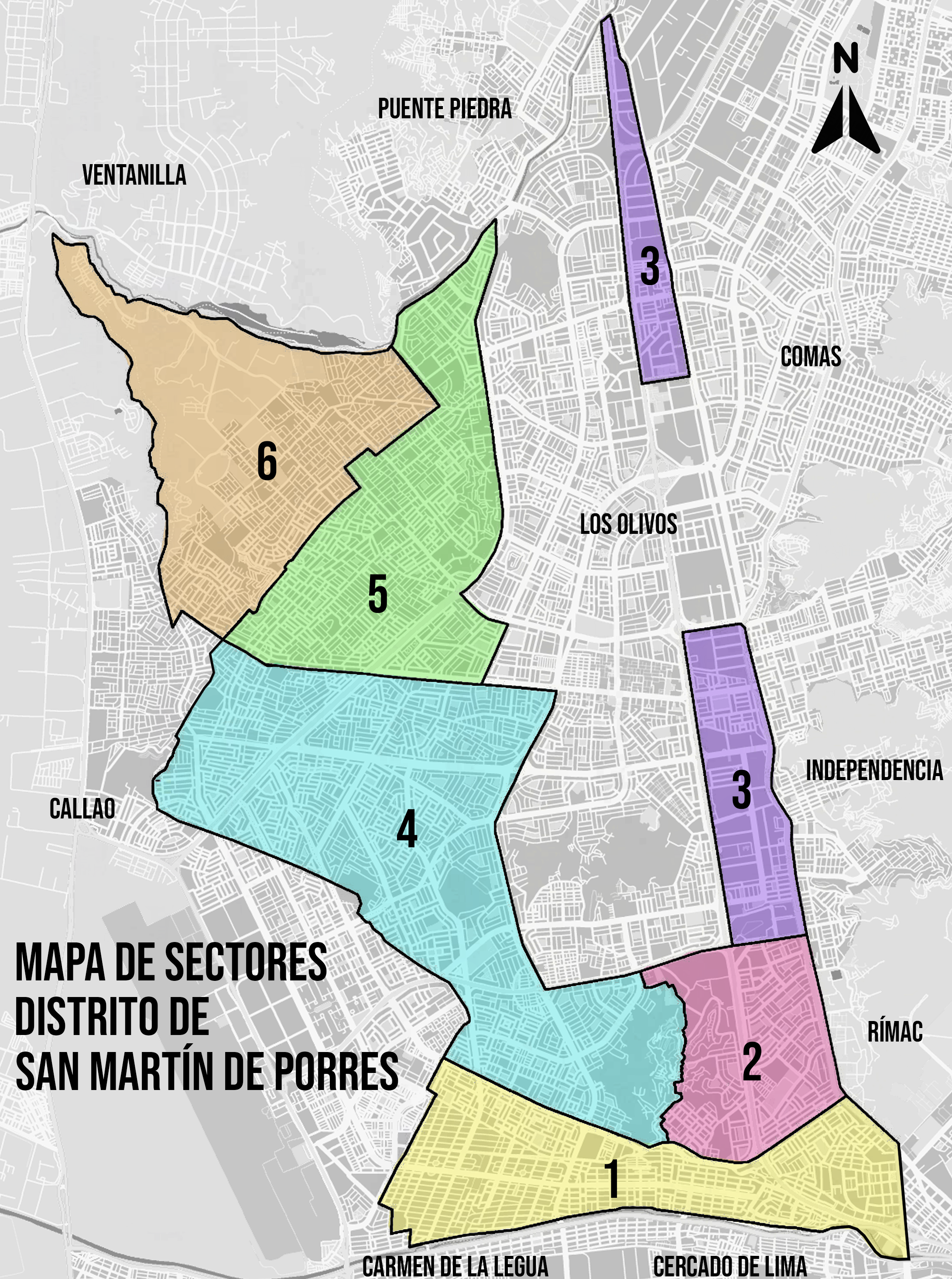
Sector plan of the San Martín de Porres district.

The district is located 123 meters above sea level. Its climate is temperate and humid. It has an area of 41.5 km². In 2023, its estimated population was 782,075, according to the National Institute of Statistics and Informatics. The district is administratively divided into six sectors.

== Authorities ==
=== Mayors ===
- 2023–2026: Hernán Tomás Sifuentes Barca (PP)
- 2019–2022: Julio Abraham Chávez Chiong (AP)
- 2015–2018: Adolfo Israel Mattos Piaggio (SU)
- 2011–2014: Freddy Santos Ternero Corrales † (PPC)
- 2007–2010: Freddy Santos Ternero Corrales † (SP)
- 2003–2006: Lucio Campos Huayta (UN)
- 1999–2002: Gladys Ugaz de Vera (SP)
- 1996–1998: Jaime Kanashiro Ywamoto (C90-NM)
- 1993–1995: José Arcenio Rubio Valqui (OBRAS)
- 1990–1992: Marcelino Morales Scandon (FREDEMO-AP)
- 1987–1989: José Isaac Miranda Valladares (IU)
- 1984–1986: José Isaac Miranda Valladares (IU)
- 1981–1983: Willy Fernández Melo (IU)
- 1967–1969: Enrique León Velarde Gamarra † (AP-DC)
- 1964–1966: Víctor Reyes Ramos (APRA-UNO)

== Urban landmarks ==
There are shopping centers and institutions according to the official map of the district.

- Plaza Norte (In dispute with Independencia)
- Real Plaza Pro
- Plaza Center San Martín de Porres
- MegaPlaza Independencia (In dispute with Independencia)
- Royal Plaza (In dispute with Independencia)
- Metro Independencia (In dispute with Independencia)
- Tottus (MegaPlaza Independencia venue in dispute)
- PlazaVea (Real Plaza premises in dispute and Av. Izaguirre disputed by Independencia)
- Sodimac (In dispute with Independencia)
- San Ignacio de Loyola University (In dispute with Independencia)
- Peruvian North American Cultural Institute (ICPNA) (In dispute with Independencia)
- Cayetano Heredia University
- Cayetano Heredia National Hospital
- National Institute of Mental Health "Honorio Delgado – Hideyo Noguchi"
- Fiori Comercial Center
- Mercado Unicachi Pro (In dispute with Comas)

== Avenues ==
- Carretera Panamericana Norte (PE-1N Pan American highway)
- Avenida Caquetá
- Avenida Zarumilla (PE-1N)
- Avenida Eduardo de Habich
- Avenida Túpac Amaru (PE-20A)
- Avenida Canta Callao (PE-20)
- Avenida Naranjal
- Avenida Tantamayo
- Avenida Paramonga
- Avenida Carlos Izaguirre
- Avenida Los Alisos
- Avenida Próceres
- Avenida José Granda
- Avenida Bocanegra
- Avenida Angélica Gamarra
- Avenida Tomás Valle
- Avenida Universitaria
- Avenida Germán Aguirre
- Avenida José Granda
- Avenida Lima
- Avenida Bertello (In dispute with Callao)
- Avenida Pacasmayo (In dispute with Callao)
- Avenida Dominicos (In dispute with Callao)
- Avenida Perú
- Avenida Los Próceres
- Avenida 12 de Octubre
- Avenida Salaverry
- Avenida Quilca
- Avenida Chillón Trapiche (In dispute with Comas)
- Avenida Próceres (In dispute with Comas)
- Avenida San Bernardo (In dispute with Comas)
- Avenida 25 de Enero (In dispute with Comas)
- Avenida Francisco Bolognesi (In dispute with Independencia)
- Avenida El Pacifico (In dispute with Independencia)
- Avenida Industrial (In dispute with Independencia)

== Neighborhoods ==
- Urb Barrio Obrero
- Urb Caquetá
- Urb Miguel Grau
- Urb Zarumilla
- Urb Ingenieria
- Urb Palao
- Urb Los Jardines
- Urb Fiori
- Urb Perú
- Urb Condevilla Señor
- Urb San Germán
- Urb Antares
- Urb Los Libertadores
- Urb El Pacífico
- Urb Garagay
- Urb Valdivieso
- Urb. El Naranjal (In dispute with Independencia)
- Urb. Mesa Redonda (In dispute with Independencia)
- Urb. Industrial Panamericana (In dispute with Independencia)
- Urb. Infantas (In dispute with Comas)
- Urb. Santa Luisa (In dispute with Comas)
- Urb Industrial Pro (In dispute with Comas)

== Pre-Hispanic Buildings (Huacas) ==
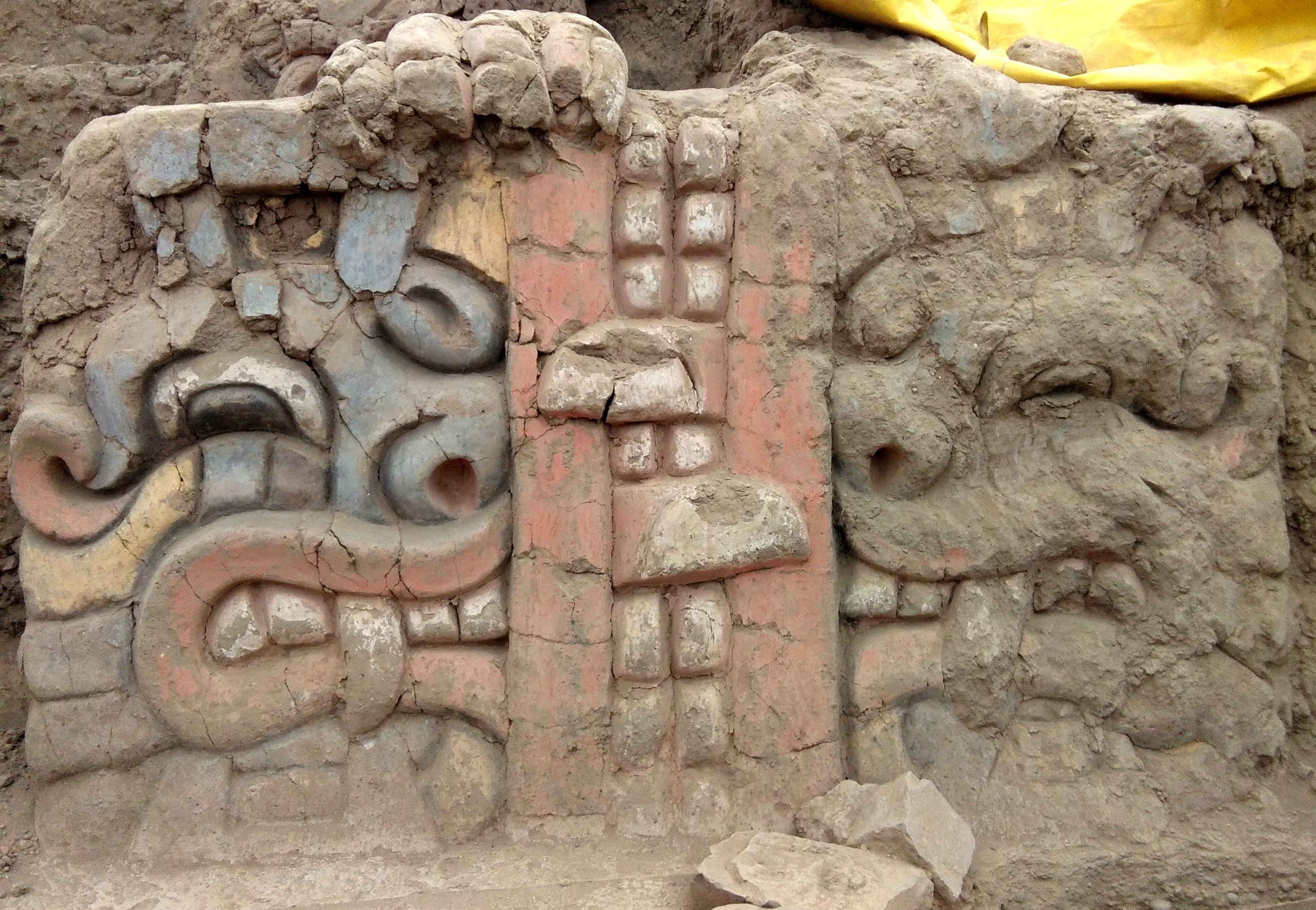
Pre-Hispanic wall of Huaca Garagay

- Huaca El Paraiso
- Huaca Garagay
- Huaca Palao
- Huaca Santa Rosa
- Huaca Fundo Naranjal
- Huaca Manzanillo 1
- Huaca Manzanillo 2
- Huaca Condevilla Señor 1
- Huaca Condevilla Señor 2
- Huaca Lechuza
- Huaca El Paraíso
- Huaca Cerro La Milla
- Huaca Chuquitanta

== See also ==
- Administrative divisions of Peru
- Largest cities in the Americas
- List of districts of Lima
- List of metropolitan areas of Peru
- List of people from Lima
- List of sites of interest in the Lima Metropolitan area
- Ancient Buildings in Coast of Peru
