= Nanay Bridge =

Nanay Bridge Puente Nanay
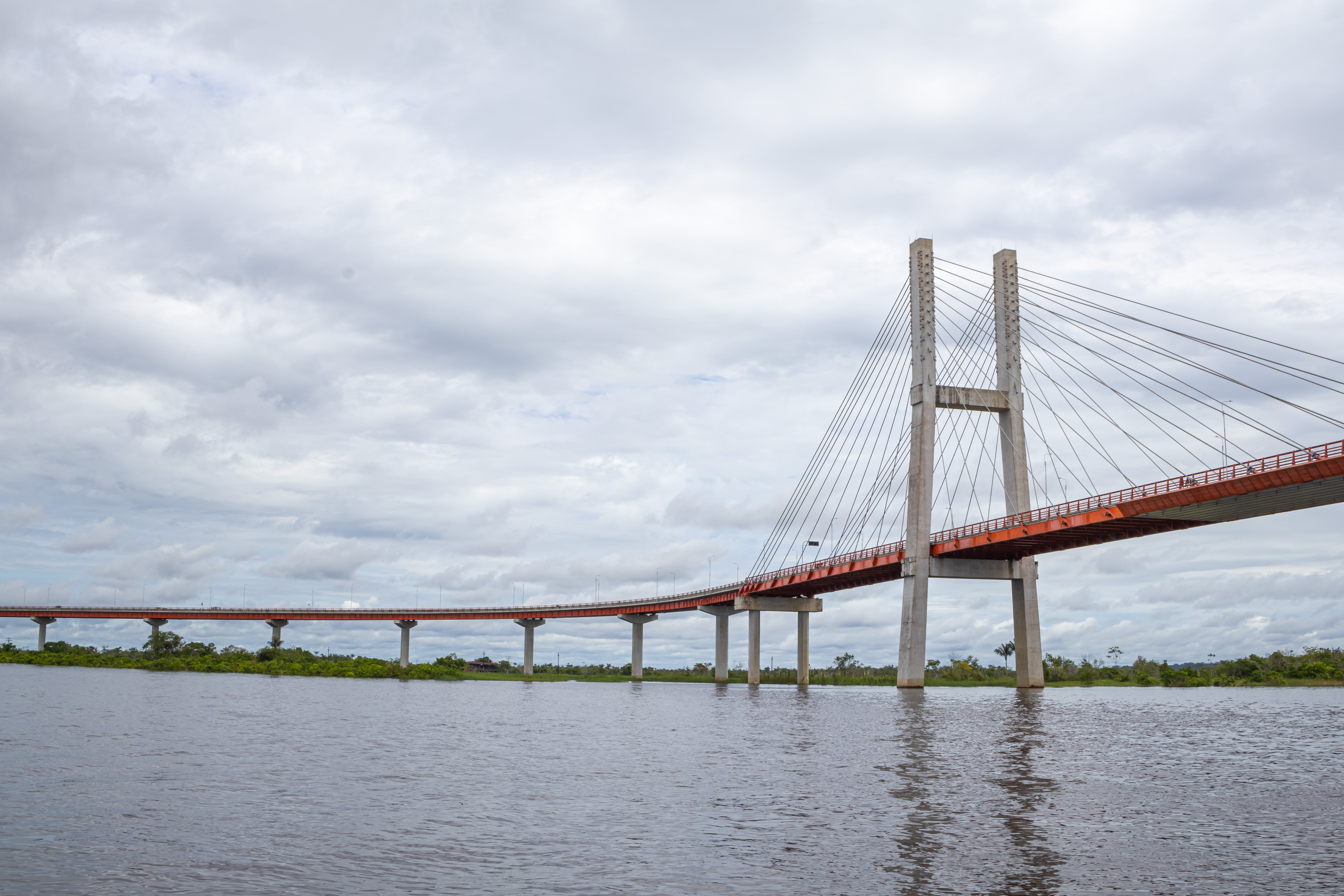
- Coordinates: 3°41′43.2″S 73°15′17.4″W
- Crosses: Nanay River
- Locale: Iquitos, Loreto Region, Peru

Characteristics
- Design: Cable-stayed bridge
- Material: Steel, concrete

Location
- Interactive map of Nanay Bridge

The Nanay Bridge (Spanish: Puente Nanay) is a bridge located in the center of the Department of Loreto, Peru, which connects Bellavista-Nanay, in the north of the city of Iquitos, with the south of the Santo Tomás del Nanay area.

The Nanay, with its 2283 meters in length, is the longest bridge in Peru (as of 2017), surpassing the President Guillermo Billinghurst Bridge, a 723 m long hanging cable bridge, located in Puerto Maldonado, of the Departament of Madre de Dios.

The bridge provides a direct connection between the RD LO-103 of the Iquitos metropolitan area with the RN PE-5N I, and all of this together forms part of the expansion of the RN PE-5N in Loreto.
