= Highway 2 (Peru) =

Highway in Peru

National Route 02
- Ruta nacional 02

Route information
- Maintained by Ministry of Transportation and Communications
- Length: 48 mi (77 km)

Major junctions
- From: Piura
- To: Paita

Location
- Country: Peru

Highway system
- Highways in Peru

Peru Highway 2 is a transversal highway in Peru that connects the cities of Piura and Paita. It is part of the "North Interoceanic Highway". The road is currently concessioned to Concesionaria IIRSA Norte S.A.
