= Carmen de la Legua Reynoso District =

District of Callao, Peru

Carmen de la Legua Reynoso
- District
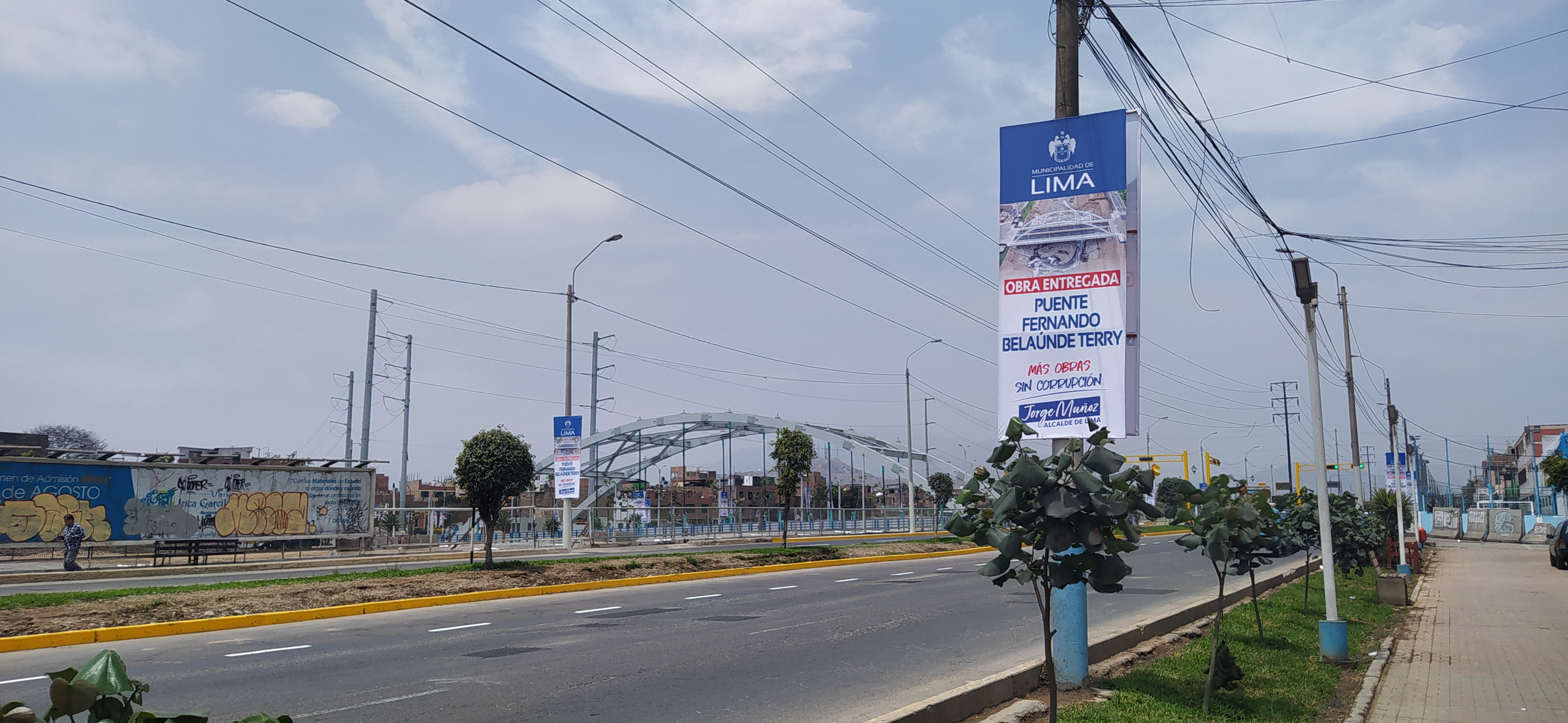
- View of Fernando Belaúnde Terry Bridge

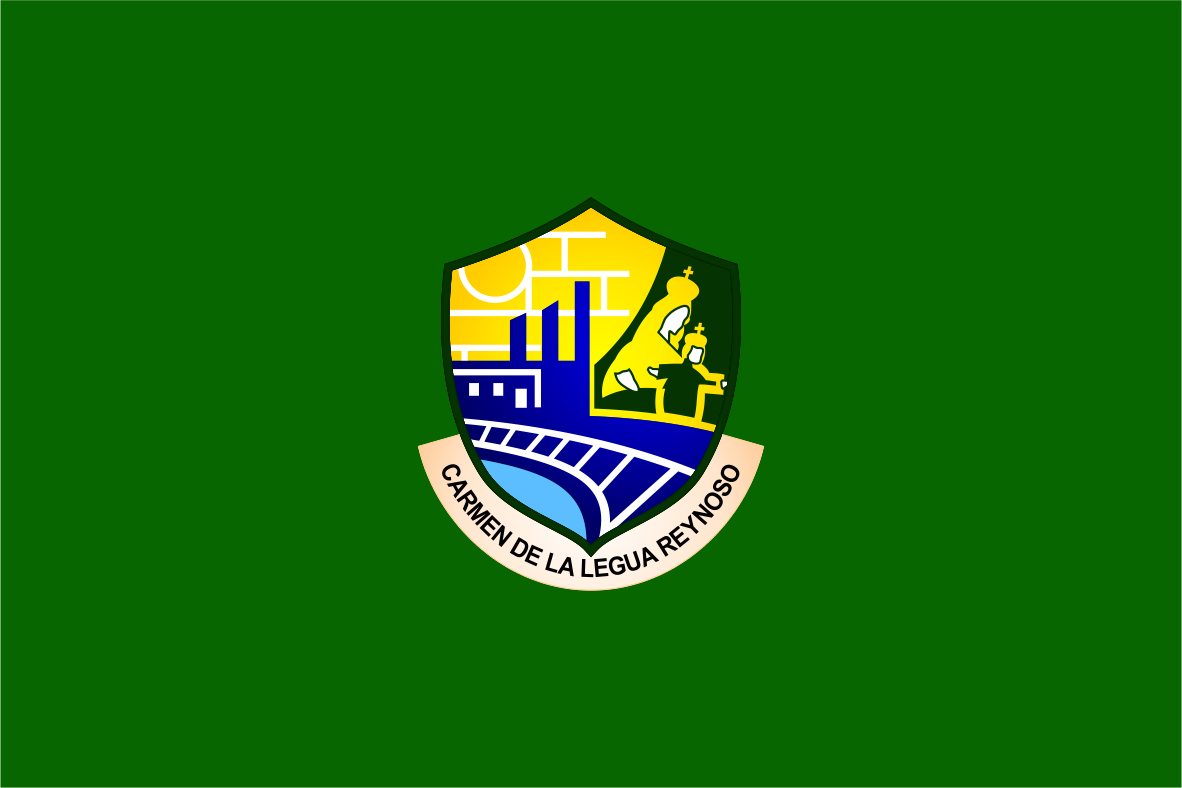
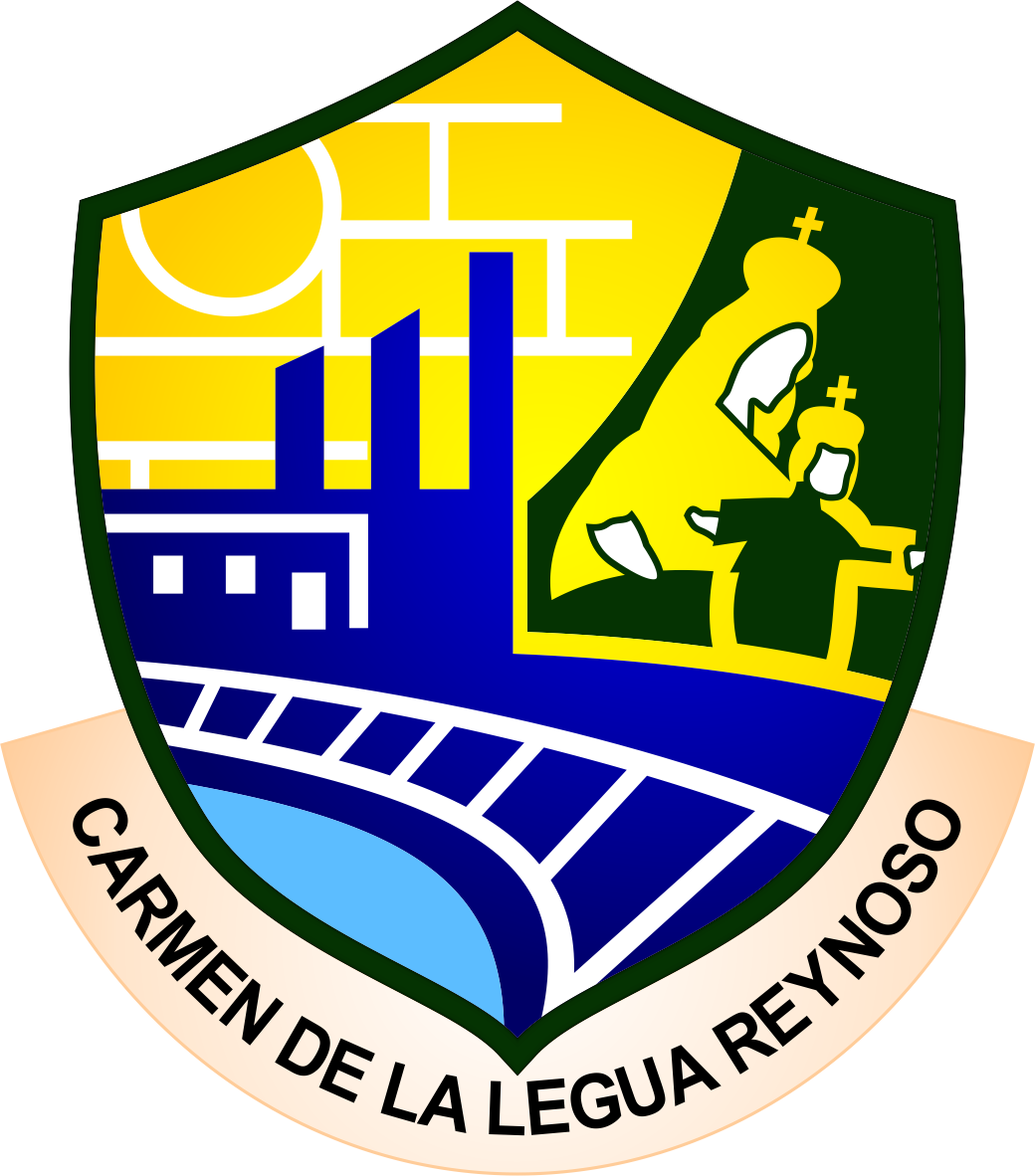
- Flag Coat of arms

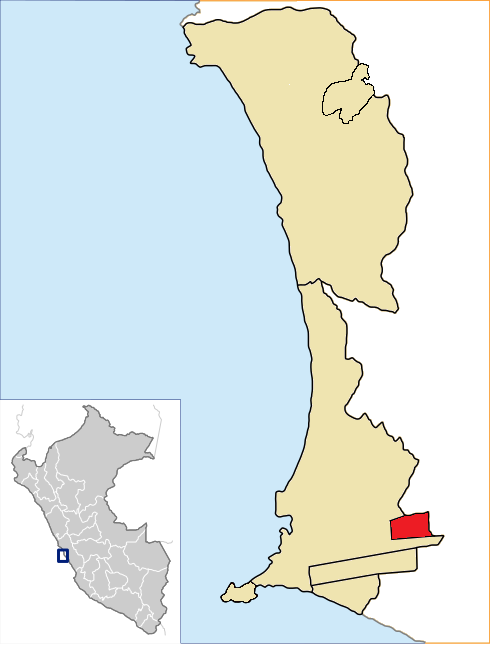
- Location of Carmen de la Legua Reynoso in Peru
- Coordinates: 12°2′22″S 77°5′43″W
- Country: Peru
- Province: Callao
- Capital: Carmen de la Legua Reynoso
- Subdivisions: December 4, 1964

Government
  - Mayor: Edwards Infante López

Area
  - Total: 2.12 km^{2} (0.82 sq mi)
- Elevation: 54 m (177 ft)

Population (2017)
  - Total: 42,240
  - Density: 19,900/km^{2} (51,600/sq mi)
- Time zone: UTC-5 (PET)
- UBIGEO: 070103
- Website: www.municarmendelalegua.gob.pe

Carmen de la Legua Reynoso is a district of Callao, Peru. Its creation dates back to a series of informal settlements built in the area by inner country migrants during the mid-20th century, ultimately being formally established as a district in late 1964.

== Etymology ==
The district is named in part after a sanctuary dedicated to Our Lady of Mount Carmel, located one league away from both Lima and Callao. Its other name, Reynoso, comes from a brickworks established by one of the area's first settlers.

== History ==
What would eventually become the district was once covered by shrubland surrounding the road connecting Lima and Callao, itself surrounded by farmland. The area later known as Reynoso was located next to Rímac River. Under the Spanish, a hermitage dedicated to John of God was built on site by the order of the same name, exactly one league away from both cities. In 1617, a school was established by the Carmelites, and a sanctuary dedicated to Our Lady of Mount Carmel was built on the site of the former hermitage.

Starting in the 20th century, the area became gradually populated by immigrants from the countryside, who established settlements in the empty farmland surrounding the city. It was officially established under the name in the 1950s by José López Pasos, Alejandro Ladrón De Guevara, and Medina Barios Ántero Lizano, the latter serving as the secretary in charge of zoning and distribution. By this time, the area was wholly dedicated to the sale of construction materials, and the concession for the extraction and sale of sand—to be used for cement—had been granted to the Confederación de Areneros del Perú. López and his associates established the Reynoso brickworks, also building homes to be able to work at night.

The first settlers moved to an area located to the west known as the "Callejón de Reynoso," which eventually became New Reynoso, establishing a homeowners' association headed by López. To the east, other settlers built a slum between Jorge Chávez street and Nicolás Dueñas avenue, known as "La Victoria" (initially "Nuevo Callao"), and whose homeowners' association was headed by Justo Alarcón Rubina. Other settlers included refugees from Tarapacá, who left due to the War of the Pacific and were awarded a lot in the area through a law passed by the government.

The informal settlement of the area led to a dispute with Alberto Cayetano Espantoso Bergmann, the owner of an adjacent estate known as Chacra Puente, during which services were slowly constructed in the area: in 1956, the houses were made of bricks, two wells, six generators, a communal building, two churches, five schools, and one medical outpost. In 1964, Juan Razzeto, a deputy representing Callao, presented a project in the Chamber of Deputies at the request of the area's locals. It was approved, and the district was officially established on December 4, through Law No. 15247. In 1966, Marino Peláez Villarreal was chosen as the district's first mayor.

A statue dedicated to Our Lady of Mount Carmel was inaugurated in January 2001, being relocated due to the roadworks that aimed to connect Jorge Chávez International Airport with the rest of the city.

== Politics ==
Carmen de la Legua Reynoso is under the jurisdiction of its own district municipality, headed by a mayor.

=== List of mayors ===
Since 2023, the incumbent mayor is Edwards Infante López.

| № | Mayor | Party | Term | |
| № | Mayor | Party | Begin | End |
|---|---|---|---|---|
| 1 | Marino Pelaez Villareal | —N/a | 1967 | 1969 |
| 2 | Porfirio Espinoza Roca | —N/a | 1969 | |
| 3 | Alejandro Fajardo Luna | —N/a | 1970 | 1972 |
| 4 | Manuel Almonte Montoya | —N/a | 1972 | 1973 |
| 5 | Pedro Varacadillo Figueroa | —N/a | 1973 | 1974 |
| 6 | Alcides Malca Solano | —N/a | 1974 | 1977 |
| 7 | Percy Rojas Andrade | —N/a | 1977 | 1979 |
| 8 | José Castro Alfaro | —N/a | 1979 | 1979 |
| 9 | Hugo Matos Estrada | —N/a | 1980 | 1980 |
| 10 | Francisco Barreda Flores | Izquierda Unida | 1984 | 1986 |
| 10 | Francisco Barreda Flores | Izquierda Unida | 1987 | 1989 |
| 11 | Augusto Aspilcueta Alarcón | —N/a | 1987 | 1989 |
| 12 | Manuel Méndez García | Frente Independiente Distrital | 1990 | 1992 |
| 13 | Olga Moreano Vargas | Acción Popular | 1993 | 1995 |
| 14 | Juan de Dios Gavilano Ramírez | Cambio 90 — Nueva Mayoría | 1996 | 1998 |
| 15 | Félix Moreno Caballero | Chim Pum Callao | 1999 | 2002 |
| 15 | Félix Moreno Caballero | Chim Pum Callao | 2003 | 2006 |
| 16 | Juan de Dios Gavilano Ramírez | Chim Pum Callao | 2007 | 2010 |
| 17 | Daniel Almanzor Lecca Rubio | ADUANEC | 2011 | 2014 |
| 18 | Raúl Odar Cabrejos | Chim Pum Callao | 2015 | 2018 |
| 19 | Carlos Alfredo Cox Palomino | Por ti Callao | 2019 | 2022 |
| 20 | Edwards Infante López | Contigo Callao | 2023 | Incumbent |

== Subdivisions ==
Carmen de la Legua Reynoso is the site of a lone populated centre that is coterminous with the district:

| Code | Name | Region Type | Altitude (MSL) | Population (total) | Housing (total) |
|---|---|---|---|---|---|
| 0001 | Carmen de la Legua Reynoso | Chala | 82 | 42,240 (2017) | 11,222 (2017) |

== Geography ==
The district has a total land area of 2.12 km^{2}. Its administrative center is located 54 meters above sea level.

=== Boundaries ===
- North: Callao District, San Martín de Porres District (in the Lima Province)
- East: Lima District
- South and West: Downtown Callao

== Demographics ==
According to the 2005 census by the INEI, the district has 40,439 inhabitants, a population density of 19,075 persons/km^{2} and 8,745 households in the district.

== See also ==
- Administrative divisions of Peru
