= Puente del Ejército =

Bridge in Lima, Peru

Army Bridge Puente del Ejército
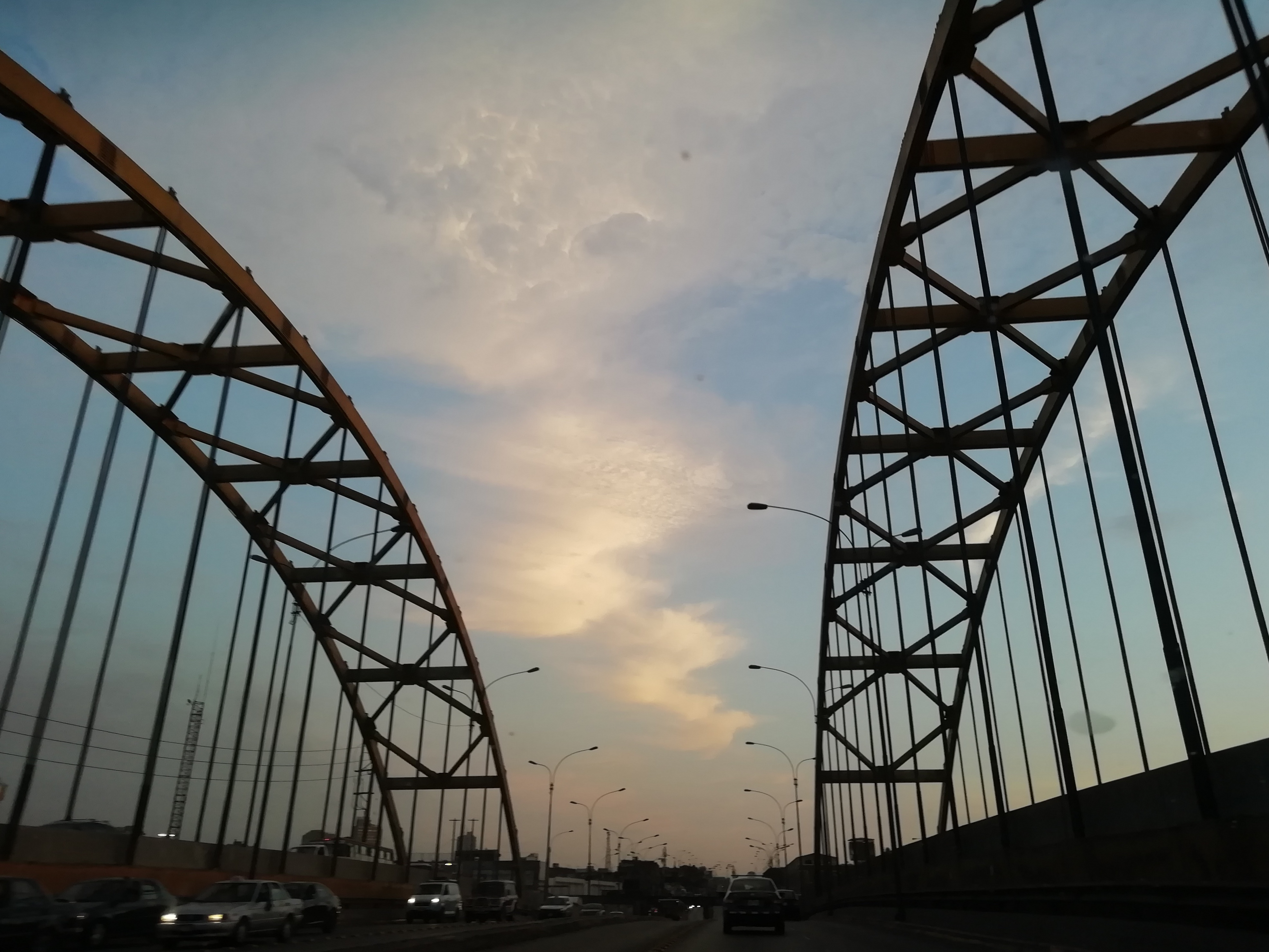
- The bridge in 2019
- Coordinates: 12°02′20″S 77°02′36″W
- Crosses: Rímac river
- Begins: Alfonso Ugarte Avenue
- Ends: Caquetá Avenue
- Named for: Peruvian Army

History
- Inaugurated: December 31, 1936

The Army Bridge (Spanish: Puente del Ejército) is a tied-arch bridge that crosses Rímac River in the limits of Rímac and San Martín de Porres districts of Lima, Peru. It joins Alfonso Ugarte Avenue to the south with Caquetá Avenue (former Pan-American Highway) to the north. It was inaugurated on December 31, 1936, under then president Óscar R. Benavides, and was later remodelled in the 1950s, under the presidency of Manuel A. Odría.

Located next to the bridge is a velodrome, reopened in 2016.

== History ==
Within the framework of the 400th anniversary of the founding of Lima, it was proposed to build a new bridge, the fourth in the city after the Stone Bridge, the Balta Bridge and the Stick Bridge. It was desired to connect the Cercado de Lima with the then border area between then Carabayllo and Rímac, through then Bolognesi Avenue and the old Pan-American Highway. The original design had a steel structure 60 m long and 13 m wide, manufactured at the Gute Hoffnunghuste plant; the work was awarded to the German firm Ferrostaal-Essen. Its construction was carried out between the Ministry of Public Works, which managed the steel structure, and the Junta Pro Desocupados, which was in charge of the earthworks to reduce the riverbed from 500 to 60 metres. This project occurred during the mayoralty of Luis Gallo Porras.

In 1964, the bridge was redesigned during the first mandate of Fernando Belaunde Terry, the given design removed the arches from the sides, as well as the road was expanded to two lanes. In 2010, the expansion of the bridge structure began, under the mandate of Mayor Luis Castañeda. Two independent parallel bridges were designed, downstream and upstream of the old Army Bridge, and with a design somewhat similar to the original (with arches). The length of the bridges corresponds to 105.05 m and its width is 9.10 m. The structure was a metal cable-stayed arch and a 200 mm thick concrete deck. The running surface of the bridges is a 0.05 m thick hot asphalt layer and accesses with flexible pavement composed of a 0.10 m hot asphalt layer, a 0.25 m granular base and a 0.15 m granular subbase. In 2022, it began the construction of the structure that will protect the bases of the bridge, which interconnects the city center with the Panamericana Norte and the Vía de Evitamiento.

== See also ==
- Highway 1 (Peru)
