= Chilina Bridge =

Chilina Bridge Puente Chilina
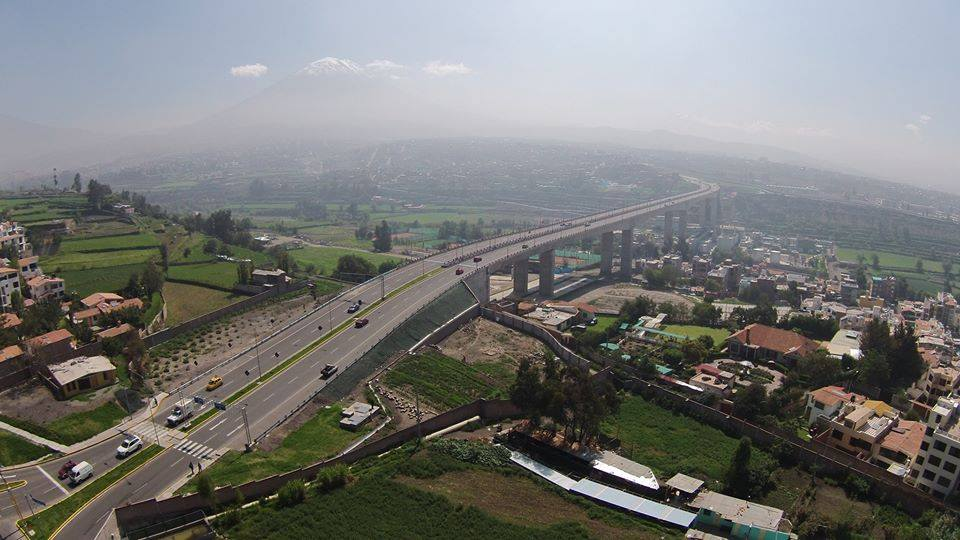
- Coordinates: 16°22′55.24″S 71°32′04.88″W
- Carries: Road traffic
- Crosses: Chili River
- Locale: Arequipa, Peru
- Other name: Mariano Melgar Valdivieso Bridge

Characteristics
- Design: Prestressed concrete box-girder bridge
- Material: Reinforced concrete
- Total length: 562 m (1,844 ft)
- Piers in water: 4

History
- Designer: Arenas & Asociados
- Built: 23 January 2013 - 23 November 2014
- Construction cost: S/ 260 million

Location
- Interactive map of Chilina Bridge

The Chilina Bridge (Spanish: Puente Chilina), also known as the Mariano Melgar Valdivieso Bridge (Spanish: Puente Mariano Melgar Valdivieso) is one of the longest bridges in Peru with a length of 562 meters, located in the city of Arequipa. It crosses the Chili River and connects the city districts of Alto Selva Alegre and Cayma. It has two parallel decks with a capacity of up to 3 lanes and the ability to withstand magnitude 9 earthquakes. It was inaugurated in 2014.

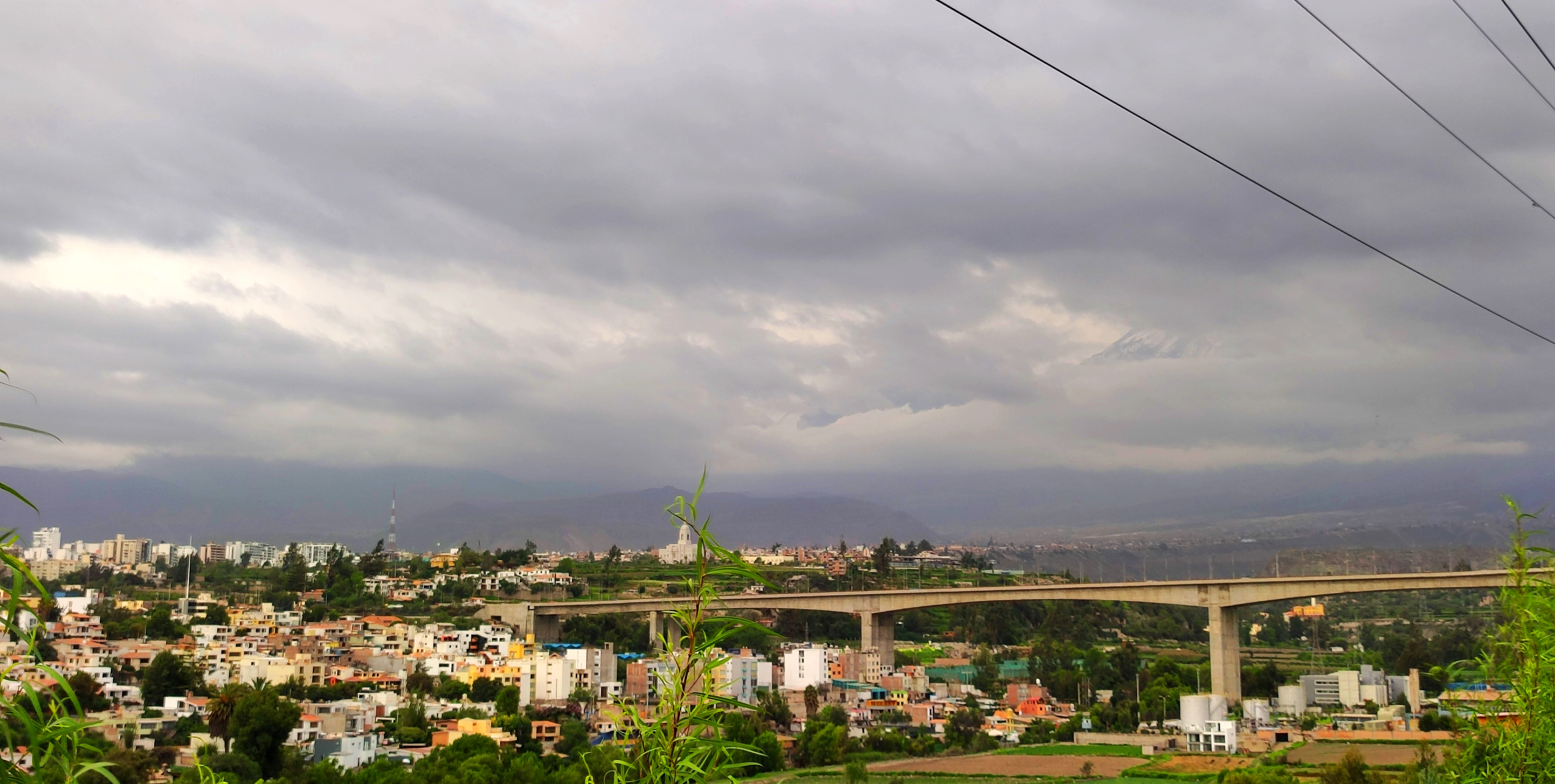
Chilina Bridge from Selva Alegre Park

== Architecture ==
The structure incorporates special analyses and a frame design with plastic hinges in the columns, whose reinforcement is joined by threaded mechanical connectors, in case of an extreme earthquake with a return period of 1000 years. In addition to special materials and elements, such as high-ductility steel in column reinforcement (A706), unique expansion joint devices in special abutments with a movement capacity of 560 mm, and fuses that prevent collapse. Because the bridge is located in a high seismicity zone, with a basic acceleration (PGA) of 0.6 g, adequate conditions are guaranteed against high-intensity seismic movements.
