= President Guillermo Billinghurst Bridge =

President Guillermo Billinghurst Bridge Puente Presidente Guillermo Billinghurst
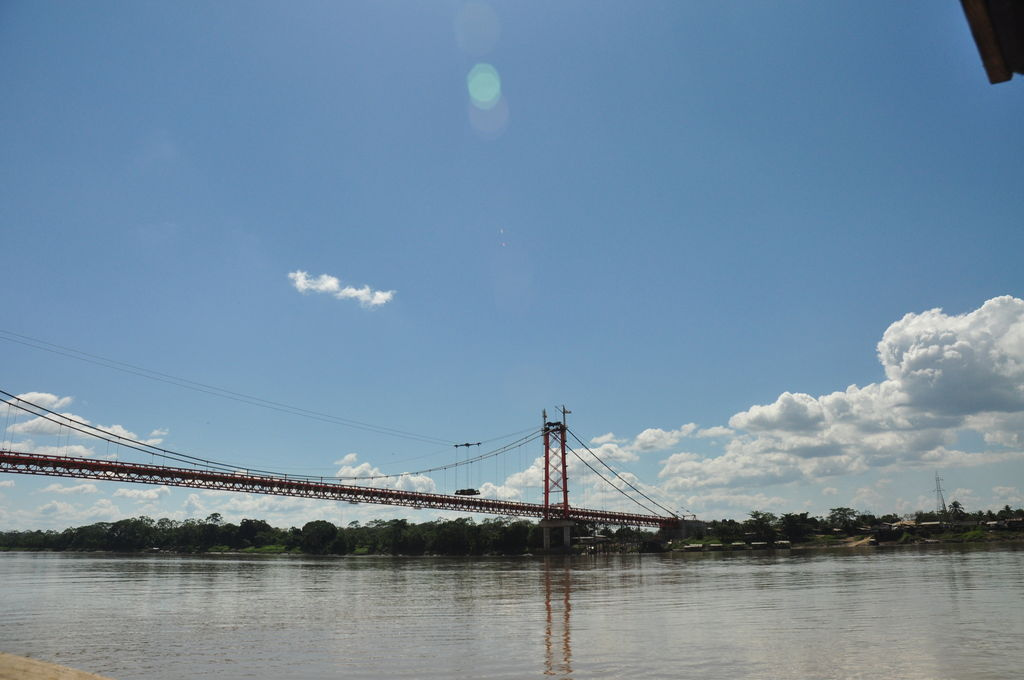
- Coordinates: 12.590747°S 69.173948°W
- Crosses: Madre de Dios River
- Locale: Puerto Maldonado, Madre de Dios Region, Peru
- Other name: Continental Bridge

Characteristics
- Design: Suspension bridge
- Material: Steel
- Total length: 722 m (2,369 ft)

History
- Opened: July 15, 2011

Location
- Interactive map of President Guillermo Billinghurst Bridge

The President Guillermo Billinghurst Bridge (Spanish: Puente Presidente Guillermo Billinghurst), also known as the Continental Bridge (Spanish: Puente Continental), is a steel suspension bridge located in Puerto Maldonado, Madre de Dios, Perú. It crosses the Madre de Dios river. It is the second longest bridge in Peru, after the Nanay Bridge in Iquitos. It was built as part of Section 3 of the Southern Interoceanic Highway Corridor Project.

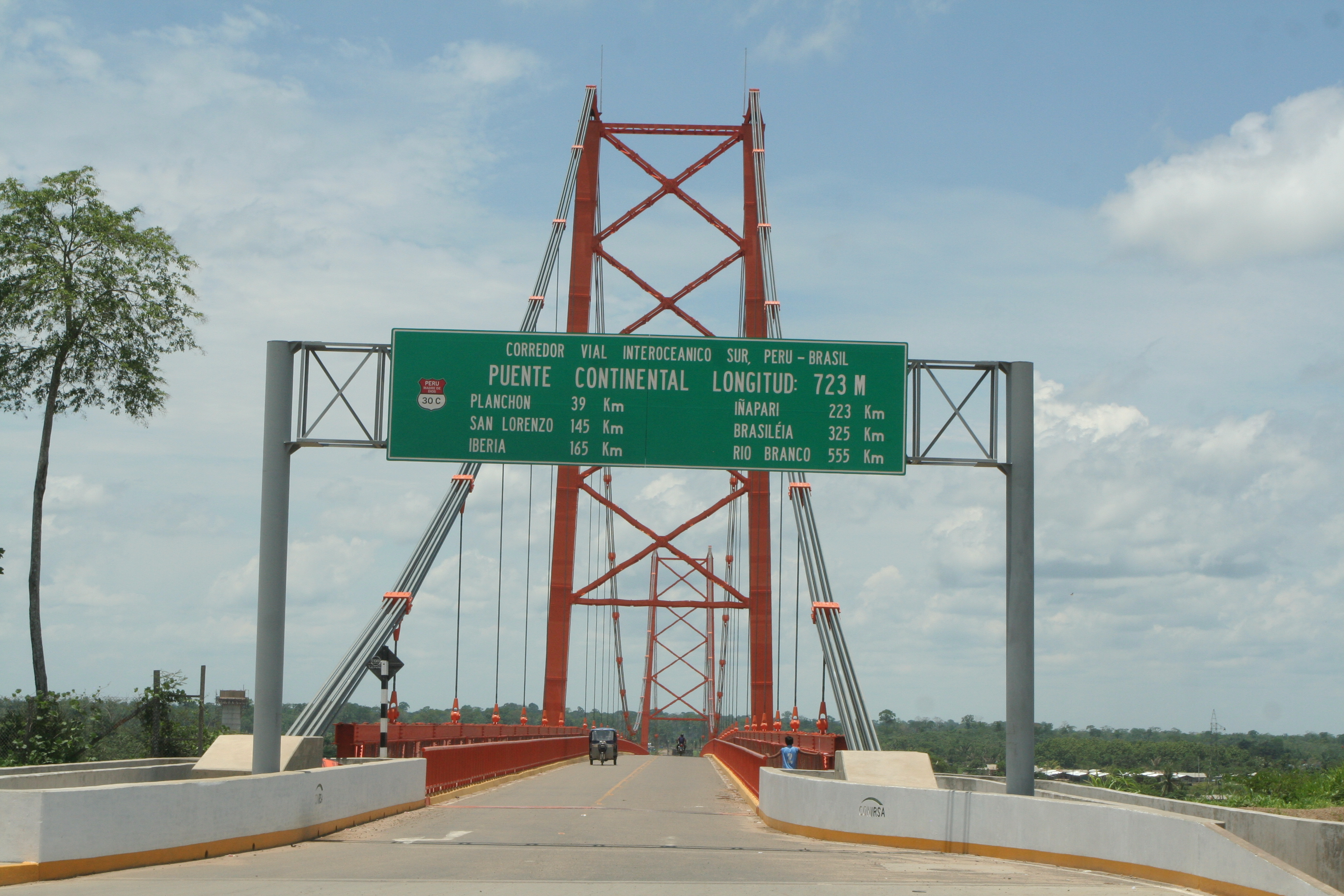
A sign on the bridge

Construction began in March 2010 and required an investment of $25.71 million. It was completed in 2011. It has a length of 722 meters.
