= San Bartolome District =

Coordinates: 11.9118°S 76.5292°W

San Bartolome
- District
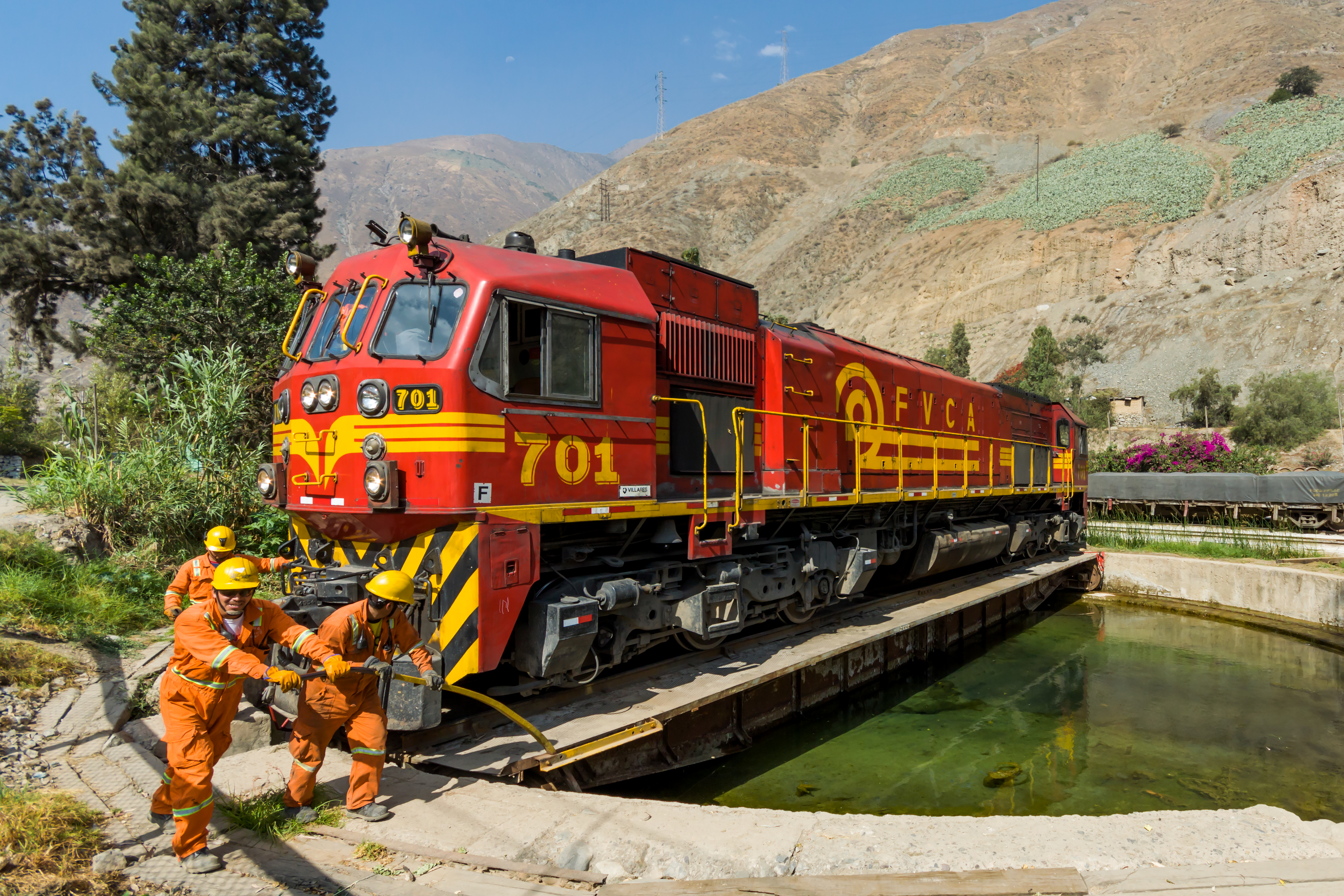
- Locomotive on the turntable at San Bartolomé, Peru
- Interactive map of San Bartolome
- Country: Peru
- Region: Lima
- Province: Huarochirí
- Founded: November 9, 1953
- Capital: San Bartolome

Government
  - Mayor: Rodrigo Enrique Chavez Vivas

Area
  - Total: 43.91 km^{2} (16.95 sq mi)
- Elevation: 1,600 m (5,200 ft)

Population (2017)
  - Total: 1,139
  - Density: 25.94/km^{2} (67.18/sq mi)
- Time zone: UTC-5 (PET)
- UBIGEO: 150717

San Bartolome District is one of thirty-two districts of the Huarochirí Province, located in the Department of Lima in Peru. The district was created by the Law No. 12001 in November 9, 1953, during the presidency of Manuel A. Odría. It encompasses an area of 43.91 km^{2}.
