= Carretera Central (Peru) =

Highway in Central Peru

National Route 22
- Ruta nacional 22
- Carretera Central; Central Highway
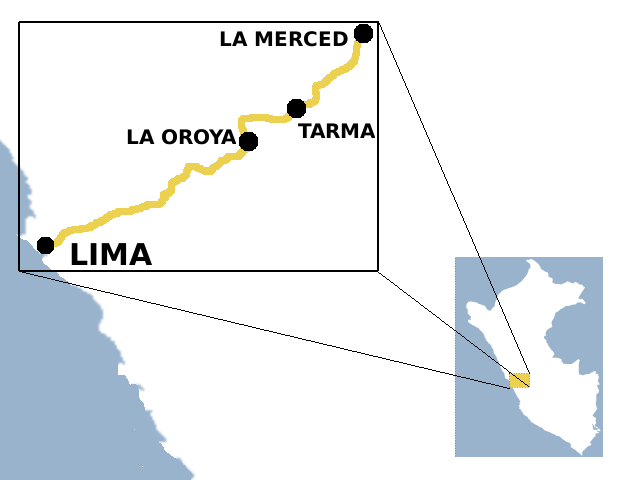

Route information
- Maintained by MTC
- Length: 173.66 km (107.91 mi)
- Existed: 1934–present

Location
- Country: Peru
- Major cities: Lima; La Oroya; Tarma; La Merced

Highway system
- Highways in Peru

The Carretera Central of Peru or National Route 22 is a two-lane highway that crosses through Central Peru. It begins in the city of Lima, and connects with the department of Junin in Central Peru. An update to the highway with an expansion to four lanes was announced in 2020 and is expected to be completed by 2025.

== Route description ==
Peru's Central Highway Interchange begins in Santa Anita at km 00 in the city of Lima. Since leaving the province of Lima, the road consists of a single tranche to the city of La Oroya, located in the province of Yauli, Junin. Currently the road of 173.66 kilometres (107.91 mi) is paved in its entirety. Between December and March, frequent landslides occur due to heavy rains. The maintenance of this route is in charge of National Provías, an agency under the Ministry of Transport and Communications of Peru.

== History ==
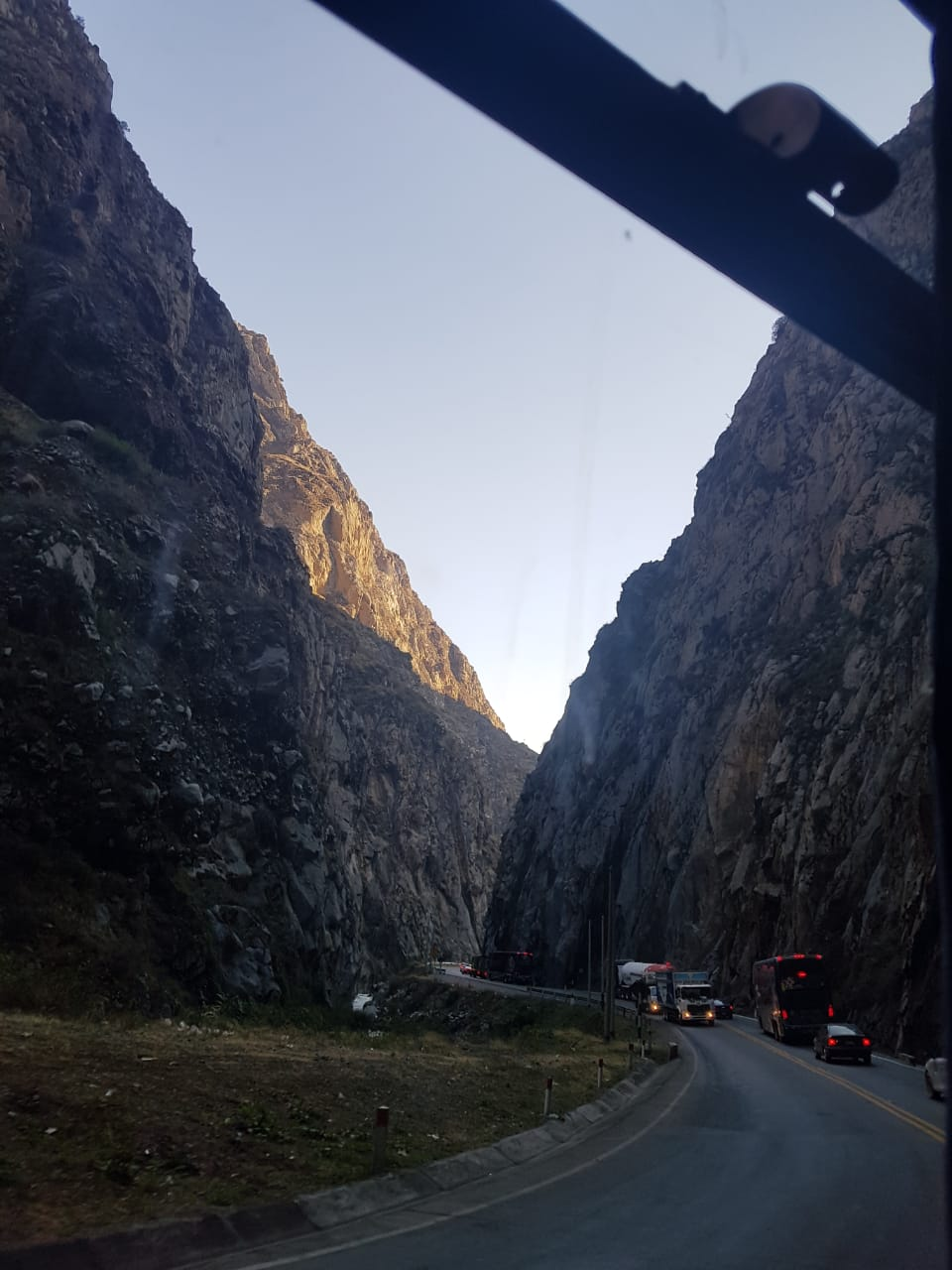
A view of Carretera Central in San Mateo District, Huarochirí

The construction of the Central Highway began in 1924 and completed in 1934. These works were carried out considering the vehicles and conditions of the time. A rolling surface was built in assertion material, with two lanes that reached 6.0 metres (19.7 ft) wide while the bridges were single-lane with sharp curves that prevented the passage of unarticulated trucks of two axles or more. In 1950 the Central Highway was improved; two-lane bridges were built and the road was expanded to 6.60 metres (21.7 ft) with berms on both sides, the road being conditioned for a traffic of 2,000 vehicles per day.

By the time that the highway's update was announced, more than 7,000 vehicles travelled the route per day, mostly trucks that provide food to Lima. The Ministry of Transport and Communications announced plans to update the highway in February 2020. The plan involved moving the origin of the highway from Santa Anita to Chaclacayo, with the route beginning at the interchange with Ramiro Prialé Highway, and expanding the roadway from two lanes to four. Travel from Lima to La Oroya would be at ninety minutes.

On 25 March 2021, it was announced that France would provide the technical oversight of construction and that the project would cost 11.5 billion Peruvian soles. The new highway is designed to include curves with more space, 30 kilometres (19 mi) of tunnels to prevent altitude increases and would be 136 kilometres (85 mi) at its estimated completion date of 2025.

== Major intersections and bridges ==
Road interchange Santa Anita (Empalme with PE-1N and PE-1S) - Santa Clara - Bridge Los Angeles - Chosica - Ricardo Palma - Puente Ricardo Palma - Puente Esperanza - Bridge Waterfall - Bridge Surco - Eduardo Bridge Habich - Puente Collana - Matucana bridge - Matucana - Huaripachi bridge - bridge LLican - Huallatupe bridge - Bridges Tamboraque I, II and III - San Mateo - Chicla - Open Anticona - Morococha - Pachachaca bridge - Santa Rosa de Sacco - Distribution La Oroya.
