= Highways in Peru =

The primary highways of Peru are assigned using a numeric designation and sometimes a name. Spur and loop routes are designated with the parent highway's number and a letter (excluding N or more than one occurrence of S).

Longitudinal highways (travelling north to south) are designated with odd numbers. They are numbered from smallest to largest from the west to the east.

Transverse highways (travelling east to west) are designated with even numbers. They are numbered from smallest to largest from the north to the south.

== North-South ==
- Highway 1 (1N) - Pan-American Highway (North) (Panamericana Norte)
- Highway 1 (1S) - Pan-American Highway (South) (Panamericana Sur)
- Highway 3 (3N) - Highland Road (North) (Longitudinal de la Sierra Norte)
- Highway 3 (3S) - Highland Road (South) (Longitudinal de la Sierra Sur)
- Highway 5 (5N) - Jungle Road (North) (Marginal de la Selva Norte)
- Highway 5 (5S) - Jungle Road (South) (Marginal de la Selva Sur)

== East-West ==
- Highway 2 (Paita to Huancabamba)
- Highway 4 (Bapo to Ayar Manco)
- Highway 6 (Pimentel to Chocabamba)
- Highway 8 (Pacasmayo to Yurimaguas)
- Highway 10 (Puerto Salaverry to Juanjui)
- Highway 14 (Casma to Huaraz)
- Highway 16 (Huaura to Pucallpa)
- Highway 20 (Lima to Cerro de Pasco)
- Highway 22 - Central Highway (Carretera Central - Lima to Chanchamayo)
- Highway 22A - Autopista Ramiro Prialé
- Highway 24 (Cañete to Huancayo)
- Highway 26 (Puerto San Juan to Iñapari)
- Highway 28 (Arequipa to Combapata)
- Highway 28A - Route of the Liberators (Vía de los Libertadores - Punta Pejerrey to San Francisco)
- Highway 30 (Puerto Matarani to Inambari)
- Highway 32 (Humajalzo to Puno)
- Highway 34 (Ilo to Ilave)
- Highway 36 (Tacna to Mazocruz)
- Highway 40 (Tacna to Collpa)

== Sources ==
- MTC (Ministry of Transportation and Communications) north-south highways page
- MTC (Ministry of Transportation and Communications) east-west highways page
