= Nukufaiau =

Island in Tonga

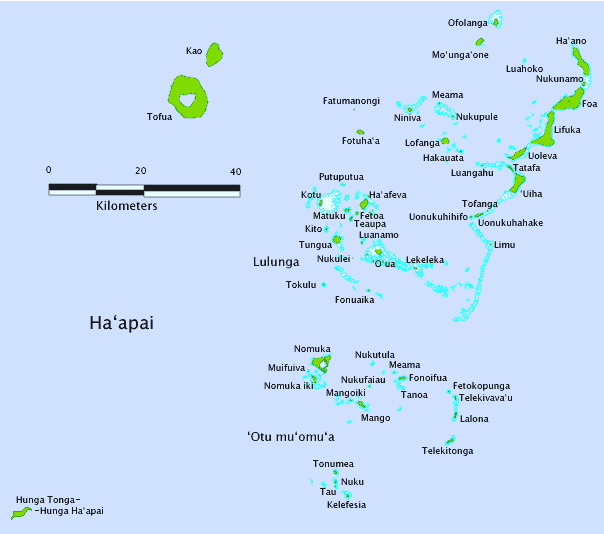
- Interactive map of Nukufaiau

Geography
- Location: South Pacific
- Coordinates: 20.294°S 174.694°W
- Archipelago: Haʻapai
- Highest elevation: 27 m (89 ft)

Administration
- Tonga
- Division: Haʻapai

Nukufaiau (also: Fetokobuga, Fetokobunga) is an island in the Haʻapai archipelago that belongs to the Kingdom of Tonga. Among neighboring islands are Nukutula, Kelefesia, Nomuka, Tonumea, Fonoifua, Telekitonga, Muifuiva.

== Geography ==
The island lies in the center of ʻOtu Muʻomuʻa along with Nukutula. To the east are the islands of Tanoa and Meama, as well as the reefs of Mai Reef and Lua Anga. To the south, Mango is the closest island.

== Climate ==
The climate is tropical, but it is moderated by constantly blowing winds. Like the other islands in the Ha'apai group, Nukufaiau is occasionally hit by cyclones.
