= List of islands by name (F) =

This article features a list of islands sorted by their name beginning with the letter F.

== F ==
Island's Name	Island group(s)	Country/Countries
Fænø	Islands of the Little Belt	Denmark
Fabiacet (Fabiajet)	Raja Ampat Islands	Indonesia
Faial	Azores	Portugal
Failaka	Persian Gulf	Kuwait
Fairbank	Fairbank Lake, Ontario	Canada
Fairly Lake	Stoney Lake, Ontario	Canada
Fahie	Leeward Islands	Saint Kitts and Nevis
Fakarava	Palliser Islands, Tuamotus, French Polynesia	France
Fallen Jerusalem	British Virgin Islands	United Kingdom
False Duck	Lake Ontario, Ontario	Canada
Falster		Denmark
Fancy Point Towhead	Mississippi River, Louisiana	United States
Fangataufa	Tuamotus, French Polynesia	France
Fanny	North Channel, Ontario	Canada
Fanø	North Frisian Islands	Denmark
Fara	The South Isles, Orkney Islands	Scotland
Farasan	Farasan Islands	Saudi Arabia
Faray	The North Isles, Orkney Islands	Scotland
Farkas-sziget	Tisza	Hungary
Faro	Algarve islands	Portugal
Fårö	Gotland	Sweden
Farsi	Persian Gulf	Iran
Fastnet Rock	County Cork	Ireland
Fatuma		Eritrea
Fauro	Shortland Islands	Solomon Islands
Favignana	Aegadian Islands	Italy
Fawn	St. Clair River, Ontario	Canada
Fehmarn		Germany
Fejø		Denmark
Félicité	Inner Islands of the Seychelles	Seychelles
Felsőzátonyi-sziget	Danube River	Hungary
Femø		Denmark
Fernando de Noronha		Brazil
Fern Island	Bermuda	United Kingdom
Ferny	Lower Lough Erne	Ireland
Fetlar	Shetland Islands	Scotland
Fetokopunga	Haʻapai archipelago	Tonga
Fidra	Islands of the Forth	Scotland
Fifi	Barataria Bay, Louisiana	United States
Fighting	Detroit River, Ontario	Canada
Filfla	Maltese islands	Malta
Finnøy	Ryfylke Islands, Rogaland	Norway
Fish Holm	Shetland Islands	Scotland
Fish	Matanzas River, Florida	United States
Fish	Lake Winnipesaukee, New Hampshire	United States
Fisherman	Chesapeake Bay, Virginia	United States
Fitzwilliam	Lake Huron, Ontario	Canada
Five	Leeward Islands	Antigua and Barbuda
Five	North Channel, Ontario	Canada
Five	Willamette River, Oregon	United States
Five Star	Bermuda	United Kingdom
Fivemile	Lake Winnipesaukee, New Hampshire	United States
Finnhamn	Stockholm archipelago	Sweden
Fjandø	Islands of Nissum Fjord	Denmark
Flaherty	Belcher Islands, Nunavut	Canada
Flakstadøya	Lofoten	Norway
Flanigan	Mississippi River, Illinois	United States
Flat Jason	Jason Islands of the Falkland Islands	United Kingdom
Flat	Spratly Islands	Disputed between People's Republic of China, Republic of China, Vietnam, Brunei, Philippines, and Malaysia
Flat Holm	Bristol Channel	United Kingdom
Flattop	San Juan Islands, Washington	United States
Flekkerøy	Agder	Norway
Flinders	Bass Strait, Tasmania	Australia
Flint	Line Islands	Kiribati
Florence	Lake Rosseau, Ontario	Canada
Flores	Azores	Portugal
Flores	Lesser Sunda Islands	Indonesia
Flotta	The South Isles, Orkney Islands	Scotland
Flowerpot	Georgian Bay, Ontario	Canada
Fluor	Lake Superior, Ontario	Canada
Fodu	Zhoushan Archipelago	People's Republic of China
Fogn	Island in Stavanger Municipality, Ryfylke Islands, Rogaland	Norway
Fogo	Newfoundland and Labrador	Canada
Fogo	Sotavento archipelago	Cape Verde
Fonoifua	Haʻapai	Tonga
Föhr	North Frisian Islands	Germany
Folegandros	Cyclades	Greece
Foley	Nunavut	Canada
Fora	Estremadura islands	Portugal
Forked Deer	Mississippi River, Tennessee and Arkansas	United States
Formentera	Illes Pitiüses group of the Balearic Islands	Spain
Formoza	Artificial island at Gdynia	Poland
Fornation	Timbalier Bay, Louisiana	United States
Forur Bozorg	Persian Gulf	Iran
Forur Koochak	Persian Gulf	Iran
Forurgan	Persian Gulf	Iran
Foster	Georgian Bay, Ontario	Canada
Fota	The Grenadines in the Windward Islands	Grenada
Fota	Cork Harbour	Ireland
Foula	Shetland Islands	Scotland
Fourer	Lesser Antilles	Saint Lucia
Fourmile	French River, Ontario	Canada
Fournoi		Greece
Fourteen Mile	Allegheny River, Pennsylvania	United States
Fous	Lesser Antilles	Saint Lucia
Fox	Buckhorn Lake, Ontario	Canada
Fox	Georgian Bay, Ontario	Canada
Fox	Lake Simcoe, Ontario	Canada
Fox	Charles River, Massachusetts	United States
Frøya	Trøndelag	Norway
Franklin	Greenland	Denmark
Franklin	Georgian Bay, Ontario	Canada
Frégate Island	Seychelles	Seychelles
Freixial	Alentejo islands	Portugal
Fremont	Great Salt Lake, Utah	United States
French Cay	Greater Antilles	Dominican Republic
French	Western Port	Australia
French	Mississippi River, Wisconsin	United States
French Island No. 1	Ohio River, Kentucky	United States
French Island No. 2	Ohio River, Kentucky	United States
French River	Georgian Bay, Ontario	Canada
Frenchman's Cay	British Virgin Islands	United Kingdom
Friars	Leeward Islands	Saint Kitts and Nevis
Frégate	Lesser Antilles	Saint Lucia
Frigate	The Grenadines in the Windward Islands	Grenada
Frigate	The Grenadines in the Windward Islands	Saint Vincent and the Grenadines
Fritz	Schuylkill River, Pennsylvania	United States
Frösön		Sweden
Fryingpan	Georgian Bay, Ontario	Canada
Fuerteventura	Canary Islands	Spain
Fugloy	Faroe Islands	Denmark
Funen		Denmark
Funk	Newfoundland and Labrador	Canada
Fur	Islands of Limfjord	Denmark
Furzey	Poole Harbour, Dorset, England	United Kingdom
Futuna	Pacific Ocean	Vanuatu

== See also ==
- List of islands (by country)
- List of islands by area
- List of islands by population
- List of islands by highest point
