= Fetokopunga =

Island in Tonga

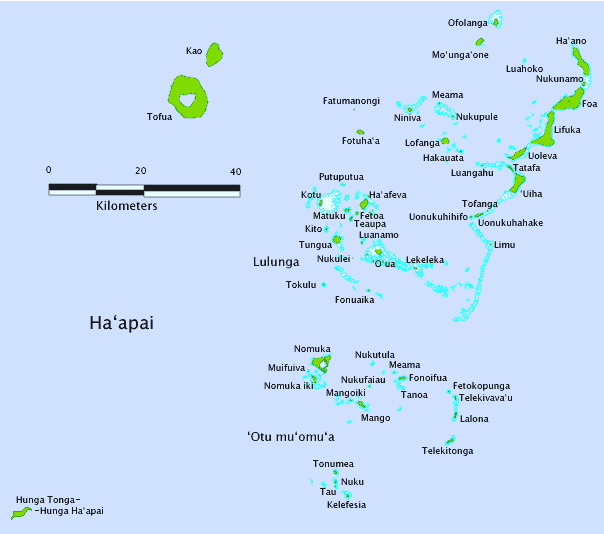
- Interactive map of Fetokopunga

Geography
- Location: South Pacific
- Coordinates: 20.302°S 174.534°W
- Archipelago: Haʻapai
- Highest elevation: 27 m (89 ft)

Administration
- Tonga
- Division: Haʻapai

Fetokopunga (also: Fetokobuga, Fetokobunga) is an island in the Haʻapai archipelago that belongs to the Kingdom of Tonga. Among neighboring islands are Nukutula, Kelefesia, Nomuka, Nukufaiau, Tonumea, Fonoifua, Telekitonga.

== Geography ==
The island lies to the east of 'Otu Mu'omu'a as the northernmost tip of the 'Otu Tolu Group, whose islands Telekivava'u, Nukutavake and Telekiha'apai, and Telekitonga join to the south.

== Climate ==
The climate is tropical, but moderated by constantly blowing winds. Like the other islands in the Ha'apai group, Telekitonga is occasionally hit by cyclones.
