= 2022 Hunga Tonga–Hunga Haʻapai eruption and tsunami =

Volcanic event in the South Pacific Ocean

- Satellite animation of the initial ash plume and shockwave on 15 January 2022
- Volcano: Hunga Tonga–Hunga Haʻapai
- Start date: 20 December 2021 (Note: The volcano was declared dormant on 11 January after the December 2021 eruption sequence ended.)
- End date: 15 January 2022
- Type: Surtseyan, Phreatoplinian
- Location: Pacific Ocean, Tonga; 20.550°S 175.385°W
- VEI: 5–6
- Impact: 7 dead, 19 injured, and others reported missing. $182 million in damage in Tonga

In December 2021, an eruption began on Hunga Tonga–Hunga Haʻapai, a submarine volcano in the Tongan archipelago in the southern Pacific Ocean. The eruption reached a very large and powerful climax nearly four weeks later, on 15 January 2022. Hunga Tonga–Hunga Haʻapai is 65 kilometres (40 mi) north of Tongatapu, the country's main island, and is part of the highly active Tonga–Kermadec Islands volcanic arc, a subduction zone extending from New Zealand to Fiji. On the Volcanic Explosivity Index scale, the eruption was rated at least a VEI-5. Described by scientists as a "magma hammer", the volcano at its height produced a series of four underwater thrusts, displaced 10 cubic kilometres (2.4 cu mi) of rock, ash and sediment, and generated the largest atmospheric explosion recorded by modern instrumentation.

The eruption produced a volcanic tsunami that affected Tonga, Fiji, American Samoa, Samoa, Vanuatu, New Zealand, Japan, the United States, the Russian Far East, Chile and Peru. At least four people were killed, some were injured, and some remain possibly missing in Tonga from tsunami waves up to 20 m (66 ft) high. Tsunami waves with run-up heights up to 45 m (148 ft) struck the uninhabited island of Tofua. Two people drowned in Peru when 2 m (6 ft 7 in) waves struck the coast, while another died of indirect causes in Fiji. It was the largest volcanic eruption since the 1991 eruption of Mount Pinatubo. NASA determined that the eruption was "hundreds of times more powerful" than Little Boy. The eruption was the largest explosion recorded in the atmosphere by modern instrumentation, far larger than any 20th-century volcanic event or nuclear bomb test. It is thought that in recent centuries, only the Krakatoa eruption of 1883 rivalled the atmospheric disturbance produced.

== Volcanic activity ==
=== December 2021 ===
After staying dormant since 2014, the Hunga Tonga–Hunga Haʻapai volcano erupted on 20 December 2021, sending particulates into the stratosphere. A large plume of ash was visible from Nukuʻalofa, the capital city of Tonga, about 70 km (43 mi) from the volcano. The Volcanic Ash Advisory Center (VAAC) in Wellington, New Zealand, issued an advisory notice to airlines. This initial eruption ended at 02:00 on 21 December 2021.

On 22 and 23 December 2021, 8-to-14-kilometre-high (5.0 to 8.7 mi) plumes containing sulfur dioxide drifted to the north-north-east and spread over the Niuatoputapu, Haʻapai and Vavaʻu island groups. Surtseyan explosions, steam plumes and steam bursts were recorded by a Tonga Navy crew on 23 December 2021, during which time the first ground-based images of the eruption were created.

Between 24 and 27 December 2021, steam and gas emissions reached altitudes of 10.3–12.2 kilometres (6.4–7.6 mi). Ash plumes reached heights of only 3 km (1.9 mi), depositing ash only adjacent to the volcano. On 25 December 2021, satellite imagery revealed that the island had increased in size by 300–600 metres (980–1,970 ft) on its eastern side. During 29–30 December 2021, several surges of Surtseyan activity occurred, some of which were witnessed by passengers on a small South Seas Charters boat. Eruption plumes during the second half of December 2021 interrupted air travel to Tonga multiple times.

=== January 2022 ===
As activity on the island decreased, it was declared dormant by the Tonga Geological Services on 11 January 2022. However, a large eruption commenced on 14 January 2022 at 04:20 local time (15:20 UTC, 13 January), sending clouds of ash 20 km (12 mi) into the atmosphere. The government of Tonga issued a tsunami warning to residents, and waves of 30 cm (12 in) were observed in Nuku'alofa. Later in the afternoon, Tongan geologists near the volcano observed explosions and a 5-kilometre-wide (3.1 mi) ash column between 17:00 and 18:30 local time. A much larger Plinian eruption started the following day (15 January 2022) at 17:14 local time (04:14:45 UTC, 15 January). The eruption column from this eruption rose 58 km (36 mi) into the mesosphere. The VAAC again issued an advisory notice to airlines. Ash from the eruption made landfall on the main island of Tongatapu, blotting out the sun. Loud explosions were heard 65 km (40 mi) away in Nukuʻalofa, and small stones and ash rained down from the sky. Many residents in Tonga were stuck in traffic whilst attempting to flee to higher ground.

A four-hour observation of the January 2022 eruption over the southern Pacific Ocean from the GOES-West satellite

Shockwave from the Hunga Tonga eruption captured by GOES-17 (GOES-West) and shown using the Mid-level Water Vapor

The explosion was heard in Samoa, roughly 840 km (520 mi) away before the sound travelled to more distant countries. Residents in Fiji, more than 700 km (430 mi) away, described the sounds of thunder, while the "thump" of the eruption was also reported in Niue and Vanuatu. Tremors and shaking buildings were reported by residents in south-western Niue, around Alofi and Avatele. The United States Geological Survey estimated the eruption at a surface-wave magnitude of 5.8. (Note: This is an explosion which magnitude was calculated using techniques calibrated for earthquakes.) The eruption was heard more than 2,000 km (1,200 mi) away in New Zealand, where the sound arrived two hours later. A series of bangs were heard around 3:30 a.m. local time in and around Anchorage, Alaska, approximately 9,300 km (5,800 mi) away from the volcano, lasting about 30 minutes. Low-frequency noise persisted for approximately two hours. Booms were heard as far away as Yukon in Canada, 9,700 km (6,000 mi) away.

The volcanic explosion caused atmospheric shockwaves to propagate around the globe. Satellites visually captured shockwaves propagating across the Pacific Ocean and a very wide eruption column. The pressure wave was measured by weather stations in many locations, including New Zealand to a maximum amplitude of about 7 hPa, and Australia to 6.9 hPa at Lord Howe Island and 3.3 hPa at Perth. Even in Europe, a pressure fluctuation of 2.5 hPa was measured in Switzerland, and of just over 2 hPa when it reached the United Kingdom. Shockwaves were reported as having gone around the Earth as many as four times in Japan and Utah, and at least twice at the Blue Hill Meteorological Observatory in Massachusetts. The pressure shockwave was also observed in Chennai, India, which is 12,000 km from the eruption site.

Intense lightning activity was recorded during the eruption phase. The Vaisala Global Lightning Dataset GLD360 detected lightning in the form of radio waves. Several hundred to a thousand flashes of lightning were recorded by the system during the two weeks before the eruption. From 14 to 15 January 2022, tens of thousands of lightning flashes occurred. Between 05:00 and 06:00 UTC on 15 January 2022, 200,000 flashes were recorded.

Preliminary observations showed that the eruption column ejected a large amount of volcanic material into the stratosphere, leading to speculation that it would cause a temporary climate cooling effect. Later calculations showed it injected an estimated 400,000 tonnes of sulfur dioxide into the stratosphere and was unlikely to have any global cooling effect. Despite this, the eruption had a cooling effect in the Southern Hemisphere, causing slight cooling of winters and spectacular sunsets. People living in the Southern Hemisphere experienced purple sunsets for a few months after the eruption. A cooling effect of 0.1–0.5 °C (0.18–0.90 °F) was expected to last until spring (September–November) 2022. The eruption was described as a once-in-a-thousand-year event for the Hunga caldera.

NASA satellite Aura detected the eruption using its microwave limb sounder. It measures ozone, water vapor and other atmospheric gases, and can penetrate obstacles such as ash clouds. The underwater explosion also sent 146 million tons of water from the South Pacific Ocean into the stratosphere. The amount of water vapor ejected was 10 percent of the stratosphere's typical stock. It was enough to temporarily warm the surface of Earth. It is estimated that an excess of water vapour should remain for 5–10 years.

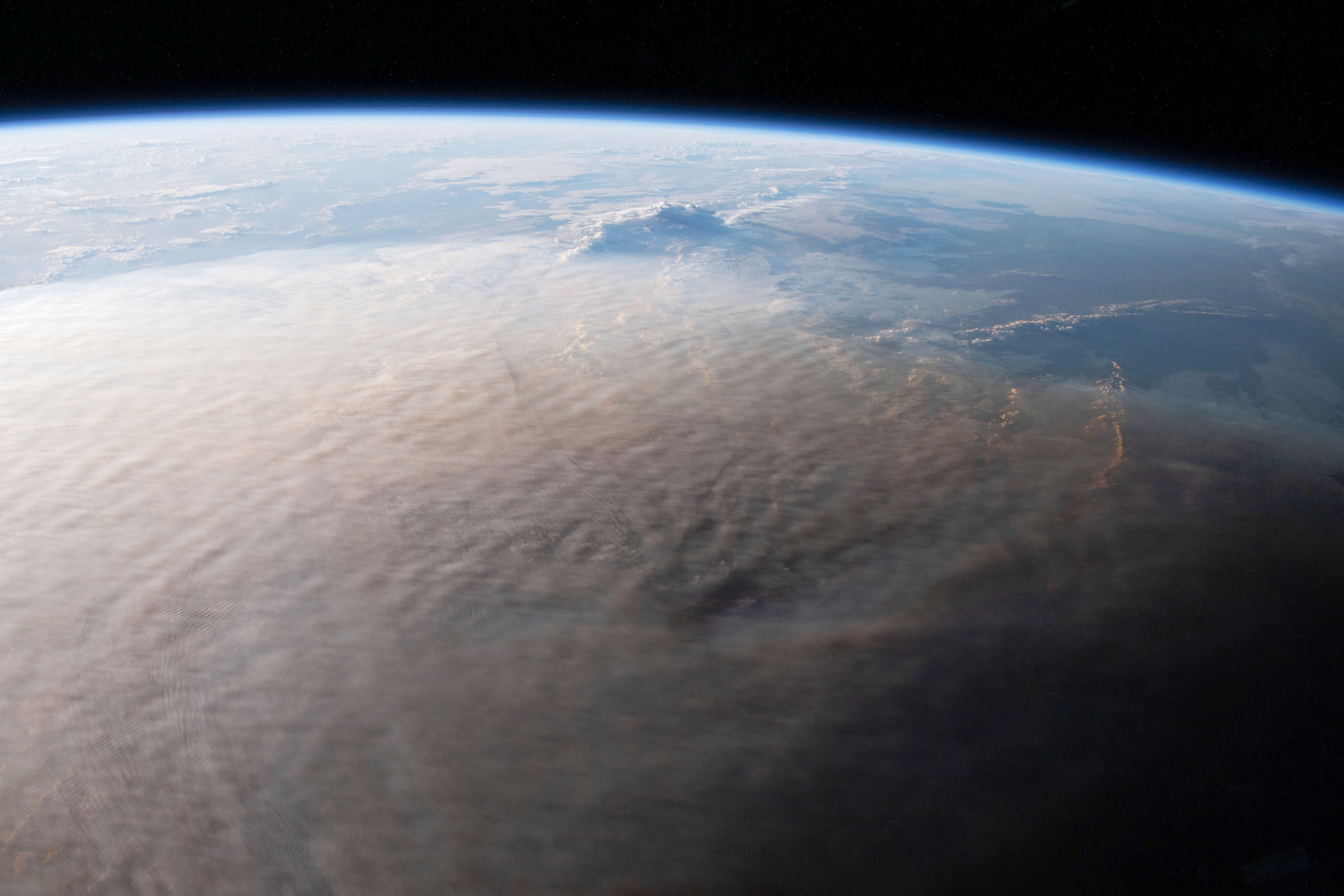
An image from the International Space Station of the spreading high-altitude smoke cloud

=== Academic research ===
According to a March 2022 paper in the journal Earthquake Research Advances (ERA), Hunga Tonga–Hunga Haʻapai's plume reached a peak height of 58 kilometres (36 mi) into the atmosphere and sustained heights greater than 30 km (19 mi). The initial explosive event was possibly more powerful than the Hatepe eruption, even though Hatepe ejected over ten times the volume of material in a longer eruption. Hunga Tonga–Hunga Haʻapai erupted over a span of 12 hours, releasing 1.9 km^{3} (0.46 cu mi) of ejecta with an estimated mass of 2,900 teragrams.

Although the eruption energy was soon estimated from the acoustic waves and the ash cloud, its ranking on the Volcanic Explosivity Index (VEI) is still debated. The ERA paper says the eruption correlated to a VEI of 5–6. An April 2022 research paper led by Poli and Shapiro and published by the American Geophysical Union indicates that the eruption is the largest ever observed with modern instrumentation and estimates its VEI to be approximately 6. Meanwhile, Vergoz and others estimate the blast yield to be 100–200 megatons of TNT and place the corresponding VEI at 5.8. Likewise, a study by Diaz and Rigby estimates the energetic output of the eruption to be equivalent to 61 megatons of TNT, making the event more powerful than the largest nuclear bomb ever detonated (Tsar Bomba). The Smithsonian Institution Global Volcanism Program rated the eruption at VEI-5, while others have rated the eruption at VEI-4.

Atmospheric Lamb waves were recorded by 50 barographs around the world. This data later served as verification of a new source model for volcanic explosions. The model provides a theoretical explanation for the anomalously long Lamb waves generated by major eruptions and also forms the basis for a method for assessing the composition of volcanic gases solely from distant records.

The ERA paper also concludes that this eruption resulted in the formation of a new caldera. In May 2022, scientists at the National Institute of Water and Atmospheric Research (NIWA) released a bathymetry map indicating a large caldera measuring 4 km (2.5 mi) in width formed from the eruption. Surveys also indicated that the caldera floor is located 850 m (2,790 ft) below sea level. According to a volcanologist, the caldera walls continue to experience ongoing collapses. Surveys of the seafloor around the volcano found large sediment piles, layers of fine mud and ash, and valleys up to 50 km (31 mi) from the volcano. The survey indicated that an estimated 6–7 km^{3} (1.4–1.7 cu mi) of debris was added to a 22,000-square-kilometre-area (8,500 mi^{2}) seafloor. Scientists also suggest that the volcano may still be erupting underwater.

A 2022 study in the journal Ocean Engineering by Heidarzadeh and others determined the size of the initial tsunami caused by the eruption. The study analyzed data from 22 tide gauges, eight Deep-ocean Assessment and Reporting of Tsunamis (DART) stations, eight atmospheric pressure time series, spectral analysis and computer simulation. It was concluded that the eruption displaced 6.6 km^{3} of seawater, 90 m (300 ft) in amplitude, with a length of 12 km (7.5 mi). The displacement generated a number of waves in the atmosphere, including Lamb waves in the troposphere and gravity waves in higher layers of the atmosphere, which propagated around the world at speeds close to the speed of sound.

In mid-May 2024, University of Rhode Island oceanographer Roxanne Beinart published a study in the journal Nature Communications Earth and Environment which concluded that the eruption blanketed the surrounding ocean floor with ash for several months, decimating the local marine wildlife. Beinart had led a research cruise in the South Pacific in April 2022 to research underwater biology living around deep-sea hot springs in the region. She found that the site near the volcano was covered in ash, with some of it even at a depth of 2.4 km (1.5 mi) underwater.

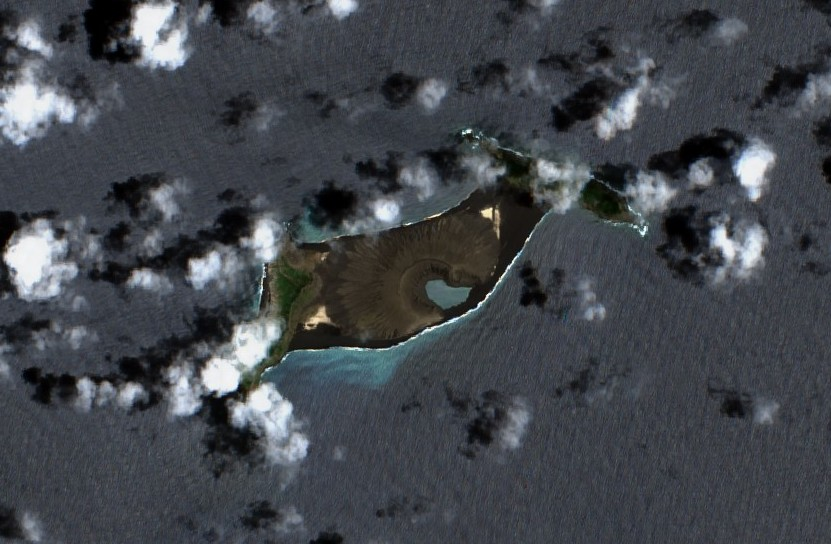
Hunga Tonga-Hunga Haʻapai in December 2021

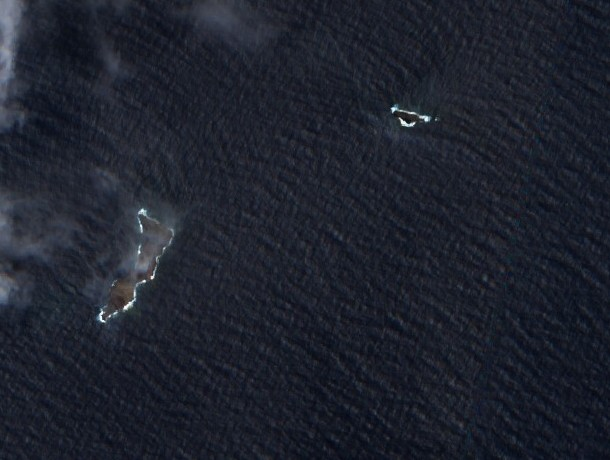
Hunga Tonga-Hunga Haʻapai in February 2022, after the eruption

=== Climate and atmospheric impact ===
The eruption produced a massive eruption column, reaching heights of 57 kilometres (35 mi) and thus breaking into the mesosphere. This is the highest recorded eruption column since Krakatoa's in 1883, which extended up to 80 km (50 mi) high. The column developed two "umbrella"-like clouds, one at 31 km (19 mi) in height and the other at 17 km (11 mi), and generated a terrestrial gamma-ray flash. The column ejected a large quantity of water into the stratosphere, where it disturbed the local temperature balance and caused the formation of anomalous winds.

Large volcanic eruptions can inject large amounts of sulfur dioxide into the stratosphere, causing the formation of aerosol layers that reflect sunlight and can cause a cooling of the climate. In contrast, during the Hunga Tonga–Hunga Haʻapai eruption this sulfur was accompanied by large amounts of water vapour, which by acting as a greenhouse gas overrode the aerosol effect and caused a net warming of the climate system. One study estimated a 7% increase in the probability that global warming will exceed 1.5 °C (2.7 °F) in at least one of the next five years, although greenhouse gas emissions and climate policy to mitigate them remain the major determinant of this risk. Another study estimated that the water vapor will stay in the stratosphere for up to eight years, and influence winter weather in both hemispheres. More recent studies have indicated that the eruption had a slight cooling effect.

In September 2023, the Antarctic ozone hole was one of the largest on record, at 26 million square kilometers. The anomalously large ozone loss may have been a result of the Hunga Tonga–Hunga Haʻapai eruption.

== Tsunami ==
Nuku'alofa Tonga
- Video of the tsunami waves hitting the capital, filmed by a resident, Mamani moe me'a fakaofō on YouTube

Tsunamis are most frequently caused by earthquakes, while those caused by volcanic eruptions are rare. Fewer than 100 volcanic tsunamis were recorded in the prior two centuries. According to an official at GNS Science, the suspected cause of the tsunami was an undersea eruption that destroyed part of the island on 14 January. This allowed seawater to fill the volcanic vent, causing another undersea explosion the next day. The explosion was sufficiently large that it was able to penetrate through the overlying seawater and trigger the tsunami.

Importantly, the atmospheric waves caused by the explosion coupled to the ocean, generating additional tsunamis at large distances from the volcano; volcanic tsunamis normally do not reach far from the edifice. Tsunami forecast models and alert systems which were intended to work for earthquake-generated tsunamis failed to consider the effects of the shockwaves on the tsunami as it radiated outwards. Shockwaves from the eruption caused abnormally high waves along the coasts of Peru and Japan. The tsunami waves also struck the coasts earlier than had been forecast.

=== Oceania ===
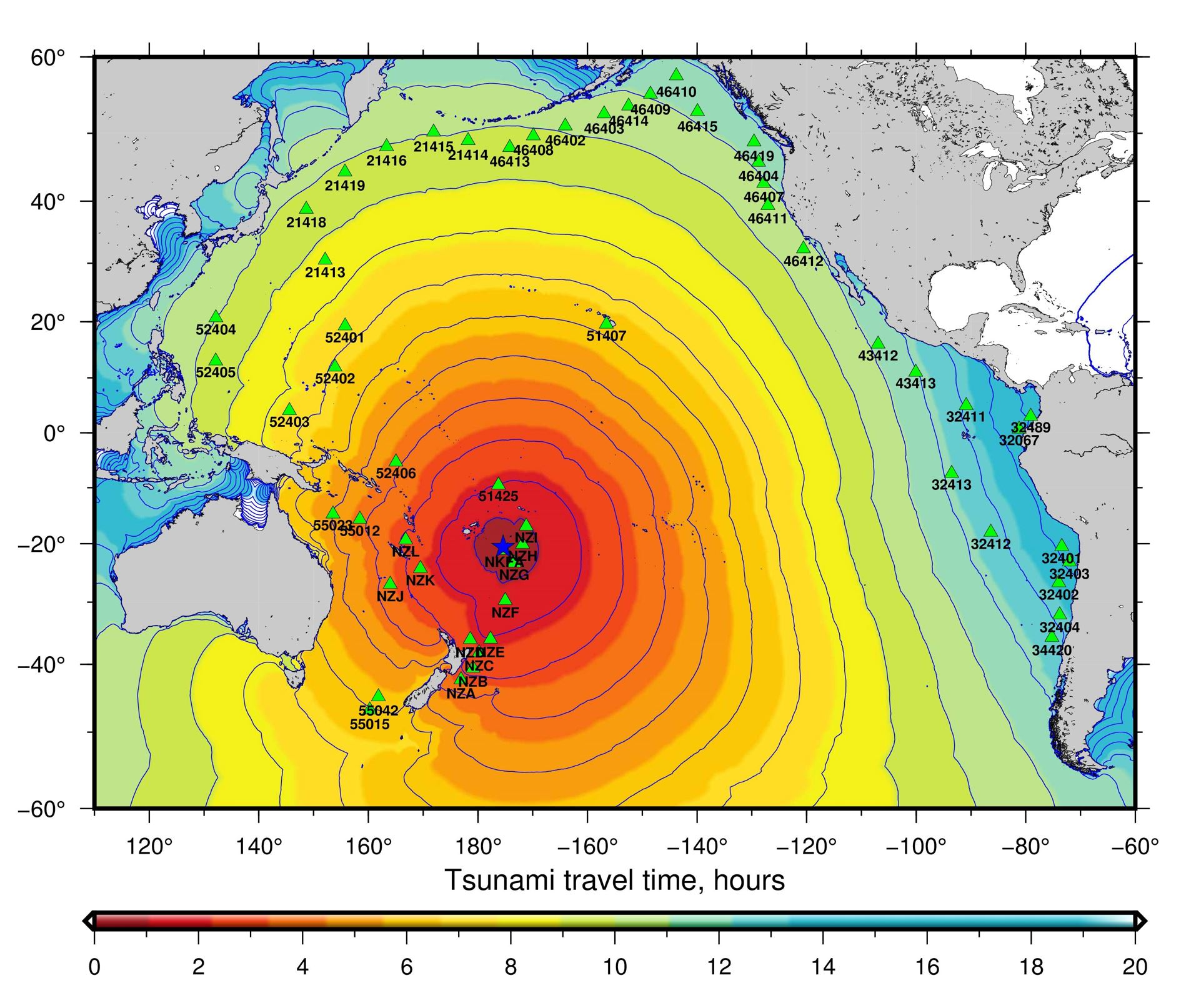
Travel time of the tsunami across the Pacific

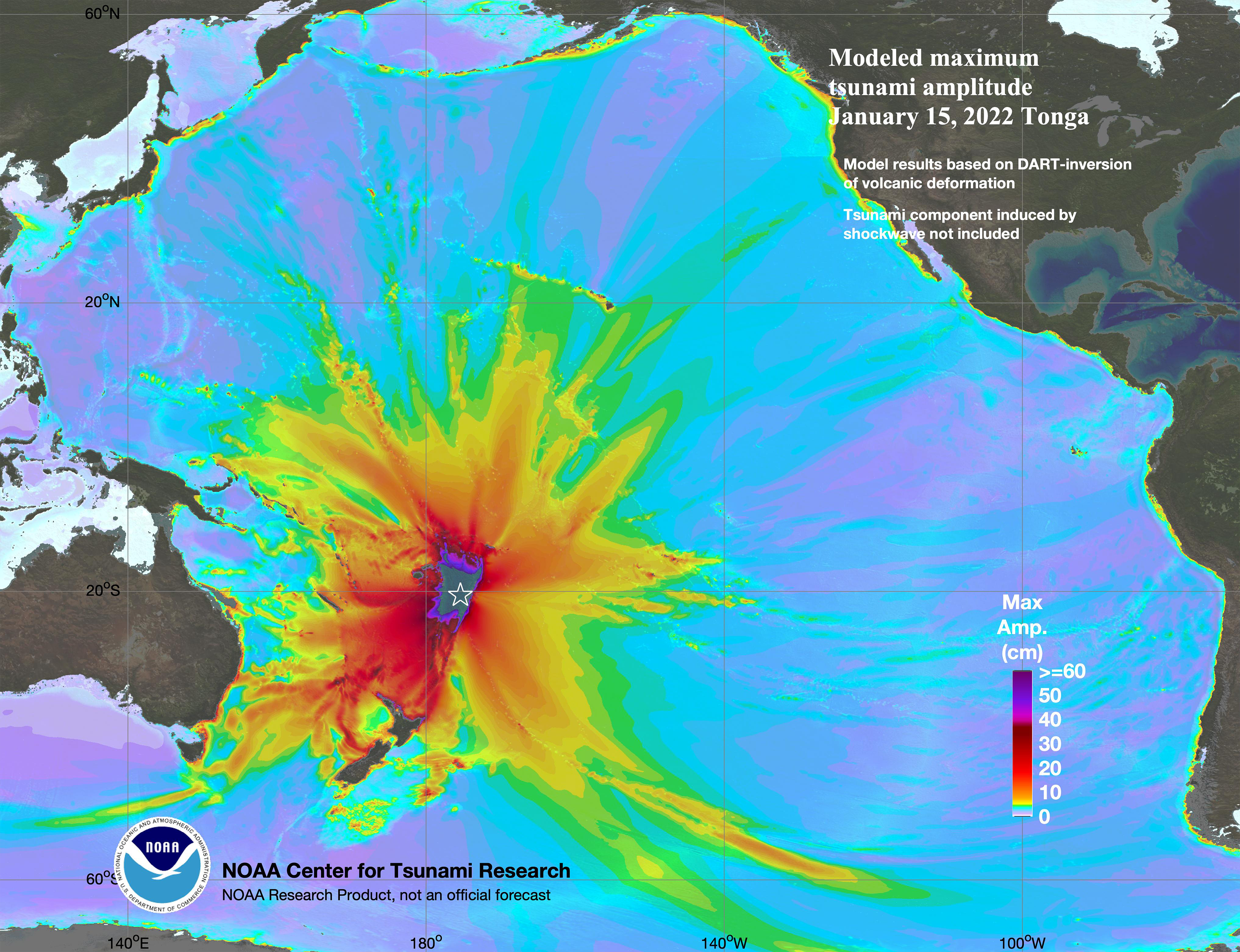
NOAA tsunami energy map on Hunga Tonga–Hunga Haʻapai

As a result of the eruption, a 1.2 m (3 ft 11 in) tsunami struck the Tongan capital Nukuʻalofa. Tide gauges in the city recorded waves 1.5–2 m (4 ft 11 in – 6 ft 7 in) in height. Videos posted on the Internet showed a series of waves hitting the shore and homes, sweeping away debris. Other videos show ashfall and a cloud of ash obscuring the sun. According to a resident in the Tongan capital, a series of initial smaller explosions was heard. It was followed by a tsunami approximately 15 minutes later. The first wave was said to be the largest. A long white wave was observed out at sea approaching the coast. Three waves reportedly struck the coast. In the wake of the tsunami, King Tupou VI was evacuated from the Royal Palace and traffic jams formed as locals fled inland or to higher ground. Run-ups of 3–5 m (9.8–16.4 ft) were found in the capital after a survey.

The Tongan government, on 18 January 2022, confirmed waves of up to 15 m (49 ft) struck the west coast of Tongatapu, ʻEua and Haʻapai islands. An 18 m (59 ft) wave struck Kanokupolu, on Tongatapu. Along the Hihifo Peninsula's steeper coast, the inundation distance was generally shorter than 0.2 km (0.12 mi), however, exceeded 1 km (0.62 mi) in places where the waves swept over the entire region. Waves of 10–15 m (33–49 ft), swept across Tongatapu's southwestern coast, and along east coast, were over 6 m (20 ft).

Waves measuring 10 m (33 ft) were reported on islands greater than 85 km (53 mi) away. On ʻEua, a survey of its west coast found traces of 4–8 m (13–26 ft) tsunami waves with a maximum run-up of 18 m (59 ft). On Nomuka Iki, waves with run-ups exceeding 20 m (66 ft) stripped the low-lying jungle vegetation and caused major erosion. The nearby island to the north, Nomuka, waves greater than 8 m (26 ft) struck a village. Satellite imagery, digital elevation models and synthetic aperture radar suggest tsunami runups of 45 m (148 ft) at the southern coast of Tofua. Disturbances at the coast included landslides, debris fans and flows, and transported trees at elevations of 30 m (98 ft) to 70 m (230 ft) above sea level.

Animation of the tsunami's propagation

In Fiji, a tidal gauge in Suva recorded a wave measuring 20 cm (7.9 in) at 17:40 local time. Some tsunami activity was also reported in the Lau Islands. The islands of Moce, Moala, Kadavu and Taveuni were struck by low-level tsunamis that triggered flooding.

In American Samoa, a tsunami measuring 61 cm (24 in) was recorded by tide gauges. Niue, where residents evacuated coastal areas, reported no tsunami, despite tremors and the island's close proximity to Tonga.

Tsunami waves of 1–2.5 m (3 ft 3 in – 8 ft 2 in) were observed in several islands in Vanuatu. The Vanuatu Meteorology and Geo-hazards Department said tsunami activity was expected to persist for the night of 15 January 2022. Waves up to 0.8 m (2 ft 7 in) in height were recorded in Hanalei, Hawaii.

A combination of a cyclone surge from Cyclone Cody and the tsunami caused extensive damage at a marina in Tutukaka in New Zealand. The waves pulled boats away from their moorings, taking some out into the bay and smashing some together, as well as damaging the structures at the marina. About eight to ten boats were completely sunk, with the total damage amounting to $5.93 million. According to Hauraki Gulf Weather, the tsunami struck on 16 January 2022 at between 01:05 and 01:10 local time on Great Barrier Island with a height of 1.33 m (4 ft 4 in). The tsunami caused flooding at Mahinepua Bay, where a campsite was located; all 50 individuals at the site were safe. A group of people fishing in Hokianga Harbour had to run for their lives to escape the waves, and reported having to drive through water over 1 m (3 ft 3 in) deep. Unusual waves were recorded in Port Taranaki in New Plymouth. They lasted 24 hours, with the largest having a peak-to-peak height of 1 m (3 ft 3 in) at 08:30 local time. There were no casualties reported in New Zealand.

In Australia, the Bureau of Meteorology said tsunami waves were observed throughout Saturday night on the shores along the east coast of Australia. Maximum tsunami waves of 1.27 m (4 ft 2 in) were recorded at Norfolk Island, 1.10 m (3 ft 7 in) at Lord Howe Island, 0.82 m (2 ft 8 in) at the Gold Coast, Queensland, 0.77 m (2 ft 6 in) at Twofold Bay, New South Wales, and 0.50 m (1 ft 8 in) at Hobart, Tasmania.

The signature of the tsunami was observed beneath the Ross Ice Shelf in Antarctica through an ice shelf borehole at 82.47°S. Newly installed pressure sensors recorded the atmospheric pulse and subsequent tsunami beneath 410 m (1,350 ft) of ice and snow.

=== Asia ===
In Kominato, Amami, Kagoshima, Japan, a 1.2 m (3 ft 11 in) tsunami was reported at 23:55 on 15 January JST. At Tosashimizu, Kōchi, the tsunami was 0.9 m (2 ft 11 in) in height. A tsunami measuring 0.9 m (2 ft 11 in) was also reported in Chichijima Futami. On the Tohoku coast, a 0.7 m (2 ft 4 in) wave struck at 00:38 local time, on 16 January 2022. In the Sendai Port, the tsunami measured 0.9 m (2 ft 11 in) at 00:08. In Iwate Prefecture, a 1.1 m (3 ft 7 in) tsunami was recorded at 02:26 on 16 January. The tallest tsunami was recorded 1.34 m (4 ft 5 in) at Amami Ōshima, Okinawa. Tsunami waves of less than a metre were reported along the Hokkaido Pacific coast. The JMA said that the tsunami struck 2.5 hours earlier than predicted. Small tsunami waves were observed on the coast of Taiwan. The heights of the tsunami were: 0.4 m (1 ft 4 in) at Houbi Lake in Pingtung County, followed by a 0.38 m (1 ft 3 in) wave.

On Orchid Island, Taitung County, 0.36 m (1 ft 2 in) in Yilan County, 0.31 m (1 ft 0 in) in Su'ao, and 0.29 m (11 in) at Hualien County. Waves were also observed at Chenggong with a height of 0.25 m (9.8 in), and at Kaohsiung for 0.24 m (9.4 in).

In Jeju Island, South Korea, there were fluctuations of up to 15–20 cm (5.9–7.9 in) in the sea level.

Russia's Kuril Islands, in the country's far east, had tsunami waves of about 20 cm (7.9 in). At least two ports were warned.

=== North America ===
The highest tsunami waves in the United States were 1.3 m (4 ft 3 in) in Port San Luis in San Luis Obispo County (Southern California) and 1.1 m (3 ft 7 in) in both Arena Cove and Crescent City (Northern California). Significant waves hit the Santa Cruz Harbor, and its parking lot was flooded with about 0.91 m (3 ft 0 in) of water, while Soquel Creek in the neighboring city of Capitola flowed backwards. A surfing competition was cancelled. Strong currents in Half Moon Bay were reported, while small waves were observed at Seal Beach. Waves up to 0.37 m (1 ft 3 in) in height were recorded in Nikolski, Alaska.

There was an unusually high tide along the coasts of British Columbia and Vancouver Island. At 11:55 local time, the National Tsunami Warning Center (NTWC) said tide levels rose 29 cm (11 in) in Winter Harbour. Large logs were pushed up by the high tides and deposited on the beaches.

The tsunami was first detected along the coastline of Mexico on 15 January at 12:35 by tide gauges at Michoacán. At the coasts of Guerrero, Oaxaca and Baja California Peninsula, sea level rise was reported with waves of 30 cm (12 in) to 61 cm (24 in). A tide level of 2.05 m (6 ft 9 in) was measured at Manzanillo, Colima, according to the Mareographic Service of the Institute of Geophysics of the National Autonomous University of Mexico. The tsunami had an amplitude of 1.19 m (3 ft 11 in) in Zihuatanejo. Waves of just under 1 m (3 ft 3 in) were recorded in Acapulco, Huatulco and Salina Cruz. Tsunami activity along the Pacific coast persisted until 20 January. The tsunami measured taller than 2 m (6 ft 7 in) at Ensenada, Baja California. Sea level disturbances were recorded at the coast of the Gulf of Mexico and Caribbean Sea. The shockwave-triggered meteotsunami had a maximum wave height of 0.377 m (1 ft 2.8 in).

Minor tsunamis were measured as far away as the Caribbean Sea and Texas, with National Oceanic and Atmospheric Administration reporting a maximum rise of 12 cm (4.7 in) at the Isla de Mona in Puerto Rico at 16:11 UTC. These may have been meteo-tsunamis related to slight atmospheric pressure changes.

=== South America ===
In Peru, two people were killed in Lambayeque, where the tsunami measured 2 m (6 ft 7 in). Waves measuring 0.68 m (2 ft 3 in) were recorded in the port of Callao, 0.72 m (2 ft 4 in) in Marcona District and 0.65 m (2 ft 2 in) in Paita.

Significant sea level disturbances were measured off the coast of Ecuador's La Libertad, Esmeraldas and Manta. At 02:33 local time, a 50 cm (20 in) rise in sea level was measured on the mainland. There were also sea level changes in the Galapagos Islands. Sea level disturbances off the nation's coast persisted for nearly an hour.

In northern Chile, waves of up to 2 m (6 ft 7 in) struck the coastline. Videos and images on social media from the Los Ríos Region showed the tsunami damaging piers, carrying boats and hitting beaches. A tsunami of 1.74 m (5 ft 9 in) was measured at Chañaral.

== Response ==
=== 14 January ===
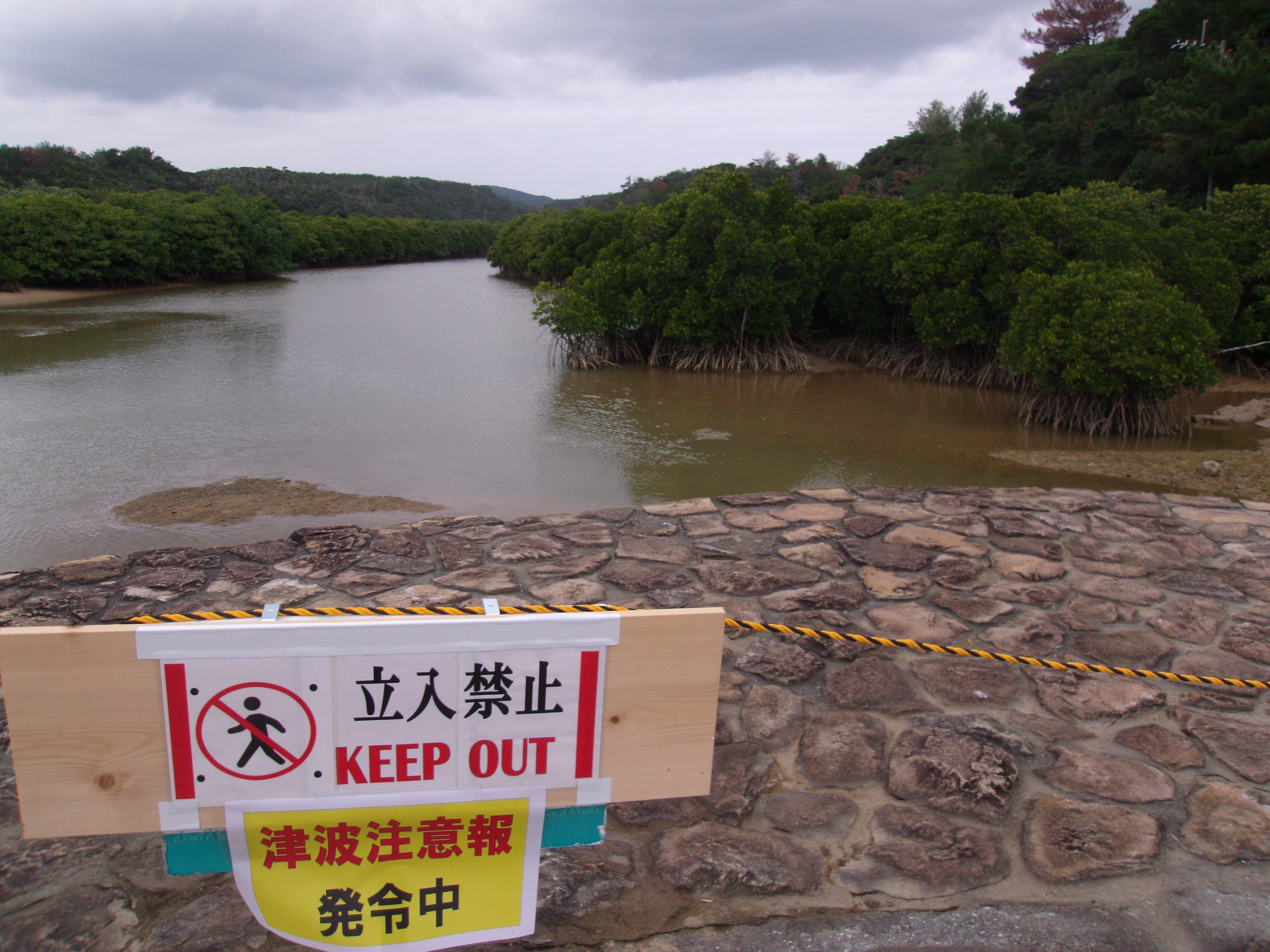
A tsunami warning signboard at Gesashi Bay Mangrove Forest, Okinawa Prefecture, Japan

A tsunami warning was issued on 14 January in Tonga after an eruption was observed. Volcanic activity decreased following that eruption and the warning was lifted in the early morning of 15 January. A 30 cm (12 in) wave was observed during the first tsunami warning.

=== 15 January ===
Another warning was issued to the whole of Tonga on the evening of 15 January following the next eruption. Warning sirens blared in Nukuʻalofa while authorities urged residents to flee to higher ground.

The Mineral Resources Department in Fiji issued advisories to people living around the coastal areas to stay away from the shores. Evacuations were made on the Lau Islands after wave activity was observed in the sea. Fiji's Attorney General Aiyaz Sayed-Khaiyum urged the public to stay indoors and cover household water tanks in the event of rain due to the risk of fallout of sulfuric acid from the SO_{_{2}} emitted in the air by the eruption. In Wallis and Futuna, a tsunami warning was issued, but no damage was reported and the alert was lifted in the evening of 15 January.

Tsunami warnings were also issued to American Samoa by the PTWC. The PTWC considered the tsunami "hazardous" and warned that changes in sea level, as well as strong currents, could pose a risk along the coast. Samoa later issued a tsunami advisory. The PTWC later cancelled the tsunami warning for American Samoa.

The National Emergency Management Agency of New Zealand told residents to expect "strong and unusual currents and unpredictable surges" along the north and east coast of North Island, as well as the Chatham Islands. The agency added that the currents have the potential to injure and drown people.

A tsunami warning was issued by the Bureau of Meteorology in Australia, with a land warning issued for Norfolk Island and Lord Howe Island, and a marine warning for the east coast of Australia, Tasmania and Macquarie Island. On 16 January, at 06:55 AEDT (15 January 2022, 19:55 UTC), tsunami marine warnings were issued to New South Wales, Queensland, Victoria and Tasmania for strong and dangerous currents.

The Japan Meteorological Agency (JMA) informed residents that a slight disturbance in the sea could occur without any damage. The tsunami would not pose a threat to the Japanese coastline. Officials from the JMA said that sea-level rise of no more than 20 cm (7.9 in) could be expected for 24 hours from 21:00 Japan Standard Time (UTC+9). A tsunami warning was issued in the Amami Islands and Tokara Islands by the JMA with forecasted waves of up to 3 m (9.8 ft). Additional warnings were issued to the east and south-east coast for waves of up to 1 m (3 ft 3 in). This was the nation's first tsunami warning since the 2016 Fukushima earthquake. A warning and evacuation order was issued to Iwate Prefecture, and evacuation orders were also issued to six other prefectures. The Fire and Disaster Management Agency (FDMA) said 229,000 residents living in eight prefectures were evacuated. Japan downgraded its warnings the following morning. Russia issued a tsunami advisory for the Kuril Islands.

The National Tsunami Warning Center issued a tsunami advisory along the West Coast of the United States and British Columbia, Canada. The advisory contained all U.S. areas along the West Coast from Southern California to Alaska. Beaches were closed, and coastal residents were requested to move to higher ground. A surfing contest with over 100 participants was cancelled in Santa Cruz, California. Tsunami waves measuring 30–61 cm (12–24 in) were expected to hit the shores as early as 07:30 Pacific Standard Time (UTC−8) along the Central Coast. San Francisco was expected to receive waves at 8:10. The highest tsunami waves are expected one to two hours after the arrival of the first waves. A tsunami advisory was put in place for the entirety of Hawaii. Advisories in Canada were issued along the North and Central coasts of British Columbia, along with the Haida Gwaii archipelago and Vancouver Island. No evacuation order was issued, but people were urged to avoid beaches and marinas. The warning level was low due to the height of reported waves, as they were below the 91 cm (36 in) threshold which would warrant an upgrade. By 12:35 local time, the tsunami advisory for British Columbia would be cancelled. By the evening, the United States lifted advisories for Alaska, Hawaii, Washington, Oregon and portions of California. They remained in effect in California in parts of the Central and North Coast until early the following day.

No warnings were issued to Peru initially. After the tsunami struck, authorities stopped all maritime activities at the coast. Twenty-two ports along north and central Peru were closed due to tsunami activity.

Chile also issued a warning for a "minor tsunami" for most of its coastal area, including the island of Rapa Nui; evacuation was declared for twelve other regions. The Hydrographic and Oceanographic Service of the Chilean Navy declared a "State of Precaution" and indicated that there is a possibility of a minor tsunami in the affected regions. Later, coastal evacuation notices were issued in 14 of the 16 regions in Chile. A "Red alert" level was issued to more than 6,400 km (4,000 mi) of its coastline. The Chilean National Office for Emergency (ONEMI) said that tsunami activity could persist overnight, so those impacted would need to hold onto their emergency supplies and aid.

Ecuador issued a warning of maritime disturbance for the Galápagos Islands.

Mexico issued tsunami warnings for the coasts of states of Baja California, Jalisco, Colima, Michoacán, Guerrero, Oaxaca and Chiapas, urging people to avoid the coasts and entering the sea.

=== Subsequent days ===
A tsunami advisory was issued to American Samoa following a new eruption at the volcano on 16 January. The advisory was cancelled almost two hours later. A tsunami alert that was issued to Fiji on 15 January was cancelled.

On 17 January, the Department of Environment in Fiji confirmed that the sulfur dioxide concentration in the atmosphere increased overnight. As previously advised, the department urged the public to cover all household water tanks and stay indoors in the event of acid rain. The Ministry of Environment also advised the public not to consume rainwater.

The first aid planes from New Zealand and Australia arrived on Tonga on 20 January, as phone lines were partially restored.

On 2 February, after receiving aid shipments, the country went into a COVID-19 lockdown, as two port workers in Nukuʻalofa tested positive.

== Impact ==
Casualties by country
Countries	Deaths	Injuries	Missing	Ref.
Tonga	4	14	Several	
Peru	2	0	0	
Fiji	1 (Note: Indirect casualties)	Several	0	
United States	0	3	0	
Japan	0	2	0	
Total	7	19+	Several	

=== Tonga ===
Effects of the eruption in Saint George's Palace

Little information was made available on the extent of damage and casualties from Tonga due to communication issues involving a damaged undersea cable. Video footage showing waves hitting coastal areas in Tonga was reported by Sky News. Atatā, a small island off the capital city, was reportedly submerged and rescue operations were being carried out. Images confirmed that most of the island have been wiped out; the New Zealand Defence Force described the damages as "catastrophic". There were some reports of residents in Tonga struggling to breathe as a result of the ash.

According to a media release by the government via a tweet, all structures were destroyed on Mango Island. Only two buildings remained intact on Fonoifua Island, and Nomuka Island suffered major damage. Twenty-one homes were destroyed and another 35 were seriously damaged on Tongatapu's west coast. Eight homes were demolished and 20 seriously damaged in Nukuʻalofa. ʻEua Island saw the loss of two homes and 45 damaged. An assessment by the United Nations Institute for Training and Research (UNITAR) revealed extensive damage on Atatā Island; at least 72 buildings were affected by the tsunami and the whole island was blanketed by ash. Early reports said Atatā Island, which is located off the main Tongan island near Nukuʻalofa, was submerged by the tsunami. A Facebook post by the Royal Sunset Island Resort on the island said all residents were accounted for and safely evacuated. On Tongatapu, 50 homes were destroyed and 100 more suffered damage.

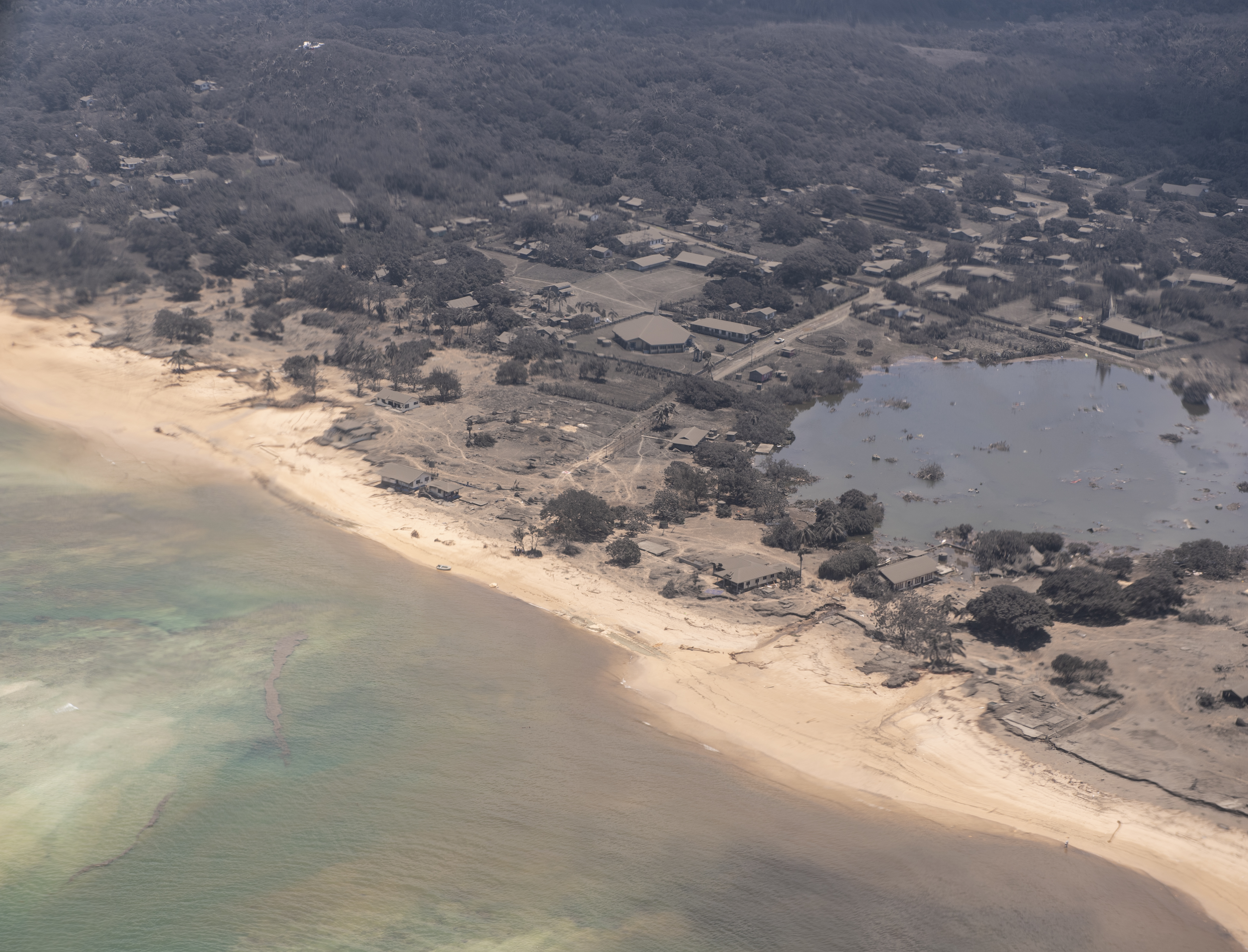
Tsunami damage along the coast of a Tongan island

A New Zealand government official in the capital Nukuʻalofa said extensive damage occurred on the waterfront of the city, as it was severely hit by the tsunami. Acting High Commissioner Peter Lund said that several people were unaccounted for following the eruption and tsunami. Tattoo parlour owner Angela Glover, a British resident in Tonga, was among the people missing, swept away by the tsunami when it hit Nukuʻalofa. Glover's body was later found. Though the extent of the damage in Tonga is still not clear, a blanket of thick ash has contaminated water supplies, cut off communications and prevented surveillance flights, making it difficult for relief efforts to begin. Another fatality was confirmed by the Ministry of Foreign Affairs and Trade on 18 January. Lund added that there was an initially unconfirmed third death from the tsunami. This third death was identified as a local resident, and the Tongan government has confirmed three deaths were the result of the tsunami. The Government of Tonga said that the two locals who died were from Mango and Nomuka islands, respectively. A fourth fatality was confirmed by 30 January, but information about this victim was not disclosed.

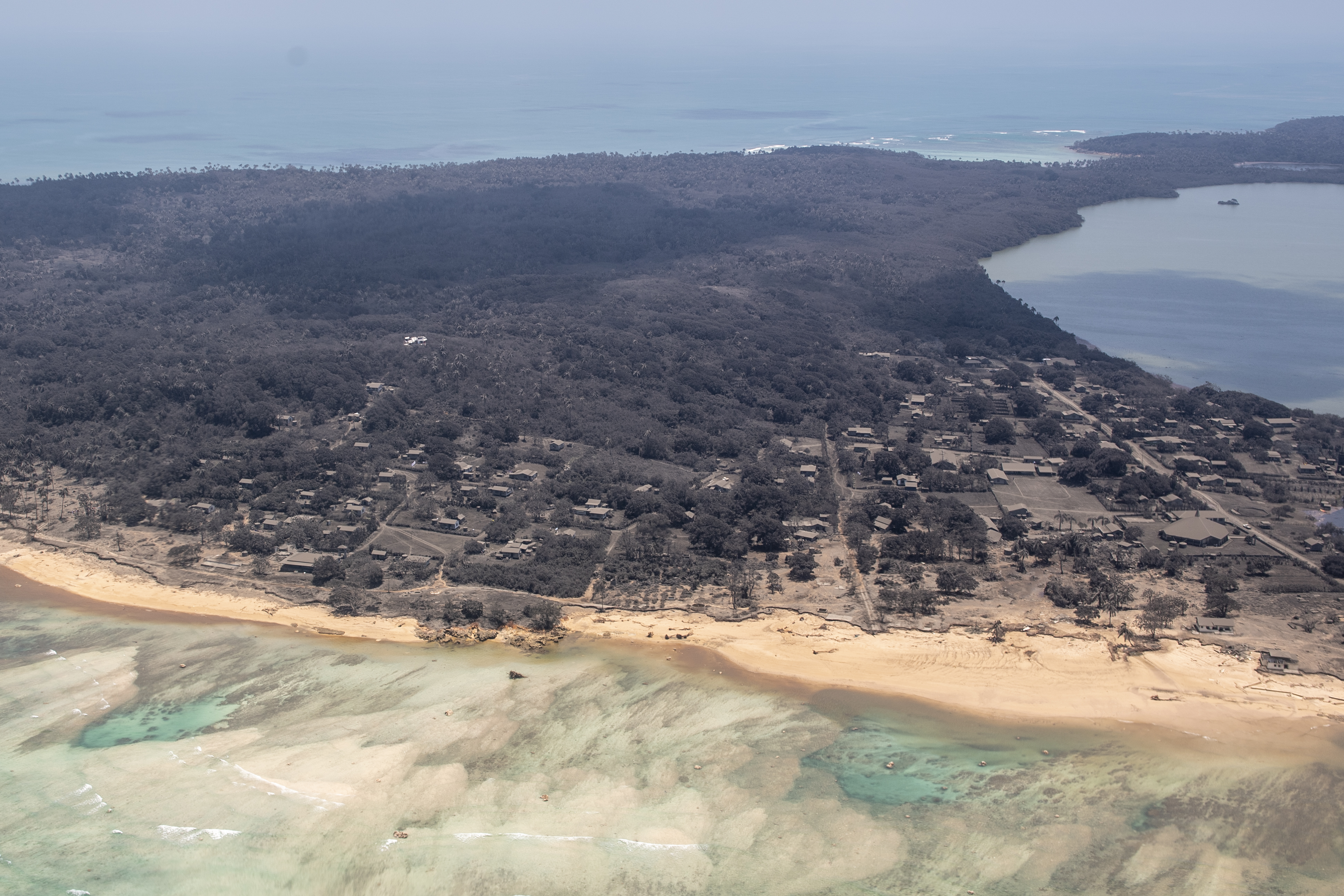
A P-3K2 Orion aircraft flies over one of the Tongan islands damaged by the tsunami

On 23 January, the Tongan government confirmed that eight people on Nomuka island were injured, with six others sustaining minor injuries.

Photos shared by a resident on the island of Lifuka, north-east of Nukuʻalofa showed minor damage to island communities and a wharf. Damage suggests the island was hit by smaller waves. The islands of ʻUiha and Haʻano also sustained limited damage from the tsunami. Several photographs showed debris left by the tsunami strewn across a road and on grass fields. Owners of the Haʻatafu Beach Resort wrote on Facebook that their beach resort, located at the northern tip of the island of Tongatapu, was completely destroyed. The employees were able to escape. They added that the whole western coastline of the island and Kanokupolu village were destroyed. The United Nations Office for the Coordination of Humanitarian Affairs stated that there was concern for two low-lying islands in the Haʻapai group, Fonoi and Mango, as a distress beacon had been detected on one of the islands (Fonoi has a population of 69 people, while Mango has 36 residents). A surveillance flight confirmed "substantial property damage" on the two low-lying islands; the Tongan government later confirmed that all homes on Mango Island were destroyed.

Southern Cross Cable reported that the eruption may have broken the Tonga Cable System, which connects Tonga to Southern Cross's trans-Pacific cable in Fiji. Southern Cross cited a fault in the international cable 37 km (23 mi) from Nukuʻalofa, and a further fault in a domestic cable 47 km (29 mi) from Nukuʻalofa. New Zealand prime minister Jacinda Ardern had earlier stated that an undersea cable serving Tonga was affected, probably due to power cuts, and authorities were urgently attempting to restore communications. The chair of the Tonga Cable System, Samiuela Fonua, stated that repair crews would not be cleared to access the site of the faults before volcanic activity ceased at Hunga Tonga; with additional preparation time necessary for the repairs, internet services could be unavailable for over two weeks after the eruption. Limited satellite connectivity was established on 21 January, mobile phone provider Digicel established a 2G cell network on Tongatapu using a satellite dish from the University of the South Pacific. Reuters reported that a specialist cable repair ship would arrive at the Tongan archipelago on 30 January. On 4 February, the Associated Press reported that Fonua stated that repair crews would need to replace 87 km (54 mi) of cable, and that he hoped to have it restored the following week. On 8 February, the Matangi Tonga website reported that more breaks were suspected within the cable, delaying the cable's restoration to 20 February. Agence France-Presse followed up in a report on 15 February, stating that the cable was torn into multiple pieces and that a 55-kilometre (34 mi) section of cable had been lost. The report also stated that separate sections of cable had been moved 5 km (3.1 mi) and buried under 30 cm (12 in) of silt. The cable being cut repeatedly and moved long distances is consistent with a turbidity current damaging it, similar to the 1929 Grand Banks earthquake. The cable connection to Tongatapu was repaired on 22 February.

Severe damage on the west coast of Tongatapu was confirmed by the New Zealand High Commission in Tonga on 17 January. Surveillance flights by the Australian Defence Forces reported extensive damage along the west coast. The shores of Nukuʻalofa had substantial damage as debris and rocks were deposited inland by the tsunami waves, according to an early report from the UN Office for the Coordination of Humanitarian Affairs (OCHA). A 2 cm (0.79 in) layer of volcanic ash blanketed the capital Nukuʻalofa.

Satellite images of Nomuka island showed that nearly a fifth of the structures had been damaged, with more than 40 buildings covered in ash. The Fuaʻamotu International Airport was covered with ash and dirt. There were also reports of water damage in the district of Nukuʻalofa. The Tongan navy that was dispatched to Haʻapai islands reported significant damage, where a tsunami estimated to be between 5–10 m (16–33 ft) in height traveled as far as 500 m (1,600 ft) inland.

The Global Facility for Disaster Reduction and Recovery reported that 600 buildings including 300 homes were damaged or destroyed by the tsunami. The Ministry of Finance estimated the agricultural damage was T$17.3 million (US$7.38 million). The World Bank revealed that 85% of the population was affected by the volcanic eruption and the subsequent tsunami. Damage was amounted to be T$421 million (US$182 million) — about 36.4% of Tonga's gross domestic product.

=== Elsewhere ===
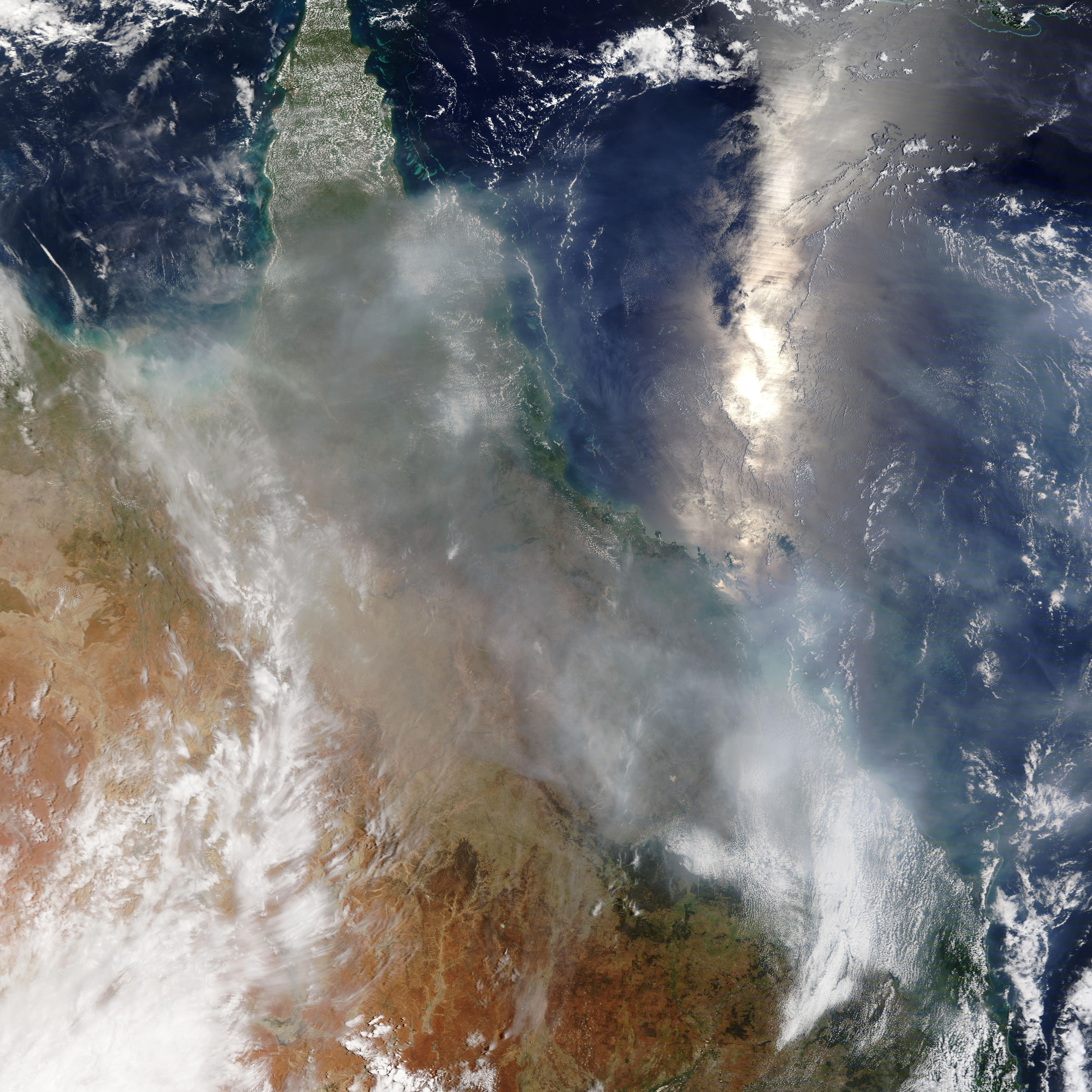
Volcanic ash from the eruption over Queensland, Australia on 17 January 2022

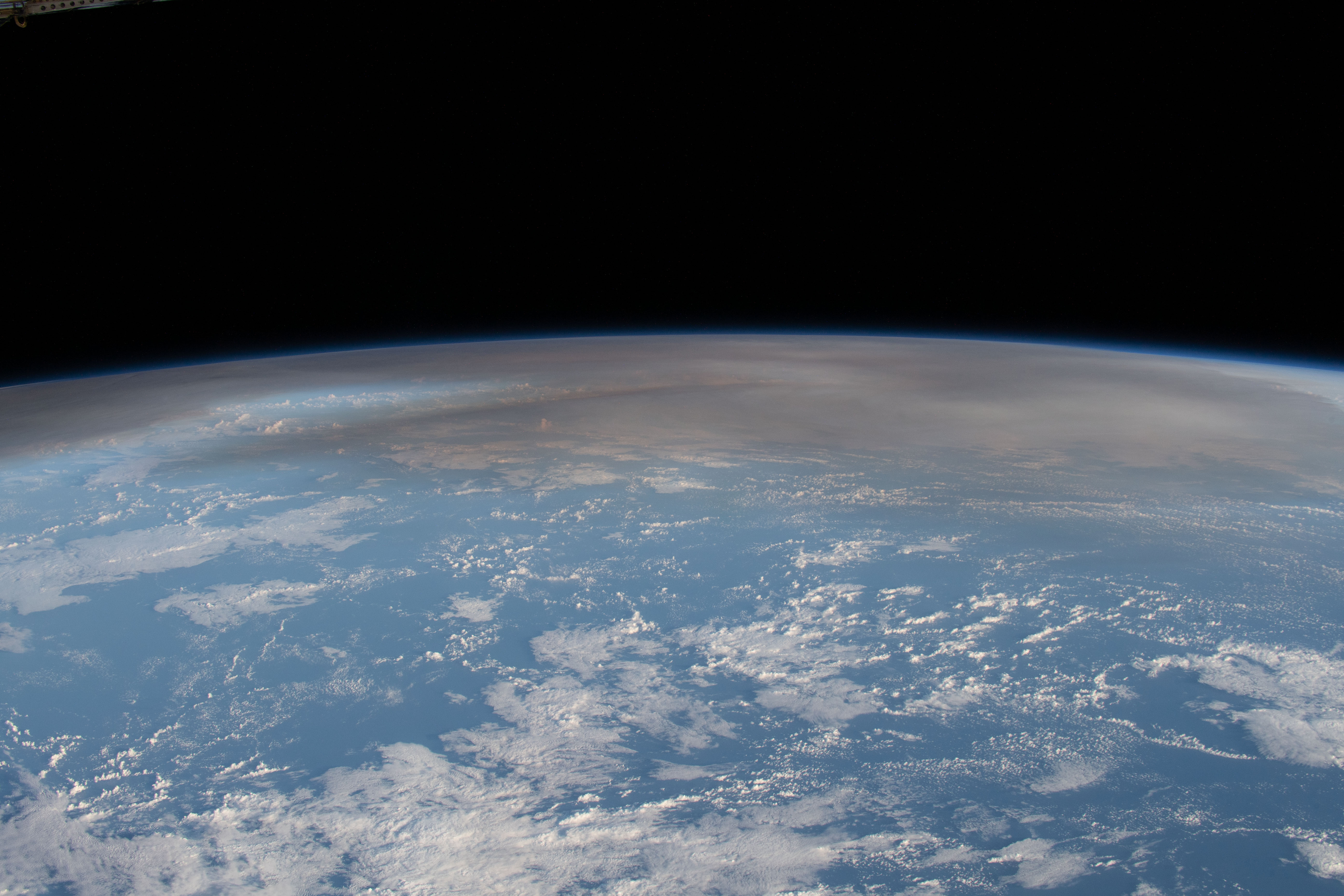
The atmospheric plume from the volcanic eruption, pictured from the International Space Station as it orbited 433 km (269 mi) above the Pacific Ocean north-west of Auckland, New Zealand

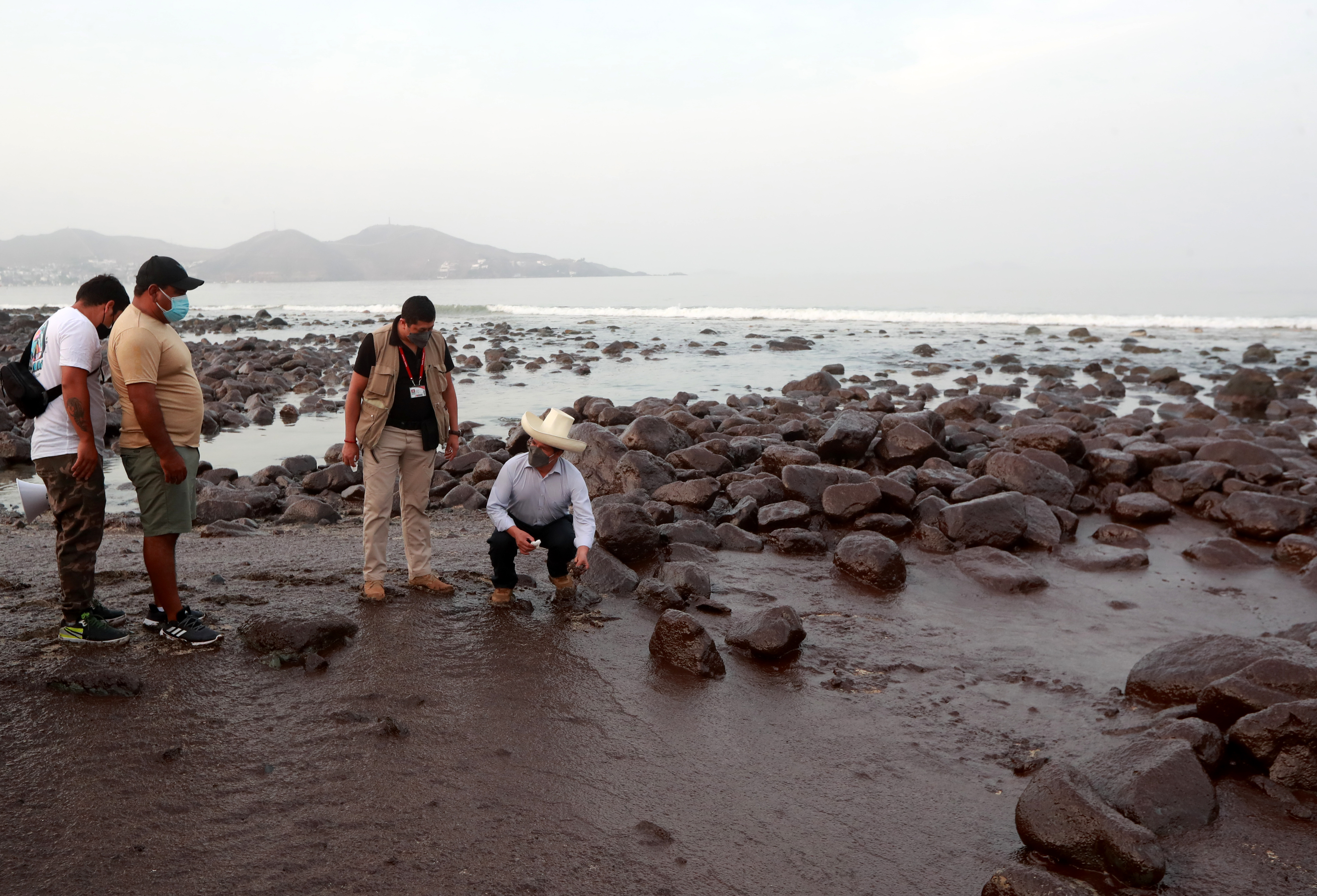
President Pedro Castillo and government officials at a beach in Peru after an oil spill caused by the tsunami

In Fiji, the eruption triggered waves in Vanua Balavu, Kadavu, Gau and Taveuni. In the village of Moce, Lau Islands, the tsunami severely damaged some homes on the beaches and debris was strewn across the village and boats were dragged inland. One elderly woman in Moce died of exhaustion while returning to a village she had evacuated during the tsunami. There was sizeable damage to schools, infrastructure as well as fishing boats in the islands.

In Japan, two people in Itoman (Okinawa) and Amami City suffered falls while evacuating. A number of fishing boats in Kōchi and Mie prefectures capsized or sank. A total of 30 fishing vessels were lost. In Muroto, five small boats sank and another five were lost. A small ship capsized and sank in Owase. The tsunami also damaged fishing nets on the coast of Tokushima Prefecture. Land, sea and air transportation was affected; 27 domestic flights operated by Japan Airlines were cancelled due to the warnings.

The tsunami caused serious material damage to a tour operator at Kailua-Kona, Hawaii, where 80 percent of its inventory and gear was lost. Major damage to retail products and the business office totaled at least US$75,000. Beaches and piers were flooded by the surging waves in the city. Canoes belonging to several clubs were damaged and strewn across the beach or on rock walls due to the waves. Boats were dumped inland or on piers after the waves retreated.

Two women in northern Peru drowned in the swell when 2 m (6 ft 7 in) waves hit Naylamp beach, Lambayeque, dragging a truck into the sea. The driver escaped. Twenty-two ports along northern and central Peru were closed due to the tsunami. Substantial material damage was inflicted on coastal businesses and the beach areas. Videos showed the tsunami flooding the streets. Restaurants and boats in Lagunillas beach and San Andrés District were damaged by waves. Many beachgoers were evacuated to safety while businesses closed. Damage to piers and some homes occurred in the capital, Lima. In some areas, boat owners dragged their boats onto shore to prevent the waves from damaging them. The Peruvian Civil Defense Institute said on 17 January that an oil spill occurred at the La Pampilla refinery. The spill was caused by tsunami waves moving a ship while transporting oil onto the refinery. The oil spill affected some 1,187 km^{2} (458 sq mi) of sea and 1,740 km^{2} (670 sq mi) of beach-coastal strip, and more than 500 ha (1,200 acres) of protected natural areas in Peru.

Despite the warnings from officials, some residents in California strayed too close to the sea, and they were swept away by strong surges, such as the situation at San Gregorio, California, where four fishermen were swept out to sea by the tsunami. Two men were injured and received medical treatment, while another two were rescued unhurt. A woman was rescued and treated by medical workers at China Beach, San Francisco. San Francisco firefighters and the U.S. Coast Guard rescued three surfers. The tsunami caused extensive damage at Santa Cruz harbor in Santa Cruz, California. Electrical systems, pilings, restrooms and showers were damaged and repair costs were estimated at US$6.5 million.

Minor material damage occurred on the coast of Penco, and six people were trapped in Coliumo (near Tomé), in Chile's Biobío Region. No casualties were reported due to the evacuations. A State of Precaution was still in place in Atacama, Coquimbo, Ñuble and Biobío as of 16 January 2022.

Flights to Tonga and in the surrounding region were disrupted by lingering volcanic ash. Air New Zealand stated that a repatriation flight to Tonga that was originally scheduled for 20 January was postponed indefinitely, and Fiji Airways announced that all flights to Tonga were postponed and several services to Australia could face delays and longer flight times. An Aircalin flight from Tokyo to Nouméa was diverted to Brisbane to avoid volcanic ash, with a subsequent flight from Nouméa to Sydney placed on hold. The ash cloud reached Queensland on 17 January, creating an "eerie, spectacular and incredible" sunrise. In July, it reached Antarctica, causing "stunning" pink and purple skyscapes.

== Assistance ==
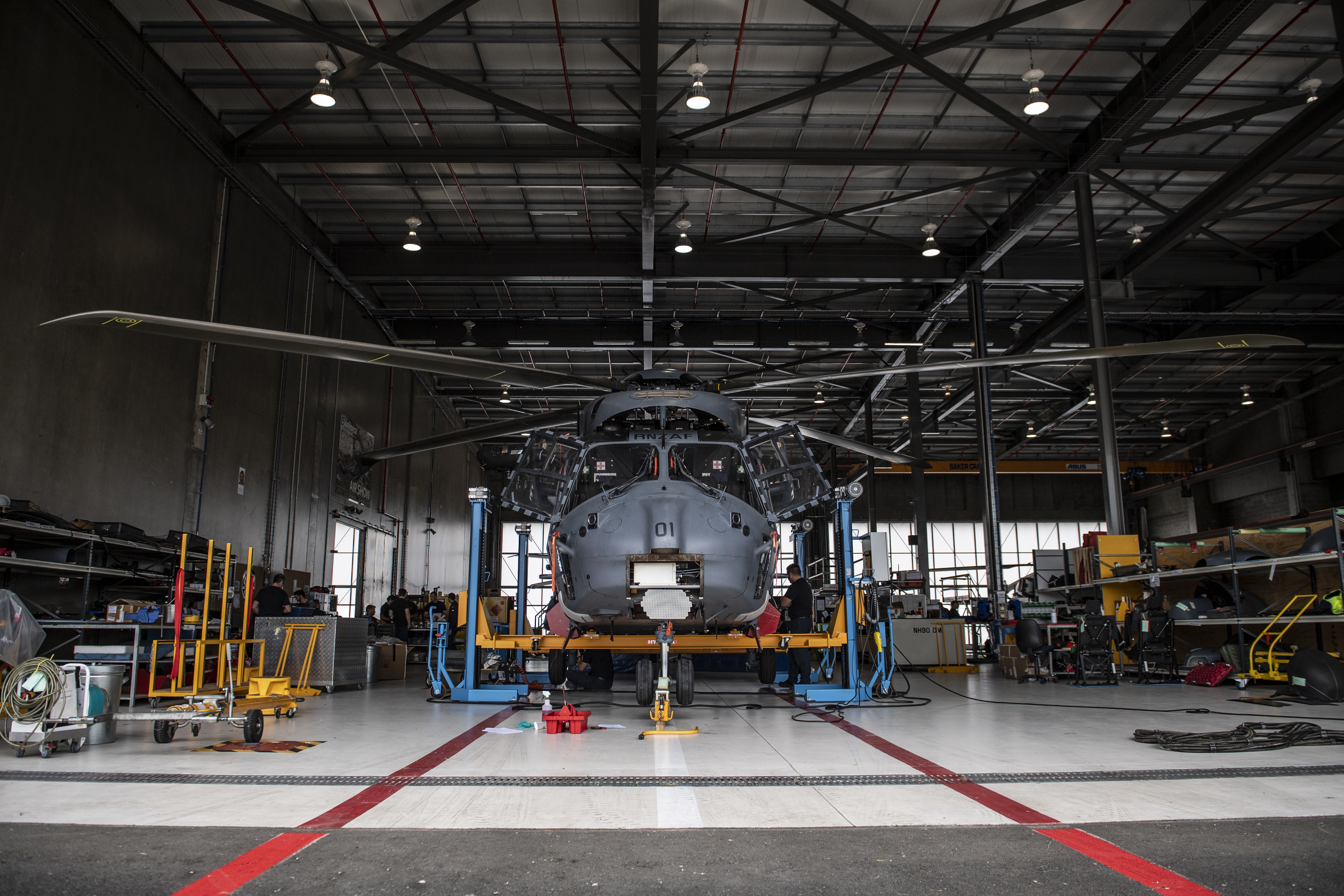
RNZAF 3SQN maintenance teams prepare two NH90 helicopters for long-term operations to assist Tonga.

New Zealand's prime minister Jacinda Ardern said officials from the Ministry of Foreign Affairs were discussing the provision of aid to Tonga. Ardern described the events in Tonga as "hugely concerning". On 16 January, she announced New Zealand was donating NZ$500,000, which was "very much the starting point". The Royal New Zealand Navy was preparing to sail and a RNZAF P-3 Orion would be sent on a reconnaissance flight as soon as it was safe to do so. The ash cloud was estimated at 19,000 m (62,000 ft) high, well above the Orion's service ceiling. The C-130H Hercules airlift is ready to serve as well. Following reports of no continued ashfall in Tonga, the P-3 Orion left RNZAF Base Auckland for Tonga on the morning of 17 January. On 18 January, as an RNZAF Lockheed C-130 Hercules was unable to land following continued ashfall in Tonga, two Royal New Zealand Navy ships set sail for Tonga. HMNZS Wellington carried survey equipment and a helicopter, while HMNZS Aotearoa carried 250,000 L (55,000 imp gal; 66,000 US gal) of water and desalination equipment to produce a further 70,000 L (15,000 imp gal; 18,000 US gal) per day. On 20 January, New Zealand announced that it would dispatch a third warship, HMNZS Canterbury with two NH90 helicopters to assist with relief efforts.

Tonga accepted an offer by the Australian government of a surveillance flight to assess the damage. Two Boeing P-8A Poseidon maritime patrol aircraft and a Lockheed C-130J Hercules of the Royal Australian Air Force departed on the morning of 17 January 2022 for Tonga to survey damage to roadways, ports and power lines. The Australian and New Zealand governments also announced they were coordinating their humanitarian response with France and the United States. Assistance from France is provided through the humanitarian aid mechanism of the FRANZ agreement with Australia and New Zealand. Australia would later announce that HMAS Adelaide would be deployed to Tonga with water purification and humanitarian supplies. The United States dispatched USS Sampson as well as a Coast Guard vessel while the United Kingdom deployed HMS Spey. After 23 crew members of the Adelaide tested positive for COVID-19 while en route to Tonga, the ship made a contactless delivery.

On 17 January, officials in Tonga called for immediate aid. Speaker of the Legislative Assembly of Tonga Fatafehi Fakafanua in a social media post wrote that "Tonga needs immediate assistance to provide its citizens with fresh drinking water and food". The International Red Cross and Red Crescent Movement and the Pacific Islands Forum has offered its assistance. Tearfund and Oxfam provided immediate assistance by supporting people with food and water. Oxfam already had filtering units in Tongatapu which could turn salt water into drinking water. UNICEF will work with the Tongan government to reach affected children and families. The agency was also ready to transport its emergency supplies from Fiji and Brisbane.

Fiji's Attorney General and Acting Prime Minister Aiyaz Sayed-Khaiyum said that Fiji was working with New Zealand and Australia to coordinate regional relief efforts. He added that Fiji had offered to dispatch Republic of Fiji Military Forces (RFMF) personnel and engineers that would join the Australian Defence Force (ADF). Relief supplies would also be sent to the Lau group that was affected by the tsunami. On 29 January, a chartered commercial vessel was deployed to Tonga. Aboard the vessel were eleven shipping containers filled with relief supplies. Four containers were from the Tongan Community in Fiji while the rest were from donations by government and non-government organisations.

The International Federation of Red Cross and Red Crescent Societies (IFRC) Asia Pacific said that drinking water were hurriedly distributed to people in need due to the tsunami and ash affecting local water supply. The Tonga Red Cross provided temporary shelters and supplied water to affected communities. Emergency response teams were sent to Mango, Fonoifua and Namuka islands.

=== International ===
- China: On 17 January, the Red Cross Society of China decided to provide US$100,000 of emergency humanitarian aid in cash to the Tongan side, while the government of China said it would deliver a batch of disaster relief materials to Tonga at the request of the South Pacific island country. On 19 January, the Chinese government delivered a batch of emergency supplies such as drinking water and food to Tonga through the embassy in Tonga. The Chinese Embassy in Fiji raised another batch of RMB 1 million materials to deliver to Tonga. On 27 and 31 January, the Chinese army dispatched air force transport aircraft Y-20 and naval ships to Tonga to deliver emergency and post-disaster reconstruction materials such as water purifiers, tents, personal protective equipment, generators, water pumps, tractors and radio communication equipment in two batches. The two batches of materials were 33 tons and more than 1,400 tons, respectively. They arrived on 28 January and 15 February local time, respectively.
- Israel: Israeli Foreign Minister Yair Lapid stated that Israel was exploring ways of providing aid to Tonga through its aid agency Mashav including access to safe drinking water.
- Singapore: On 18 January, the Singapore Red Cross Society pledged S$50,000 in aid to Tonga and also announced a fundraising effort to raise more help for those affected by the tsunami.
- Japan: On 20 January, the Japanese government dispatched two C-130H via Australia to Tonga. Subsequently, the Japanese Ministry of Defense decided to send JS Ōsumi with 60,000 L (13,000 imp gal; 16,000 US gal) of drinking water, high-pressure cleaning devices for removing volcanic ash, and two CH-47J onboard. The Ministry had also deployed its C-2 transport aircraft loaded with additional relief supplies. The Japanese Government has also planned to offer more than ¥114 million (US$1 million) in funds for Tonga.
- European Union: On 22 January, the EU has allocated €200,000 in emergency humanitarian aid funding. This fund was directed to the Tonga Red Cross Society, with the specific aim of assisting the most severely affected communities. Via the EU Civil Protection Mechanism, the EU coordinate with France the delivery of humanitarian aid, while the European Commission coordinated the delivery and financed 75% of the transporting costs.
- India: On 25 January, the Indian Government provided an immediate relief assistance of US$200,000 "to support relief, rehabilitation and reconstruction efforts" in Tonga, which it described as "a close friend and partner under the Forum for India-Pacific Islands Cooperation (FIPIC)."
- United States: On 25 January, the U.S. Government announced $2.5 million of humanitarian assistance, to be delivered through its USAID development agency in cooperation with the International Federation of Red Cross and Red Crescent Societies and the Tonga Red Cross Society.

=== Non-state interventions ===
On 6 February, The New Zealand Herald and the Fiji Broadcasting Corporation's FBC News reported that SpaceX engineers were working to restore Internet access in Tonga. New Zealand National Party Member of Parliament Shane Reti had earlier petitioned SpaceX CEO Elon Musk for assistance in providing Starlink satellite technology to the island country. In response, Musk had asked on Twitter whether Tonga authorities could inform him on whether Starlink terminals were needed. The Fijian Minister for Communications Aiyaz Sayed-Khaiyum subsequently confirmed that SpaceX engineers would establish and operate a temporary ground station in Fiji to assist with efforts to restore Internet access in Tonga.

By 23 February, Tonga Cable had managed to restore Tonga's fibre-optic cable with the assistance of SpaceX. On 21 February, repair works on the Southern Cross Cable were completed, restoring Internet to Tonga.

Tongan Olympian flagbearer Pita Taufatofua, who became widely known during the 2016 Summer Olympics, gathered more than US$330,000 in aid to his native country, after he opened a GoFundMe fundraising website.

== See also ==
- List of volcanic eruptions in the 21st century
- 1808 mystery eruption – possibly an earlier eruption in Tonga
- 1991 Pinatubo eruption
- 2009 Samoa earthquake and tsunami
- 2009 Tonga undersea volcanic eruption
- List of earthquakes in Tonga
- Tonga Trench
