= Muifuiva =

Island in Haʻapai, Tonga

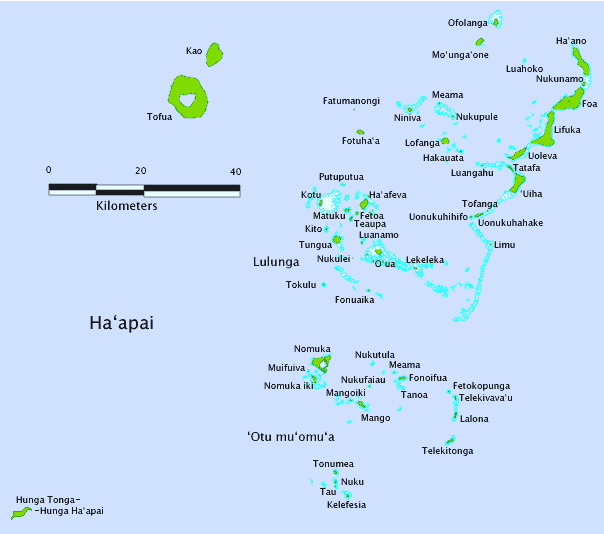
- Interactive map of Muifuiva

Geography
- Location: South Pacific
- Coordinates: 20.267°S 174.817°W
- Archipelago: Haʻapai
- Highest elevation: 27 m (89 ft)

Administration
- Tonga
- Division: Haʻapai

Muifuiva is a tiny island in the Haʻapai archipelago, that is a part of the Kingdom of Tonga. The island name in local language means "tail of the fuiva bird".

== Geography ==
The island lies in the center of ʻOtu Muʻomuʻa along with the larger islands of Nomuka, Nomuka iki, and Nukufaiau.

== Climate ==
The climate is tropical but moderated by constantly blowing winds. Like the other islands in the Ha'apai group, Muifuiva is occasionally hit by cyclones.
