= Masilamea =

Village in Tonga

Coordinates: 21°07′27″S 175°19′32″W

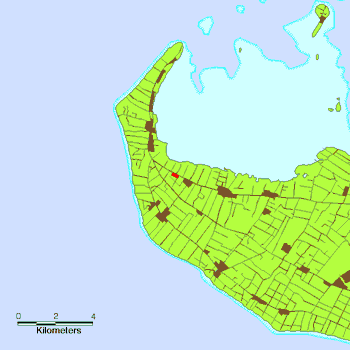
Masilamaea (in red)

Masilamea is a village on the island of Tongatapu in Tonga. The village had a population of 284 at the 2021 census.

== History ==
In September 2022 the Tongan government began construction of new homes in the village for displaced survivors of the Hunga Tonga–Hunga Haʻapai eruption and tsunami. In December 2022, displaced citizens of the island of Atatā were permanently resettled near the village.
