= Kelefesia =

Island in Tonga

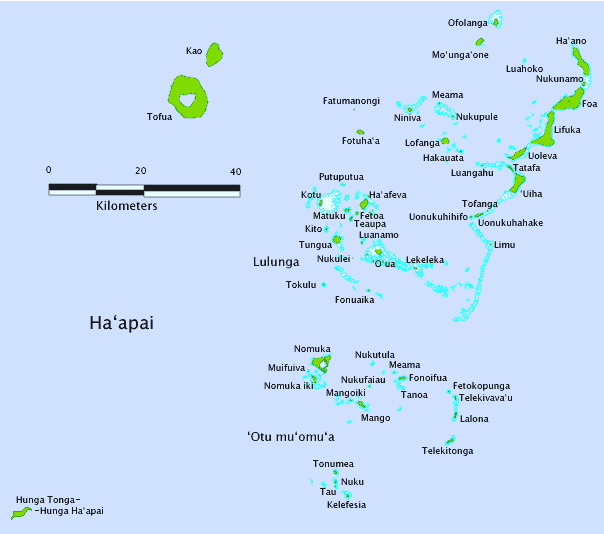
- Kelefesia is the southernmost island
- Interactive map of Kelefesia

Geography
- Location: South Pacific
- Coordinates: 20.502°S 174.735°W
- Archipelago: Haʻapai, Nomuka island group

Administration
- Tonga
- Division: Haʻapai

Kelefesia (also: Falafagea, Fallafajea, Kelifijia) is an island in the Haʻapai Archipelago, that belongs to the Kingdom of Tonga. Among neighboring islands are Nukutula, Nomuka, Tonumea, Fonoifua, Telekitonga, Fetokopunga, Nukufaiau. The island is privately owned (it was historically granted to a Tongan family), and no one lives there permanently.

== Geography ==
The island is located in the south of Muʻomuʻa district and is the southernmost island of the Nomuka islands group. Together with Hunga Tonga, it is also the southernmost island of the Haʻapai group at the transition to Tongatapu. The island has about the shape of a hatchet leaf and is surrounded by diverse coral reefs. The island area is 32 acres.

== Climate ==
The climate is tropical, but it is tempered by constantly blowing winds. Like the other islands of the Ha'apai group, Kelefesia is occasionally hit by cyclones.
