= Tonga Cable System =

Submarine cable system connecting Tonga with Fiji

- Founded: Construction began 2012
- Area served: Tonga & Fiji
- Owner: Tonga Cable Limited (TCL)
- Website: tongacable.to

Tonga Cable System is a submarine fiber-optic cable system connecting Tonga with Fiji, where it connects to other international networks. It is 827 kilometres (514 mi) long and was activated in 2013. It has cable landing points at Sopu, a suburb of Nukuʻalofa in Tonga, and Suva, Fiji. The project was funded by Asian Development Bank and the World Bank.

An extension of the cable to Haʻapai and Vavaʻu was commissioned in April 2018.

== History ==
On 20 January 2019, the cable broke and disrupted Internet services to Tonga. Satellite communications were used as a backup.

Three years later, the 2022 Hunga Tonga–Hunga Ha'apai eruption disrupted it again. A specialist repair ship from SubCom could take days to get to the fault site, as it was deployed from Port Moresby in Papua New Guinea. It was expected to take at least two weeks to repair the system, assuming no new eruption affected the zone. Repair of the cable to Nukuʻalofa, of which 55 kilometres (34 mi) had disappeared, presumed buried by an underwater avalanche, was completed on 21 February, with testing and recommissioning expected within 24 hours. The extension from Nukuʻalofa to Haʻapai and Vavaʻu remained damaged.
