= ʻAtatā =

Island in Tonga

Coordinates: 21.050°S 175.251°W

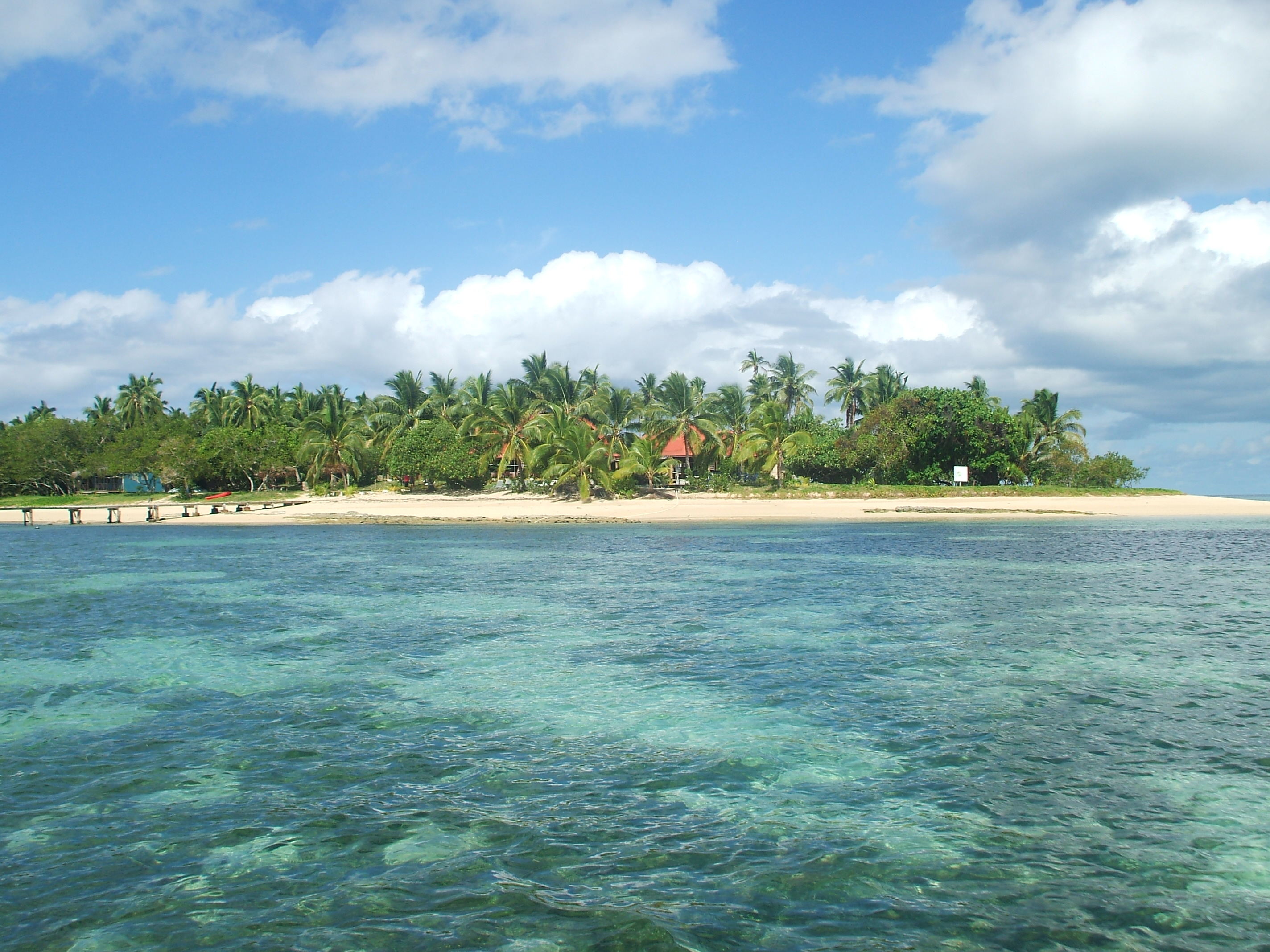
Royal Sunset Island Resort at ʻAtata Island, pictured in 2012.

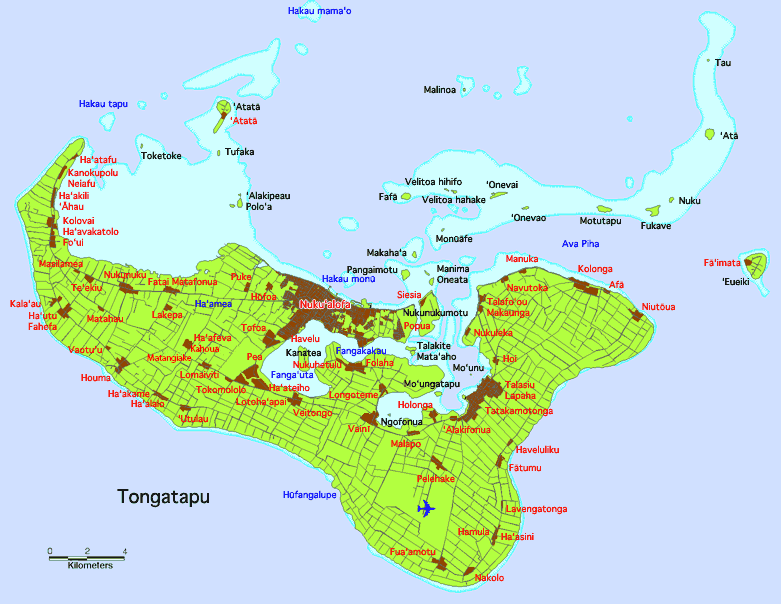
ʻAtatā is located near the north west coast of Tongatapu, the main island of Tonga.

ʻAtatā is an island in Tonga, near the capital city Nukuʻalofa. The island was completely evacuated after the 2022 Hunga Tonga–Hunga Ha'apai eruption and tsunami. Before the eruption, the island's population was 106.

== History ==
The island was partially submerged in the 2022 Hunga Tonga–Hunga Haʻapai eruption and tsunami. Images from the New Zealand Defence Force showed the island suffered "catastrophic" damage with trees uprooted and a large number of buildings missing. The aerial footage appeared to show the island "wiped out" by the disaster. The only building that survived was reportedly the island's chapel of the Church of Jesus Christ of Latter-day Saints, which was used by villagers for shelter. One local, Lisala Folau, survived 27 hours at sea by holding onto a floating log.

The island was completely evacuated following the eruption and its population transferred to Tongatapu. In December 2022 they were permanently resettled near the village of Masilamea.
