= Tonumea =

Island in Tonga

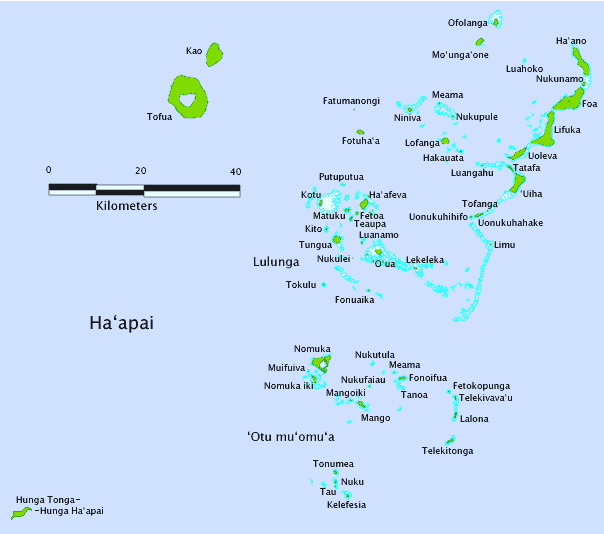
- Interactive map of Tonumea

Geography
- Location: South Pacific
- Coordinates: 20.458°S 174.760°W
- Archipelago: Haʻapai
- Highest elevation: 27 m (89 ft)

Administration
- Tonga
- Division: Haʻapai

Tonumea (also: Tanumea, Tonomaia, Tonumeia) is an island in the Haʻapai archipelago that belongs to the Kingdom of Tonga. Among neighboring islands are Telekitonga, Nukutula, Kelefesia, Nomuka, Telekitonga, Nukufaiau, Fetokopunga, Fonoifua.

== Geography ==
The island lies to the south of ʻOtu Muʻomuʻa as the northernmost island of the Nuku Islands group; to the south lies Nuku. Mango is the closest island to the north. The maximum height of the island is 27 meters.

== Climate ==
The climate is tropical, but moderated by constantly blowing winds. Like the other islands in the Ha'apai group, Tonumea is occasionally hit by cyclones.
