= 2022 Callao oil spill =

January 2022 oil spill in Peru

2022 Callao Oil spill
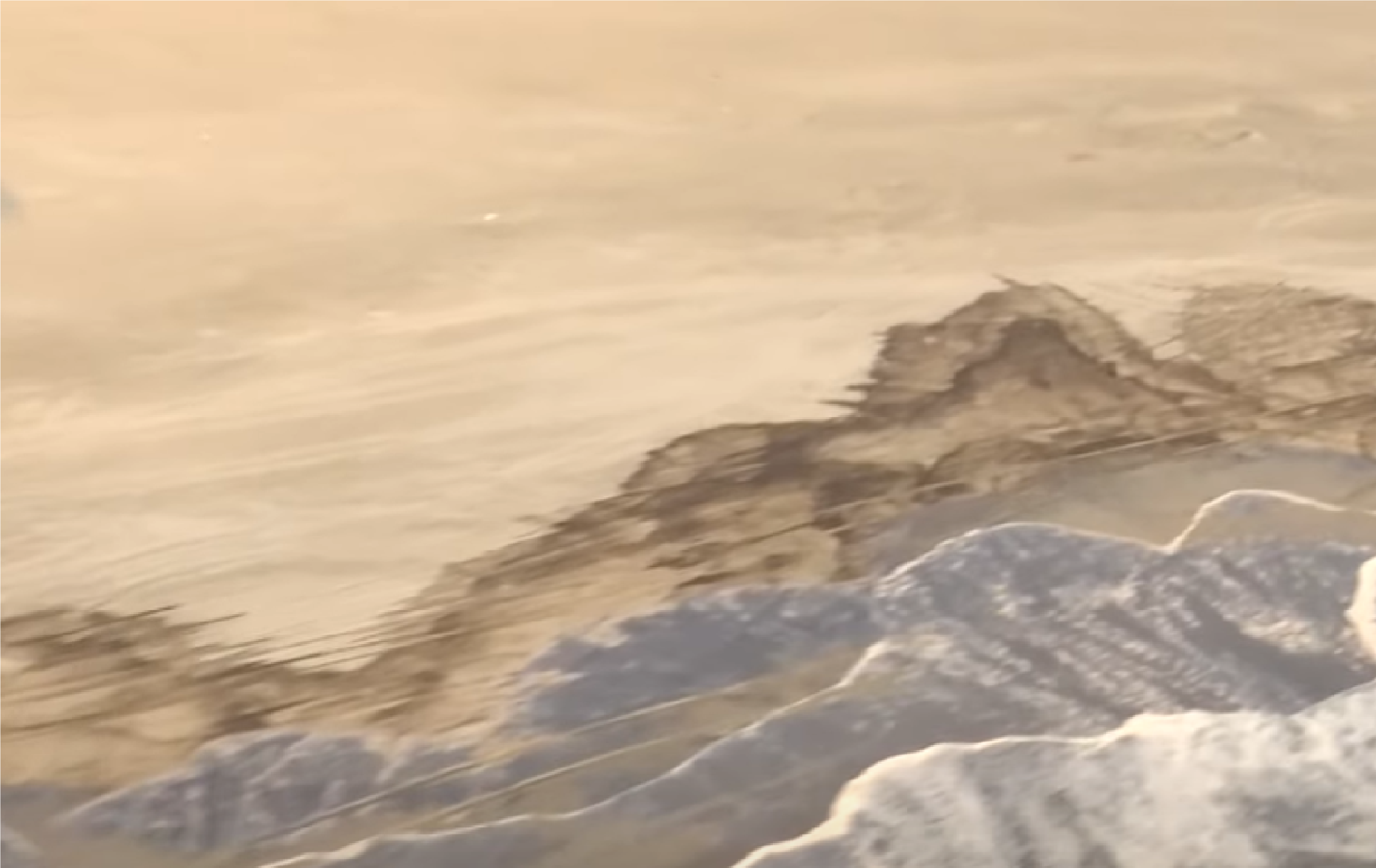
- Aerial view of the oil spill on the coast of Callao
- Date: 15 January 2022
- Location: Ventanilla District, Callao, Peru; 11°55′14.9″S 77°8′33.4″W
- Type: Oil spill
- Cause: 2022 Hunga Tonga–Hunga Ha'apai eruption and tsunami
- Accused: Repsol

The 2022 Callao oil spill is a crude oil spill that occurred on 15 January 2022, on the coast of the Ventanilla district in the constitutional province of Callao, Peru, after abnormal waves caused by the volcanic eruption in Tonga and alleged negligence on the side of company Repsol. It has been qualified by the Environmental Assessment and Control Agency as the greatest ecological disaster that has occurred in Peru.

== Facts ==
The spill began in the early morning of 15 January 2022 during the process of unloading crude oil at the La Pampilla refinery of the Spanish company Repsol in Callao. Initially, Repsol indicated that only 7 gallons of crude oil had been spilled, but in the morning it was found that the magnitude of the disaster was vastly greater, calculating 6,000 barrels dumped into the sea.

According to the Agency for Environmental Assessment and Enforcement (OEFA), the oil spill affects some 1,187 km^{2} (458 sq mi) of sea and 1,740 km^{2} (670 sq mi) of beach-coastal strip, about 17 beaches have been affected from the La Pampilla refinery to Peralvillo beach in Chancay and more than 500 ha (1,200 acres) of the protected natural areas of the National Reserve System of Guaneras Islands, Islets and Points and the Reserved Zone of Ancón.

Peru's Environment Minister, Rubén Ramírez Mateo, stated that the oil company did not immediately report the accident to the Peruvian government, and that the fine could amount to 138 million soles, about 35 million dollars.

President Pedro Castillo flew over the area affected by the oil spill

== Government response ==
On Wednesday, 19 January, the President of the Republic, Pedro Castillo, flew over the areas affected by the oil spill. The following day, he signed a supreme decree declaring the climate emergency of national interest. The Peruvian Prosecutor's Office opened an investigation for environmental contamination against the La Pampilla Refinery. For its part, Repsol defends that neither the Peruvian government nor the Navy issued tsunami alerts on the Peruvian coast, so its operations were not suspended.
