= Telekitonga =

Island in Tonga

Tonumea
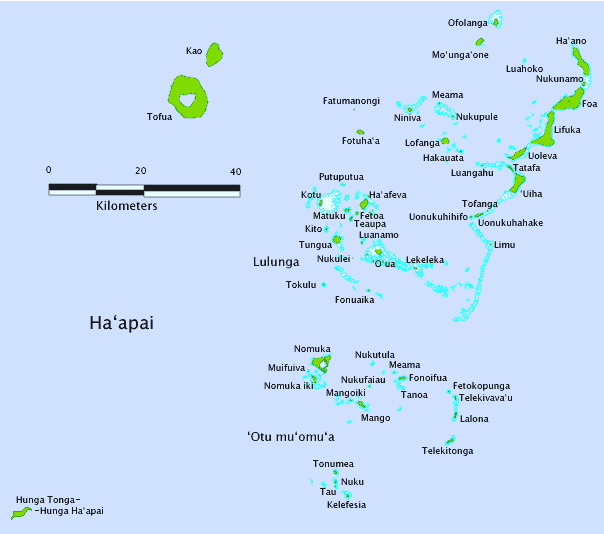
- Interactive map of Tonumea

Geography
- Location: South Pacific
- Coordinates: 20.395°S 174.529°W
- Archipelago: Haʻapai
- Highest elevation: 27 m (89 ft)

Administration
- Tonga
- Division: Haʻapai

Telekitonga (also: Telekitinga, Tele-ki-Tongs, Teleki Toga) is an island in the Haʻapai archipelago that belongs to the Kingdom of Tonga. Among neighboring islands are Nukutula, Fetokopunga, Kelefesia, Nomuka, Tonumea, Fonoifua.

== Geography ==
The island lies to the east of ʻOtu Muʻomuʻa and is the northernmost tip of the ʻOtu Tolu Group, whose islands of Telekivavaʻu, Nukutavake, Telekihaʻapai, and Fetokopunga stretch from north to south.

Telekitonga is one of the eastern barrier islands, lying 15 miles northeast of Kelefesia and 60 miles north of Tongatapu. The island is low-lying and surrounded by reefs.

== Climate ==
The climate is tropical, but moderated by constantly blowing winds. Like the other islands in the Ha'apai group, Telekitonga is occasionally hit by cyclones.
