= Tonga Red Cross Society =

Organization based in Tonga

- Founded: 1961
- Type: Non-profit organisation
- Purpose: Humanitarian Aid
- Location: Tonga
- Affiliations: International Committee of the Red Cross; International Federation of Red Cross and Red Crescent Societies
- Website: tongaredcross.org

Tonga Red Cross Society (TRCS) was established in 1961 and it has its headquarters in Nukuʻalofa.
