= Kanokupolu =

Village in Tongatapu, Tonga

Coordinates: 21°05′S 175°20′W

Kanokupolu is a village on Tongatapu. The population is 354. it is the originating seat (in the beginning of the 17th century) of the Tuʻi Kanokupolu dynasty, to which the current king of Tonga still traces his descent. The people of Kanokupolu are the only ones allowed to dress in a particular lakalaka costume, called the folaʻosi, when they perform this dance.

== History ==
The village's name means "the flesh (the essence) of ʻUpolu" (Samoa). The name was given when Samoans led by Ngata, son of Tohuia, a Samoan Taupou, who was daughter of war chief ‘Ama, migrated to Tonga from Safata, Upolu after a heavy defeat in battle at the hands of the combined forces of Atua and A’ana. The expedition is believed to be the last great exodus of peoples from Samoa and, having arrived in the area now known as Kanokupolu, Ngata eventually rose to become Tu’i Kanokupolu and ruler over all of Tonga. The Title Tuikanokupolu is named “Heart of Upolu” in honor of Ngatas Samoan Mothers Heritage.

81 houses in the village were destroyed by Cyclone Isaac in 1982.
