= Fritz Island (Pennsylvania) =

Coordinates: 40°18′02″N 75°55′09″W

Fritz Island is an island that is located in the Schuylkill River downstream of central Reading, Pennsylvania in the southeast extremity of that city. Reading's Fritz Island sewer facility is located on the island.

Before it was called Fritz Island, it was called Mifflin Island and there were mining operations on the island.
