= Nukutula =

Island in Tonga

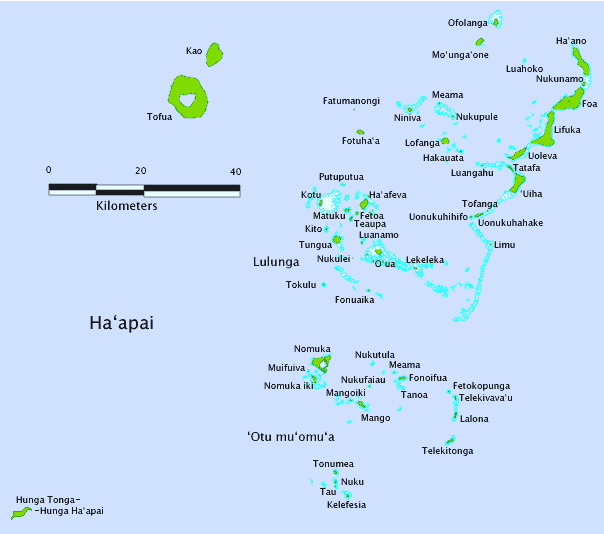
- Kelefesia is the southernmost island
- Interactive map of Nukutula

Geography
- Location: South Pacific
- Coordinates: 20.251°S 174.689°W
- Archipelago: Haʻapai, Nomuka island group
- Highest elevation: 5 m (16 ft)

Administration
- Tonga
- Division: Haʻapai

Nukutula is an island in the Haʻapai Archipelago, belonging to the Kingdom of Tonga. Among neighboring islands are Telekitonga, Kelefesia, Nomuka, Tonumea, Fonoifua.

== Geography ==
Nukutula is a wooded sand cay, 18 feet high, lying on a reef about 2 miles northward of Nukufaiau. The island lies in the center of ʻOtu Muʻomuʻa along with Nukufaiau. To the east are the islands of Fonoifua, Tanoa, and Meama with the reefs of Mai Reef and Lua Anga, and to the west is the main island of Nomuka.

== Climate ==
The climate is tropical, but moderated by constantly blowing winds. Like the other islands in the Ha'apai group, Nukutula is occasionally hit by cyclones.
