= Fonoifua =

Island in Tonga

Coordinates: 20°16′43″S 174°37′47″W

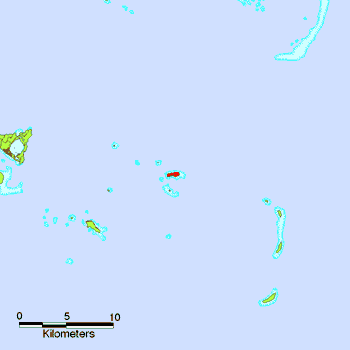
Fonoifua in the Tonga Archipelago

Fonoifua is an island in Tonga. Among neighbouring islands are Kelefesia, Nukutula, Tonumea, Nomuka, Telekitonga.

== History ==
Fonoifua was heavily affected by the 2022 Hunga Tonga–Hunga Ha'apai eruption and tsunami. The Guardian and ITV News reported that all structures on the island were destroyed except for two houses.

== Demographics ==
At the 2021 census the island had 69 inhabitants.
