= Nomuka =

Island in Tonga

Coordinates: 20°15′S 174°48′W

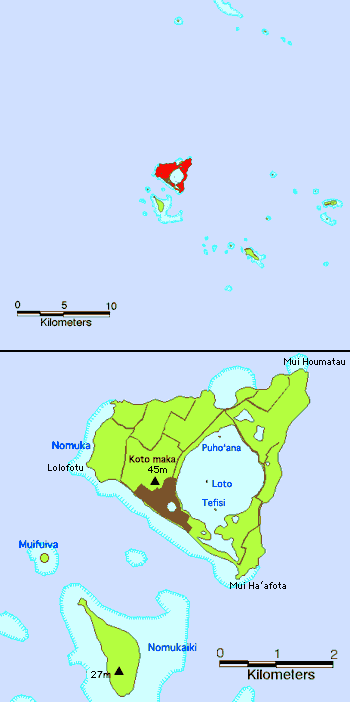
Map of Nomuka Islands

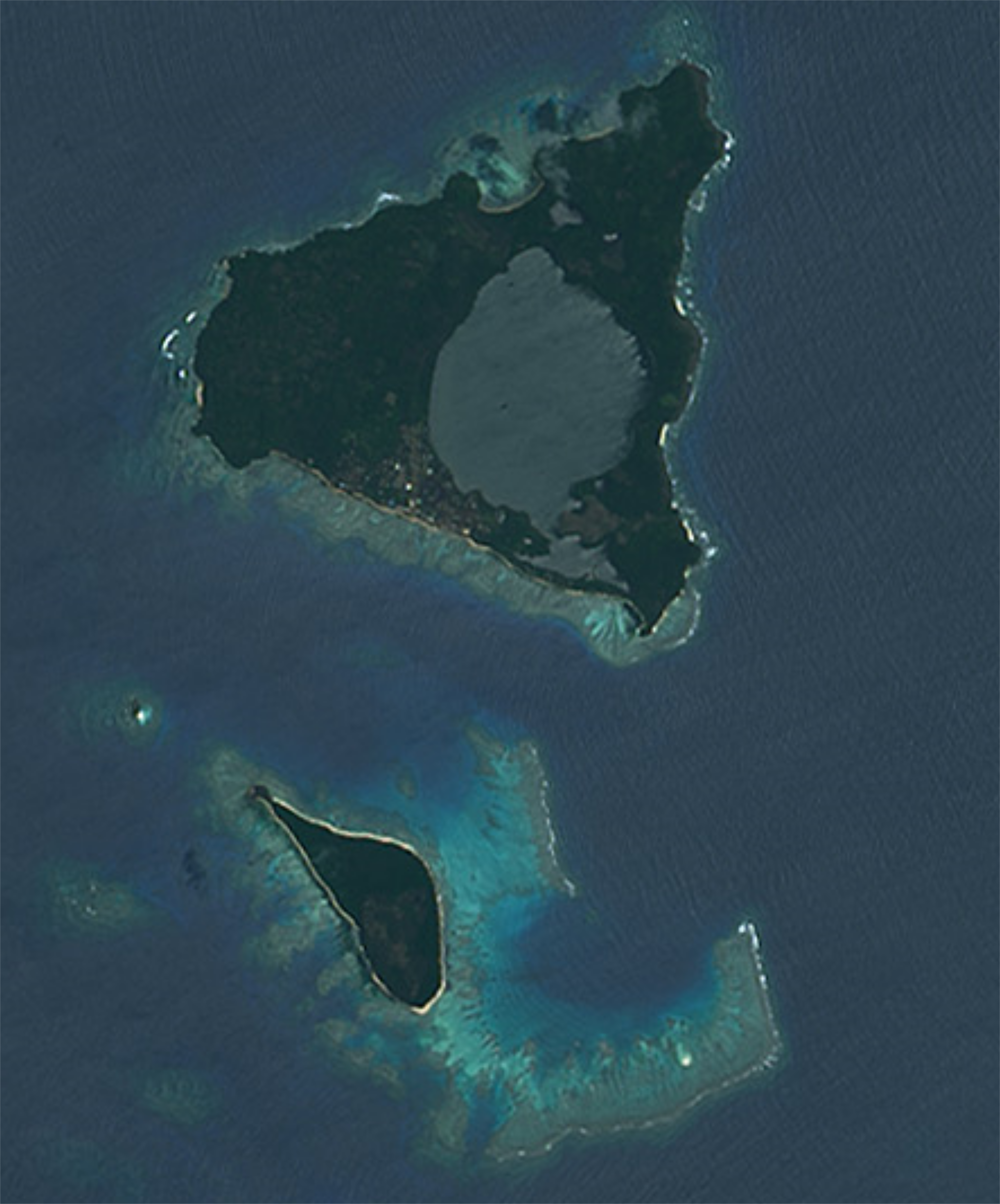
Nomuka islands in 2013

Nomuka is a small island in the southern part of the Haʻapai group of islands in Tonga. It is part of the Nomuka Group of islands, also called the ʻOtu Muʻomuʻa. Among neighboring islands are Kelefesia, Nukutula, Tonumea, Fonoifua, Telekitonga.

== Geography ==
Nomuka is 7 square kilometres in area. It has a large brackish lake (Ano Lahi) in the middle, and three smaller lakes—Ano Ha'amea, Ano Fungalei, and Molou. There are approximately 400–500 inhabitants. They subsist on fishing, farming, and remittances from family members abroad. The island has a secondary school, two primary schools, and a kindergarten. It has seven churches.

The island is accessible by boat only. Boats leave weekly from Nukuʻalofa and Lifuka, Haʻapai. There is one guesthouse on the island, and three or four small fale koloa, or convenience stores. It is home to the Royal Nomuka Yacht Club

== History ==
Notable historic visitors include Abel Tasman, Captain Cook, Captain Bligh, and William Mariner. The Dutch Abel Tasman made the first European discovery of the island, on 24 January 1643. A party went ashore to get water, and the description they brought back of the huge lake leaves little doubt about the identification. Tasman called it Rotterdam island, after the city of Rotterdam, a major port in the Netherlands, and noted in his maps the indigenous name of Amamocka, a misspelling of ʻa Nomuka, ʻa being a subject-indicating article. We also find the name of Amorkakij for the nearby smaller island of Nomuka Iki. Captain Bligh in the Bounty spent 3 days wooding and watering at Nomuka in April 1789. The mutiny on the Bounty occurred the day after they left.

== Population ==
Nomuka is known for raising up the greatest number of church leaders for the major Christian denominations in Tonga, such as Rev. Sione Lepa To'a the former president of the Free Wesleyan Church of Tonga, Rev. Seluipepeli Mafi and his son Rev Dr Feke Mafi as both former presidents of the Church of Tonga, and Pastor Tetileti Pahulu, a former president of the Seventh Day Adventist Church. Apart from these former church presidents, there are also pastors (and former pastors) and Christian workers serving under different denominations and parachurch organisations in Tonga and overseas.
