= Environmental issues in Peru =

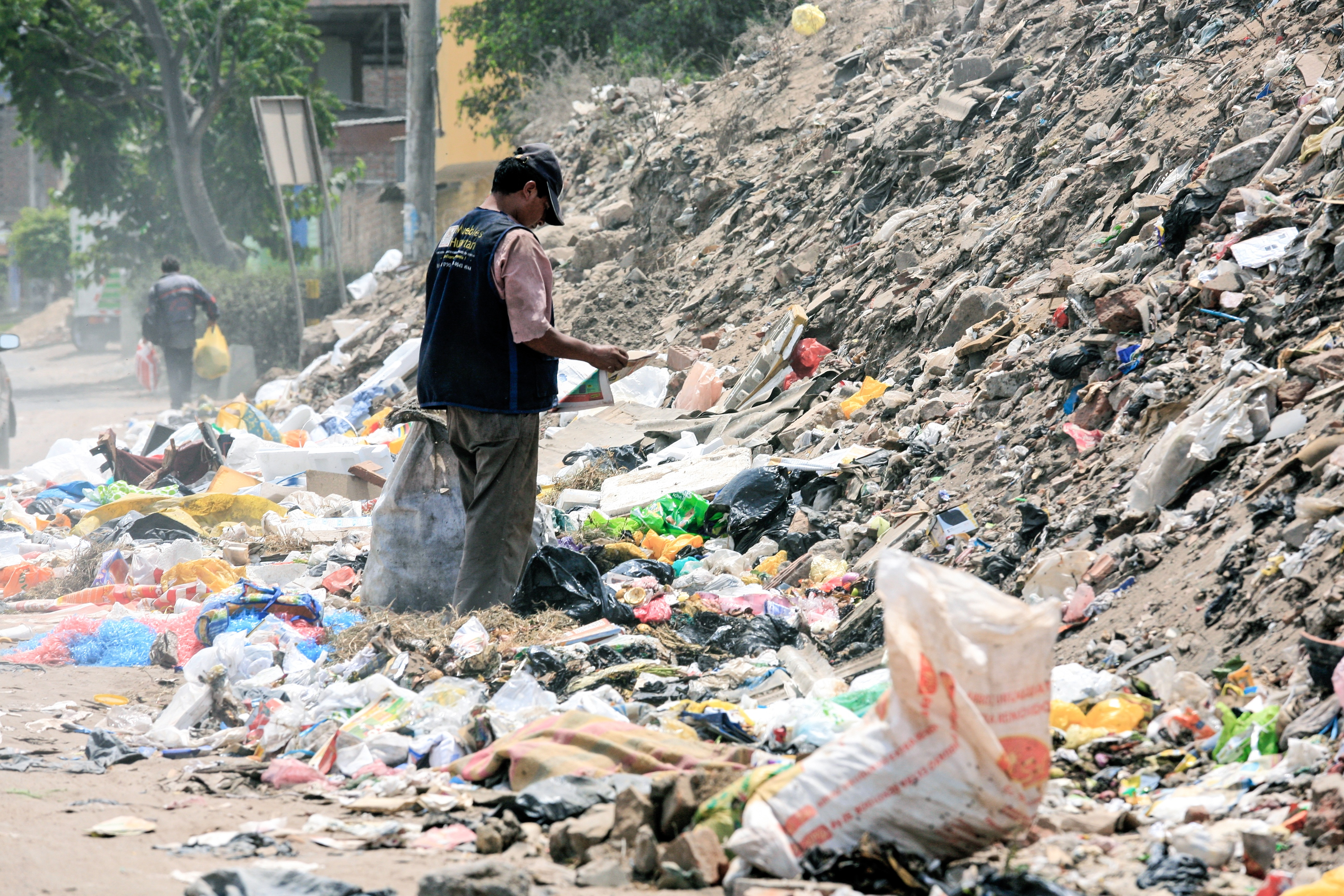
Plastic waste accumulating near a construction waste site in Peru.

The principal environmental issues in Peru are water pollution, soil erosion, pollution and deforestation. Although these issues are problematic and equally destructive, the Peruvian Environmental Ministry has been developing regulations and laws to decrease the amount of pollution created in major cities and has been making policies in order to decrease the present deforestation rate in Peru.

== Emissions ==
The Economic Commission for Latin America and the Caribbean (ECLAC) estimates that the economic losses related to climate change could reach over 15% of national gross domestic product (GDP) by 2100. In 2010, Peruvian greenhouse gas emissions represented only 0.4% of global emissions. However, emissions are rising nationwide – particularly in the energy and transport sectors. In an effort to combat this, the Government of Peru approved a law to establish a national greenhouse gas inventory system called INFOCARBONO. INFOCARBONO will enable different ministries to include greenhouse gas management in their work.

== Deforestation ==
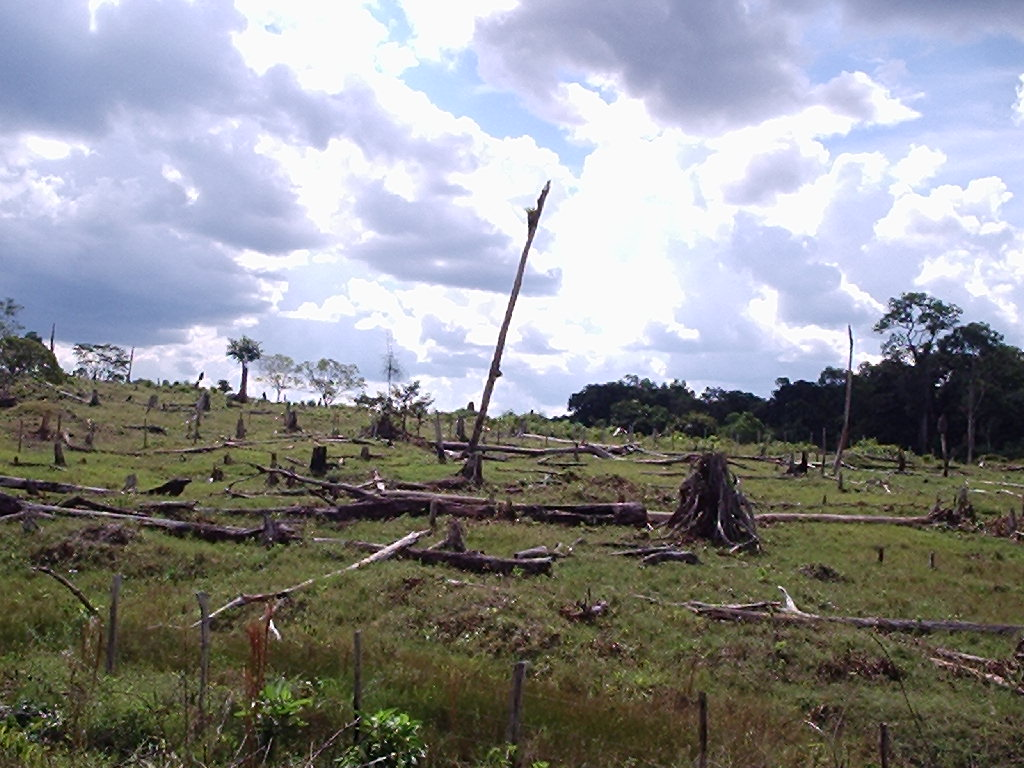
Deforestation of a Rainforest.

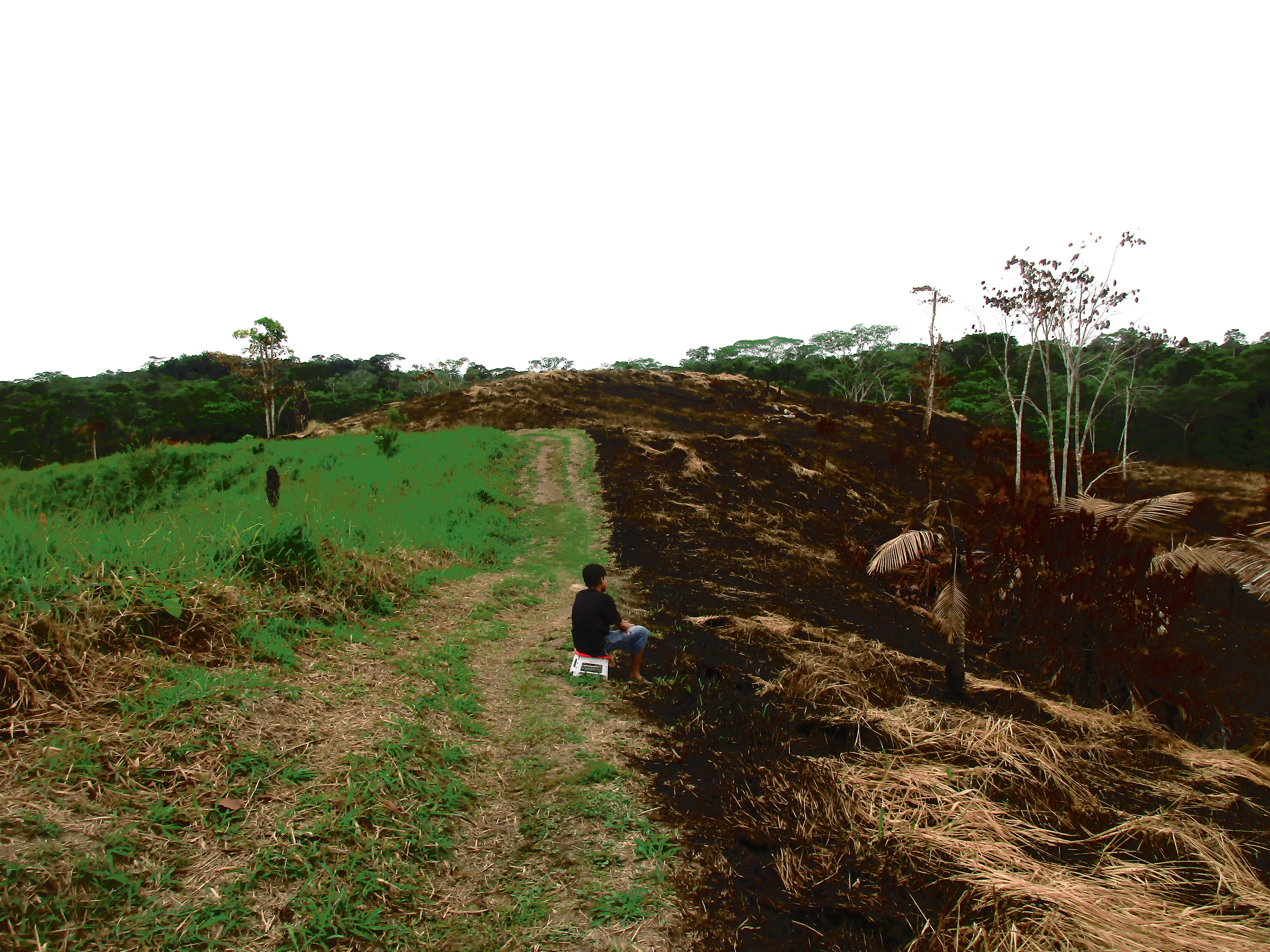
Deforestation in Barrio Floridos, Iquitos.

Deforestation in Peru is the destruction and removal of trees for non-forest use in Peru. As of 2013, more than 60% of Peru's land mass was covered by tropical forests, including the Peruvian Amazonia. According to the Ministry of Environment (Peru), the country lost 2.2 million hectares of tropical forest area, mostly in the Amazonian regions of Loreto, San Martín and Ucayali, between 2001 and 2018. According to Global Forest Watch, this was a 3.1% decrease in primary rain forest area during that period.147,000 additional hectares of tropical forest were removed in 2024. In 2014, the map of the Peruvian Amazon showed that more than 25% of the lost forest area was part of indigenous territories and protected natural areas. Deforestation directly leads to habitat destruction and the degradation of forests, which can compromise biodiversity and hinder the process of carbon capture. Causes of deforestation in Peru include subsistence agriculture, cattle ranching, logging, mining, and drug trafficking operations.

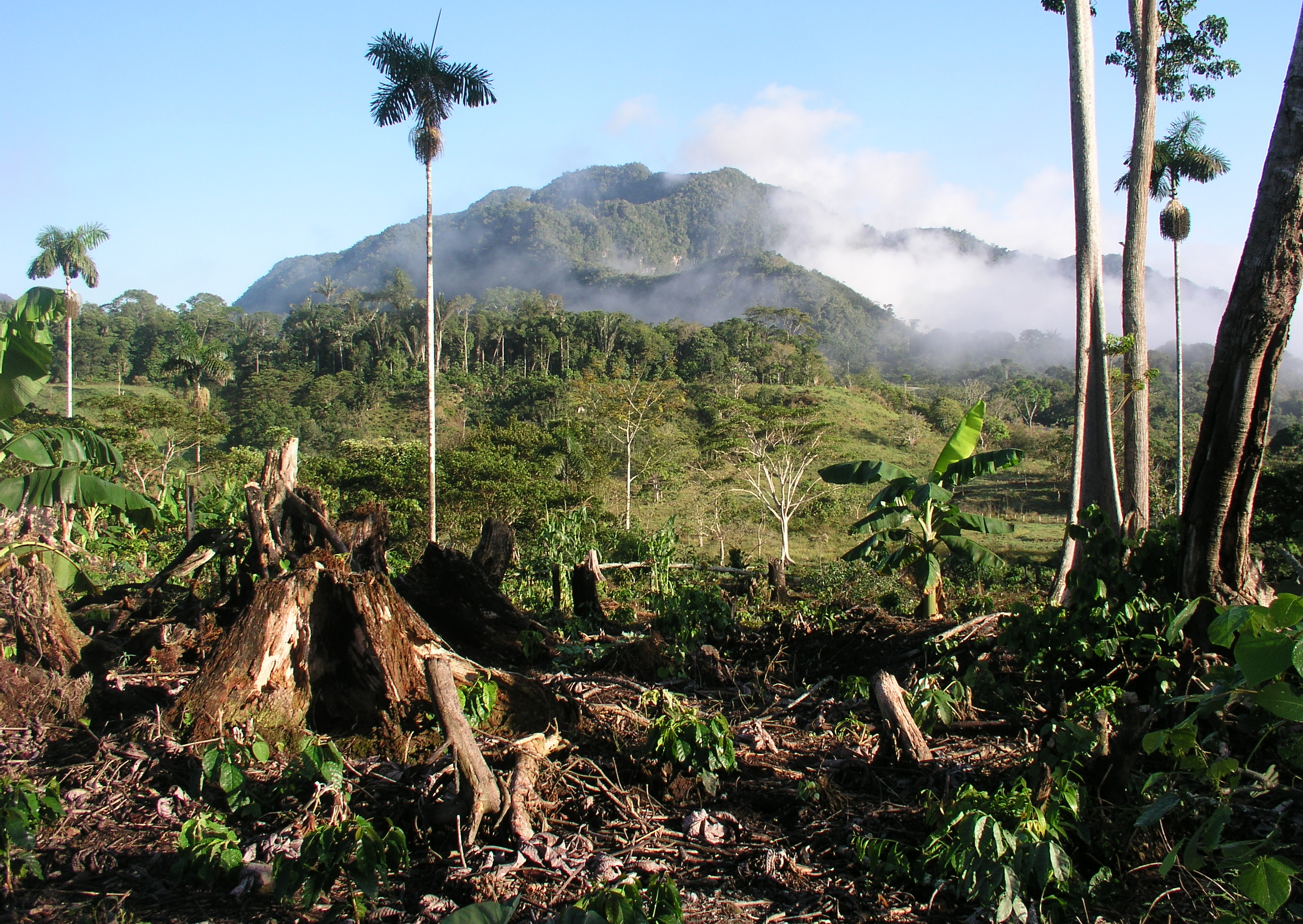
A recently deforested area in Nueva Cajamarca (Rioja, San Martin, Péru).

== Air pollution ==
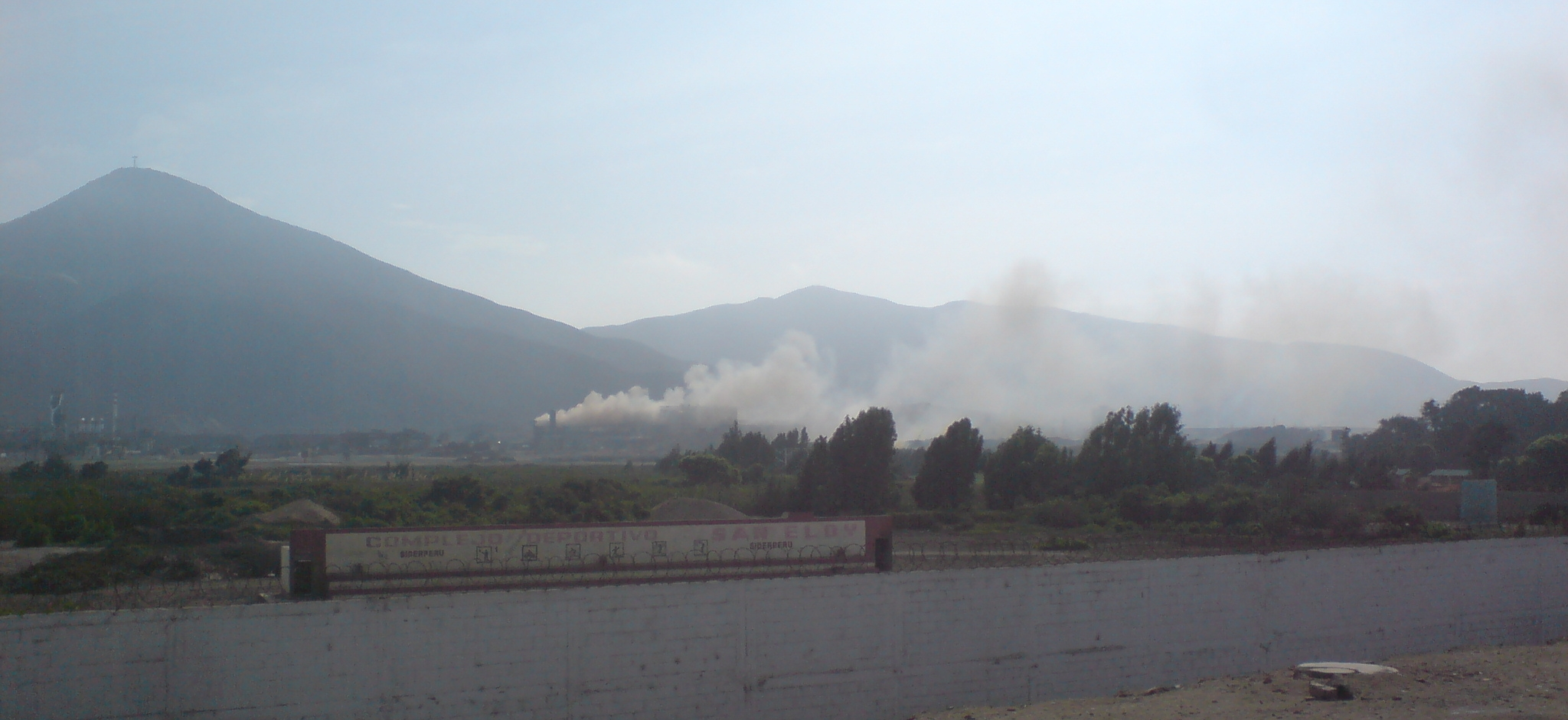
Contaminacion TOTAL - panoramio

Air pollution is a big problem in Peru, especially in Lima, the capital city, which is caused by industrial activity and vehicle emissions. In August 2006, air pollution in Lima surpassed the international standard by 122.1% The average concentration of PTS reached 166.57 micrograms per cubic meter, the international standard is 77 micrograms per cubic meter. In 2009, 1.5 tons of lead and 810 tons of sulphur dioxide, were emitted daily, which is four times the maximum allowed under Peruvian legislation. The Peruvian government has created an alert system for high levels of pollution. There are three levels: watch, danger and emergency. During an emergency, children, pregnant women, the elderly and the ailing may be asked to stay indoors. Those who are healthy enough to continue with their lives outside are advised to cover their mouths and noses with scarves or handkerchiefs—but not facemasks, because according to government spokesperson Carlos Rojas "people don't want images that further dramatize the situation." Also Peru is using "super tree" technology, created by Tierra Nuestra to try and fight the air pollution in the major cities. The super tree acts like 1200 real trees, purifying the air. It sucks the outside air, and under thermodynamic pressure it combines the toxic particles in the air with water, and then pumps out clean air. Unfortunately, there are byproduct to the process, which include mud and non potable water. The Super Tree cleans approximately 200,000 cubic meters of air per day, eliminating air pollutions like carbon dioxide.

== Water pollution ==
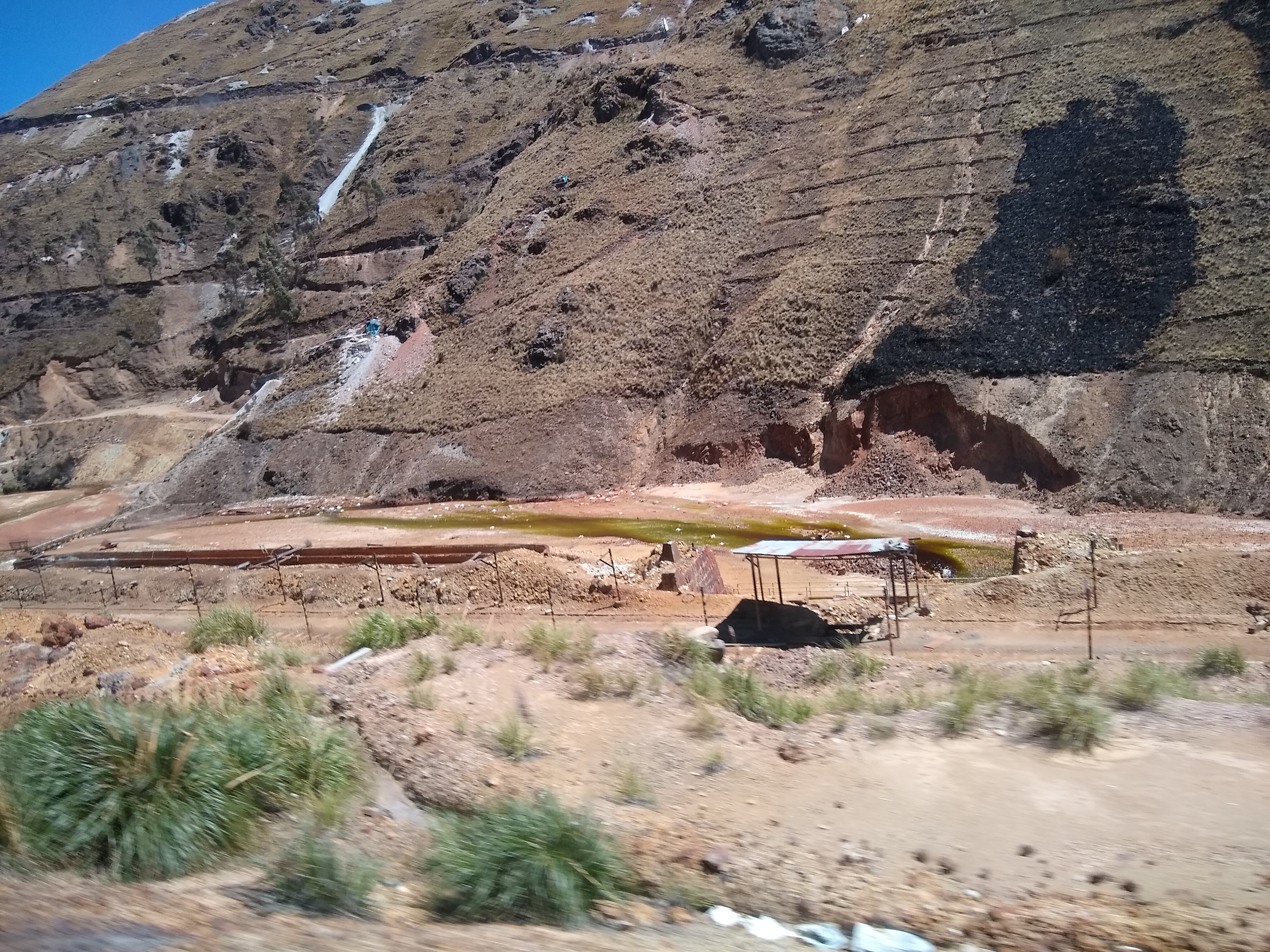
Near Quiruvilca Peru- water coming directly from mines

Water pollution sources in Peru include industrial waste, sewage and oil related waste. Peru has 1746 cu km of renewable water resources and 86% of this water is used for farming and 7% for industrial activity. In urban areas only 87% and in rural areas 62% of the population have access to clean water. In major cities 3.0 million tons of waste per year is created. President Alan García campaigned for a "water for all" strategic program, which proposed investment in 185 water supply and sanitation projects. The objective of this program is to expand potable water services from 76% to 88% of households; Sanitation from 57% to 77%; and sewage from 22% to 100% by 2015. Lake Titicaca is a specific concern to Puno in southeastern Peru because of its spiritual and historical significance. Contamination and pollution of the lake seriously affects the health of those that depend on it because current monitoring and testing of the lake is primitive and underfunded. Because of violence in and around the area the government is only now addressing the problem. According to the Oxfam report, more than half of Peru's rivers are extremely polluted in the North the Chillón, Yauli and Mantaro in the central region; and the Chili River in the South.

== Soil erosion ==
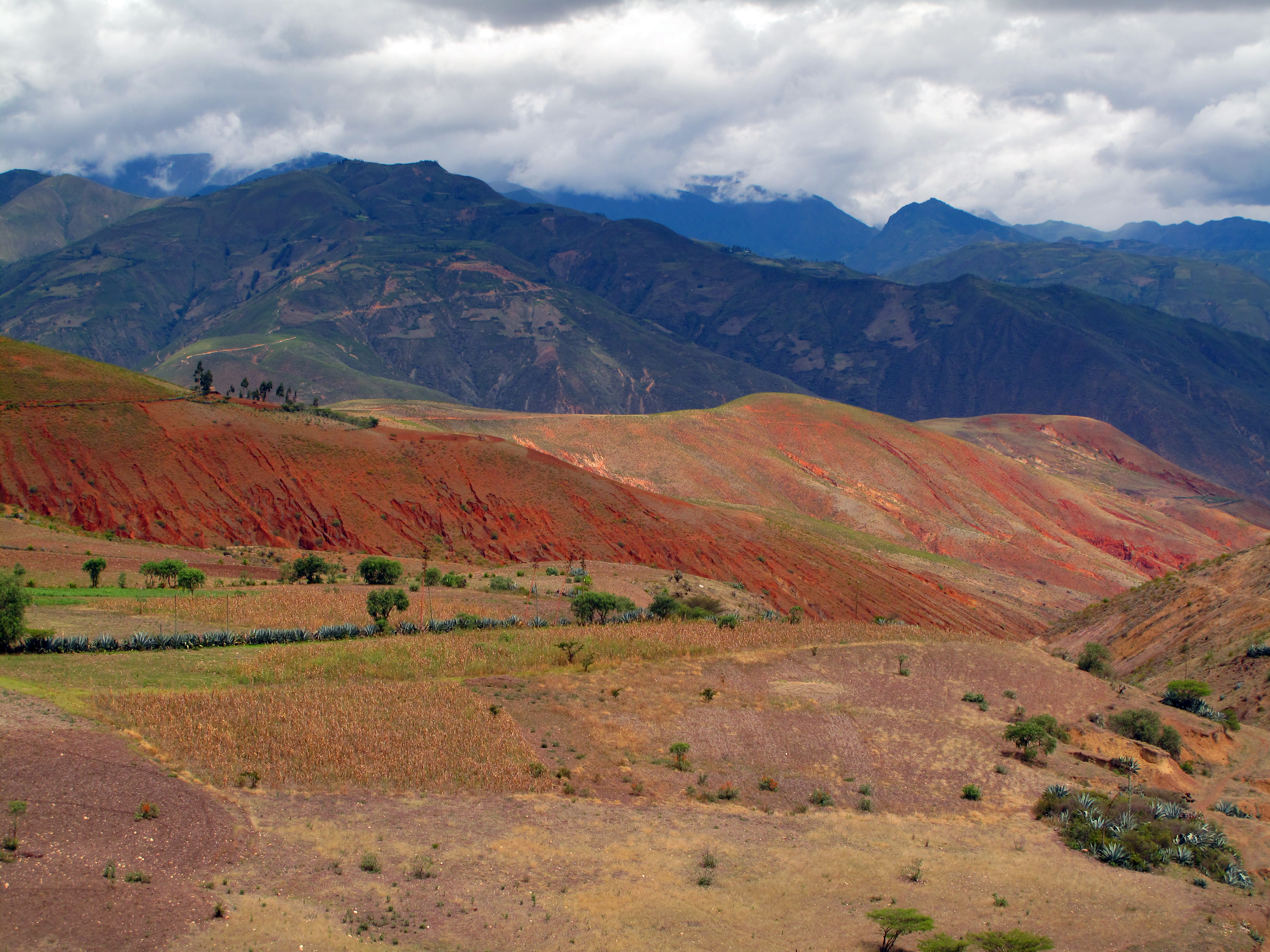
Soil erosion near Huancabamba.jpg

Peru's topography makes it susceptible to soil erosion. The coast of Peru is subject to wind erosion and water erosion is dominant in Sierra. Erosion also occurs in the High Selva when vegetation is cleared and in Low Selva where they get much rain on areas under slash and burn practises. The use of contoured lines, cover crops and mulching can control erosion to some extent depending on the climate and the slope. In addition, traditional methods can be used to prevent erosion like terracing and agroforestry.

== Oil spills ==
The Amazon rainforest and the Peruvian coast have suffered the worst consequences of constant oil spills resulting from the extractive activities of private and public companies. Between 1997 and 2021, more than 1,002 spills have been recorded nationwide. The worst oil spill in Peru's history occurred in January 2022 when crude oil leaked into the Pacific Ocean near La Pampilla, one of the largest refineries owned by the Spanish company Repsol, located in Callao, Lima.

Between 2000 and 2019, more than 470 oil spills were reported that affected ecosystems and the health of the indigenous population in the Amazon. Environmental leaders such as Olivia Bisa Tirko have demanded that the state and the company PetroPeru urgently remediate contaminated territories that leave them without access to food and water.
