= Atlas Building, Lima =

Building in Lima, Peru

Coordinates: 12°02′49″S 77°02′05″W

Atlas Building
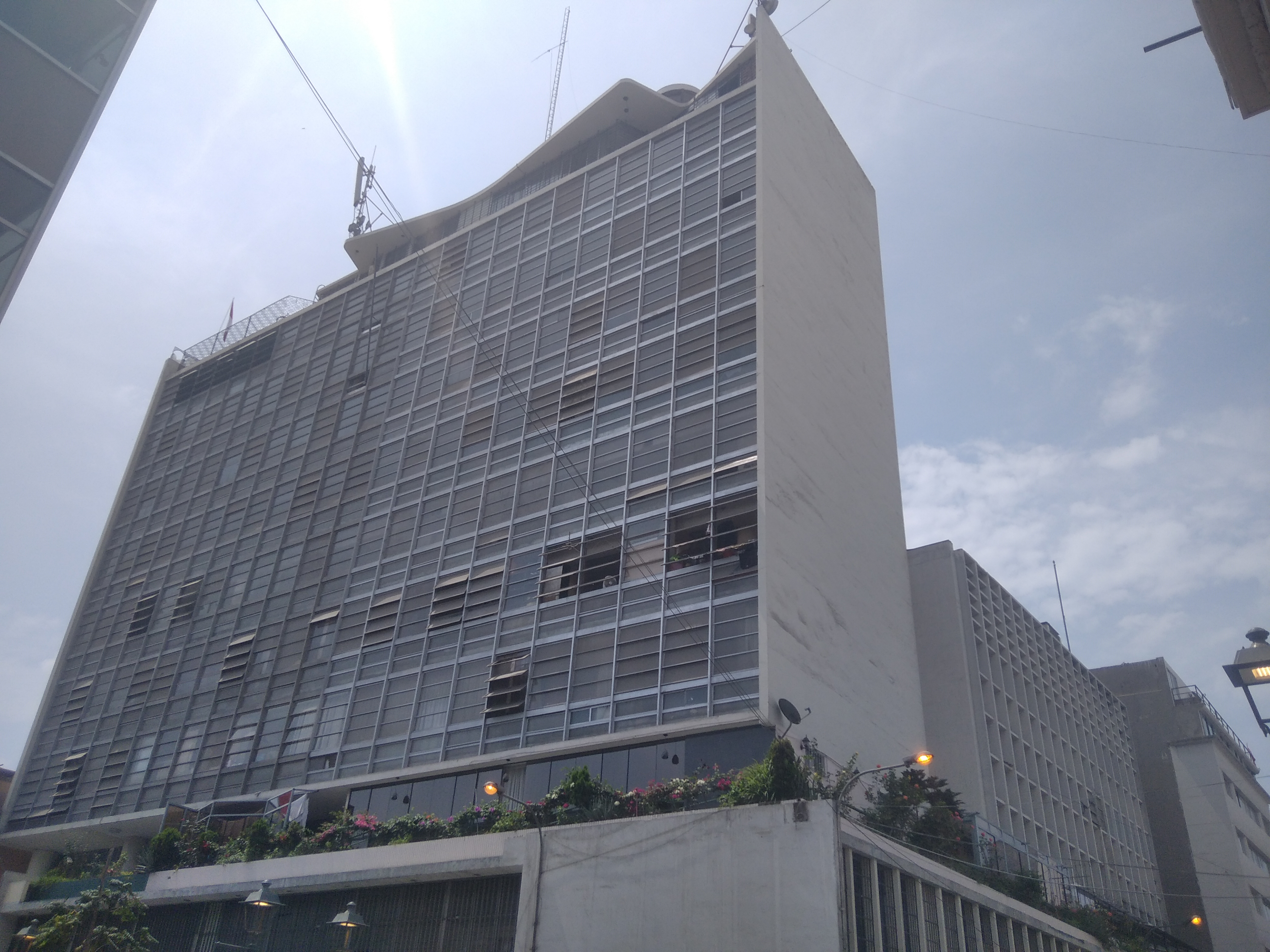

General information
- Architectural style: Modernist
- Address: Jr. Huancavelica & Caylloma
- Year(s) built: 1953–1955

Technical details
- Floor count: 11

Design and construction
- Architect(s): Walter Weberhofer

The Atlas Building (Spanish: Edificio Atlas; Edificio Seguros Atlas; Edificio de la Compañía Seguros Atlas) is a building designed by architect Walter Weberhofer with José Álvarez Calderón, located in the corners of Huancavelica and Caylloma streets in the historic centre of Lima, Peru. Built in 1955, it is located in the district of Lima. The building won the Gold Medal from the Municipality of Lima for Best Building of 1955, awarded on the Fiestas Patrias.

== History ==
The building, located at the intersection of the Huancavelica and Cailloma streets in the district of Lima, began work in 1953, and finished construction in 1955. It was built for the Atlas Insurance Company (Spanish: Compañía de Seguros Atlas).

It was designed as a commercial building, with warehouses, a leisure area, with a cafeteria in the roof-garden area, and offices, as well as two basements with parking for 70 cars. The main tower has eleven floors and a glass and aluminum façade.

The building was the thirty-second to be acquired by real estate company Arte Express in 2020.

The perspectives drawn for this building today are part of the collection of the Museum of Modern Art in New York City, and were featured in the exhibition Latin America in Construction, Architecture 1955-1980 held by the same museum in 2015.

== See also ==
- Cine Tauro, another building designed by Weberhofer in central Lima
