= Casa Fernandini =

Casa Fernandini may refer to:

- Casa Fernandini, Lima, in the historic centre of Lima
- Casa Fernandini, Santa María del Mar, in the southern seaside district of Santa María del Mar within the same city
