= Petroperú =

Peruvian state-owned oil company

Petróleos del Perú S.A. Petroperú
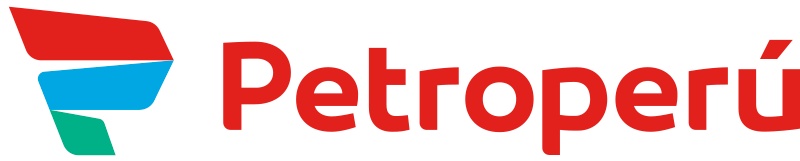

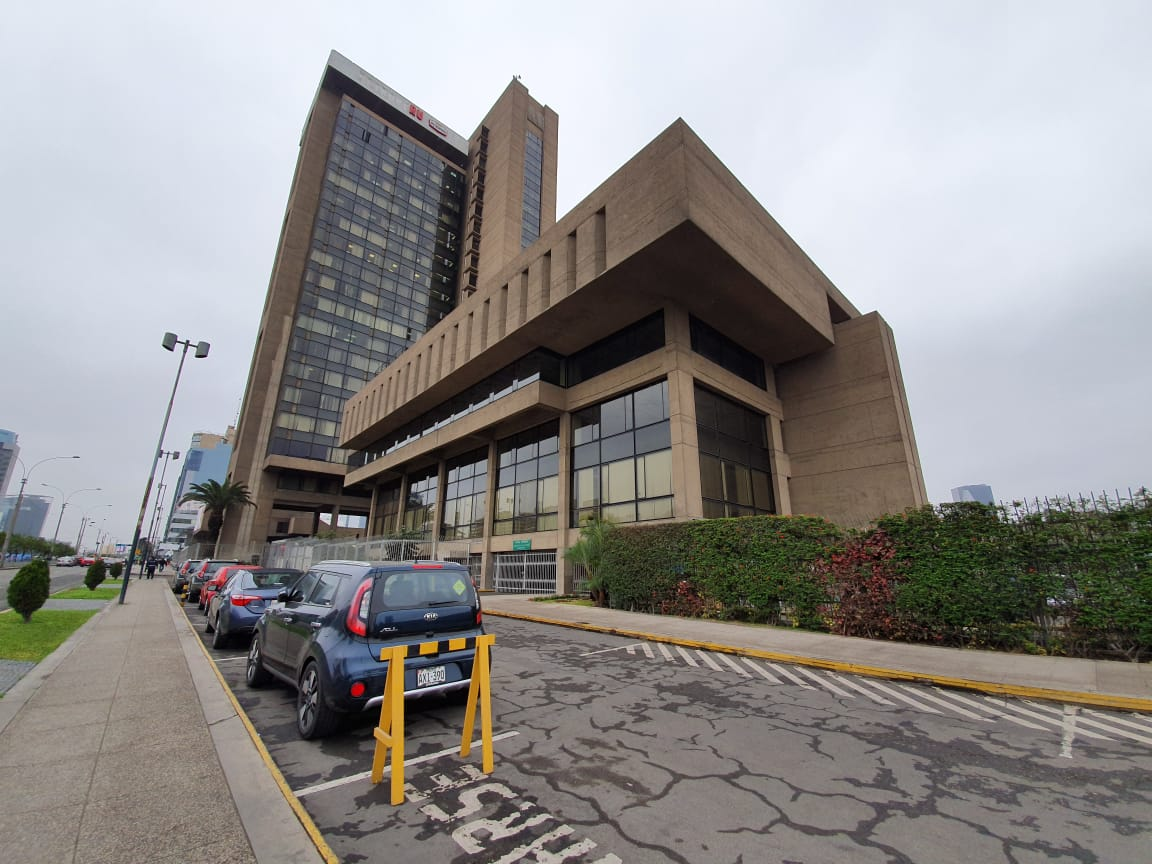
- Petroperu Building
- Type: State company
- Industry: Oil and gas
- Predecessor: Empresa Petrolera Fiscal
- Founded: 24 July 1969; 57 years ago
- Founder: Juan Francisco Velasco Alvarado
- Headquarters: Av. Enrique Canaval y Moreyra 150, Lima, Peru
- Area served: Worldwide
- Key people: Edmundo Lizarzaburu (Chairman)
- Products: Petroleum products Natural gas Refining; Exploration; Extraction; Asphalts; LPG; Diesel; Gasoline
- Owner: State of Peru
- Website: www.petroperu.com.pe

Petróleos del Perú (English: Petroleum of Peru), better known as Petroperú, is a Peruvian state-owned enterprise and private law dedicated to the transportation, refining, distribution, and commercialization of fuels and other petroleum products. It has been owned by the State of Peru since 1969, is considered among the taxpayers to the treasury, and currently employs more than 2,500 people.

Among the current strategic objectives of the company are the supply of fuel to the entire Peruvian market, as well as financial sustainability and its operations, with an emphasis on safety and care for the environment. Petroperú invests in education, health, and other sustainable development projects throughout the Peruvian territory.

== History ==
=== Background ===
On 9 October 1968, the dictatorship of General Juan Velasco Alvarado ordered the seizure and summary expropriation of the facilities of The International Petroleum Company (IPC), a subsidiary of Standard Oil of New Jersey, at the Talara refinery (Piura Department); carried out by General Fermín Málaga. This forced nationalization had a massive publicity effect, helped sway public opinion in favor of the military coup, and allowed the dictatorship to consolidate its grip on power. The date was declared by the military, as the Day of National Dignity, and celebrated as a public holiday until the end of the dictatorship in 1980.

=== Beginnings ===
Petroperú was created the following year by law decree issued by General Juan Velasco Alvarado on 24 July 1969. The newly created company was chaired by another General, Marco Fernández-Baca Carrasco and had to face the challenges of operating and maintaining the recently nationalized oil industry with local personnel. It had to do this without resources or technical support from global oil players, who had been alienated by the forced nationalization of the military government.

The company and the government nevertheless had the assistance of Soviet technicians and were able to retain middle managers, surviving and even thriving despite reduced production capacity. Extraction and refining progressively increased owing to oilfield discoveries in the northern jungle (Loreto Department), association agreements that followed after Gen Velasco's deposition by another coup in 1975, and the construction of the North Peruvian Pipeline (Oleoducto Norperuano).

=== 21st-century developments ===
During 2011, Petroperú participated in the construction of the Southern Pipeline, a project that aimed at improving the economic conditions in the south of the country. It also invested about 400 million dollars in the construction of the ethane pipeline that started in the city of Pisco, the same year.

In December 2020, the state oil company, at the special request of the Executive Branch, headed by President Francisco Sagasti, assumed the concession of the Natural Gas Distribution System by Pipeline Network of the South West Concession, for up to three years. This way, Petroperú took over the administration of this temporary concession in order to guarantee the continuity of the provision of the public service of natural gas distribution through the pipeline network in the Arequipa, Moquegua and Tacna regions. This assignment was assumed with full responsibility in a key period for the state company, which commenced a modernization process that included the implementation of important activities to allow it to evolve, maintaining the leadership and sustainability of the business, with transparency, and social and environmental responsibility.

In January 2021 it officially unveiled its new identity, the result of more than eight-years' work in a process that has resulted in a renewed version of the institution's image. With this change, Petroperú sought to position itself in the Peruvian fuel market with a sustainable and competitive projection. In the same year, it received authorization from the Executive Power to issue bonds worth up to $1 billion to finance the last phase of the modernization works of the Talara Refinery.

An oil spill in 2022, at the 177-kilometre (110 mi) mark on the North Peruvian Pipeline, resulted in oil slicks and subsequent contamination of rivers, and impacting fishing and food sources for Amazonian communities. Indigenous environmental activist, Olivia Bisa Tirko, demanded that the state and Petroperú remedy the environmental damage and questioned the hiring of remediation companies due to their alleged history of non-compliance in the management of toxic waste. In the Provincial Criminal Prosecutor's Office of Datem del Marañón – San Lorenzo, Petroperú filed, in 2022, four criminal complaints against Bisa Tirko for the alleged crimes of concealment, kidnapping, and endangering public safety; that were all dismissed in March 2023. Bisa Tirko reported that she was the victim of threats, harassment, and psychological violence against her and her children, including via telephone calls and strangers visiting her home.

=== Modernization initiative ===
In December 2013, at a press conference, the then head of the Ministry of Economy and Finance, Luis Miguel Castilla, pointed out that the modernization project for the Talara Refinery is part of "a much larger initiative" to modernize Petroperú. "The approved bill, which will be sent to Congress for debate and approval, includes an administrative and business unit reorganization, which will ensure the financial reorganization and sustainability of the company's operations," he said. It also includes a very aggressive plan to "install good corporate governance practices," as the main oil companies in the world have. Also, the modernization plan includes a strategy to open the company's capital to private partners, up to 49%, and to be listed on the Stock Exchange, a target for the following months and years. "Another part of the company's share package within the 49% that will be offered on the stock market will be destined to a citizen participation program," he announced. Castilla emphasizes that the incorporation of private capital "is essential" to modernize and accelerate better management processes within the company.

For his part, the president of Petroperu in that period, Héctor Reyes Cruz, believes that the modernization includes building a new complex to put aside the current infrastructure of the Piura refinery. "There are nine industrial plants, plus auxiliary plants, which add up to 15 new plants at the Talara refinery. The plants that are currently operating will be out of service", he mentioned. Similarly, he stressed that the project is about "the new Talara refinery", which will remove the sulfur content from fuels to make them more friendly to the health and environment of Peruvians. The new refinery will produce high-octane gasoline, will be able to process heavier crude oils and the investment made will benefit the Piura region and the entire country. "This project generates flows that by themselves pay for the project in all its context and, furthermore, it is part of the modernization of Petróleos del Perú," he points out.

Currently, Petroperú is close to completing the last phase of the Talara Refinery modernization project. For this last phase, it requires 700 million dollars, which will be obtained with the issuance of bonds worth up to 1 billion dollars. This is thanks to the fact that it received approval to issue them from the government. However, it is known that this debt issuance will not be endorsed by the Executive. Thanks to this new effort, the refinery, which is close to 93% under construction, is expected to expand its crude oil refining capacity from 65,000 to 95,000 barrels per day.

== Products ==
=== Capacity ===
Petroperú has a strategic place in the provision of energy throughout the country. Its approximate refining capacity is 94,500 barrels per day (B/D), which represents 46% of Peru's total refining capacity. It is the owner of the Talara Refinery, the Conchán Refinery, the Iquitos Refinery, the El Milagro Refinery and the Pucallpa Refinery, five of the six refineries that exist throughout the national territory. It is known that it only operates four of these five refineries since the Pucallpa refinery is leased to Maple Gas and, on the other hand, the El Milagro Refinery has still been out of service since January 2015.

=== Derivatives ===
The company has the necessary coverage to meet the national demand because it has a presence throughout the country. It has the capacity to meet the requirements of foreign companies and is a strategic supplier to the Armed Forces and National Police of Peru. The fuels and derived products produced by Petroperú include: LPG, Gasoline Super Plus, Gasohol Super Plus, biodiesel, Diesel Ultra, industrial oils, marine fuels, and aviation fuels. In addition to fuels, Petroperú also distributes solvents, naphthenic acid and asphalts.

== Projects ==
=== New Talara refinery ===
The Talara Refinery Modernization Project is an engineering and construction megaproject that consists of the installation of new process units and facilities aimed at improving product quality, increasing the refinery's production capacity, and implementing more complex processes. and more advanced technology. In 2018, the economic and environmental benefits were claimed to include: desulfurize fuels, improve the octane number of gasoline, process heavier crude oils, reduce the production of residuals, implement new facilities that the modernized refinery will require, and produce cleaner fuels.

On 17 December 2013, then-President Ollanta Humala promulgated Law 30130, which declared the modernization of the Talara Refinery to be of public necessity and national interest to ensure the preservation of air quality and public health. The law also indicates that measures be adopted to strengthen the corporate governance of Petroperú.

=== Lot 64 ===
The objective of the Project is to extract the crude oil reserves discovered in the Situche Central field, in Lot 64, located in the Loreto region.

The Project design foresees a modular execution scheme that facilitates the putting into production of the discovery wells (early production) and that allows the development of the deposit, in accordance with the confirmation of its productive potential:

- Phase A: Putting Well SC-3X into production
- Phase B: Putting Well SC-2X into production
- Phase C: Comprehensive development of the Situche Central Field

Additionally, the project includes the drilling of an exploratory well to increase the hydrocarbon reserves in the lot.

The project was planned to be developed in accordance with the terms and conditions of the Joint Investment contract signed by Petroperú S.A. and Geopark Peru S.A.C. which included an initial participation of 25% and 75% respectively. However, in July 2020, Geopark Peru S.A.C. decided to abandon Lot 64. Petroperú accepted the assignment of 75% of the additional participation, thus obtaining 100% of the rights and obligations as a contractor.

=== Transportation of Heavy Crudes ===
Most of the oil to be transported through the North Peruvian Pipeline is classified as heavy crude (density below 20° API), so it is necessary to adapt this transportation system in order to transport said crude. The project has been called the Heavy Crude Transportation Project (PTCP).

The heavy crude from the lots located in the northern jungle of Peru will be transported by the North Branch of the ONP, from Andoas to Station 5 and from there to Bayóvar through Section II. Section I of the ONP (Station 1 - Station 5) will be used when the Perenco company transports its early production of 7 MBPD (July 2013) by river and delivers it to the ONP at Station 1 (San José de Saramuro), for its transfer to Bayovar.

=== Other refinery Projects ===
The company has a feasibility study prepared by the Spanish company Fluor, for a future modernization of the Iquitos Refinery. It has also formed a Task-Force team to formulate a medium-term project for the modernization of the Conchán Refinery, another of its refineries located south of Lima. It will also explore lot 192, in which it is looking for partners.

== Chairmen of the Board ==
- Marco Fernández Baca (1972–1975)
- Máximo León-Velarde (1975–1976)
- César Augusto Freitas (1976–1978)
- Víctor López Mendoza (1978)
- Julio Dávila Valeriano (1978–1980)
- Víctor Montori Alfaro (1980–1982)
- Juan F. Cassabone Rasselet (1982–1984)
- Alfredo Zúñiga y Rivero (1984–1985)
- Alfredo Carranza Guevara (1985–1986)
- Jaysuño Abramovich Schwartzberg (1986–1989)
- Daniel Núñez Castillo (1989–1990)
- Jaime Quijandría Salmón (1990–1992)
- Emilio Zúñiga Castillo (1993–1995)
- Alberto Pandolfi Arbulú (1995–1996)
- Armando Echeandía Luna (1996)
- Jorge Kawamura Antich (1996–2000)
- Alejandro Narváez Liceras (2003–2005)
- Róger Arévalo Ramírez (2005–2006)
- César Gutiérrez Peña (2006–2008)
- Luis Rebolledo Soberón (2009–2011)
- Humberto Campodónico Sánchez (2011–2012)
- Héctor Reyes Cruz (2013–2014)
- Pedro Touzzet Gianello (2014–2015)
- Germán Velásquez (2015–2016)
- Luis Eduardo García-Rosell Artola (2016–2018)
- James Atkins Lerggios (2018–2019)
- Carlos Paredes Lanatta (2019–2020)
- Eduardo Alfredo Guevara Dodds (2020 to date)

== Branding ==
As part of its renewal process, Petroperú embarked on an identity change that took more than eight years. The company decided to replace the Huacal, a pre-Inca religious funerary mask, which was part of the previous isotype, with the letter P, an acronym for oil and Peru, which now becomes the new face of the company. The isotype is clad in the colors green, white, red and light blue.

=== Slogans ===
- 1973-90s: Symbol of Peruvian Identity
- 1990s: Improving Quality of Life
- 2010-2012: The Energy that Moves your World
- 2014: Growing together with all Peruvians
- 2014-2020: The energy that Moves Us
- Currently: Getting the best for Peru

== Headquarters ==
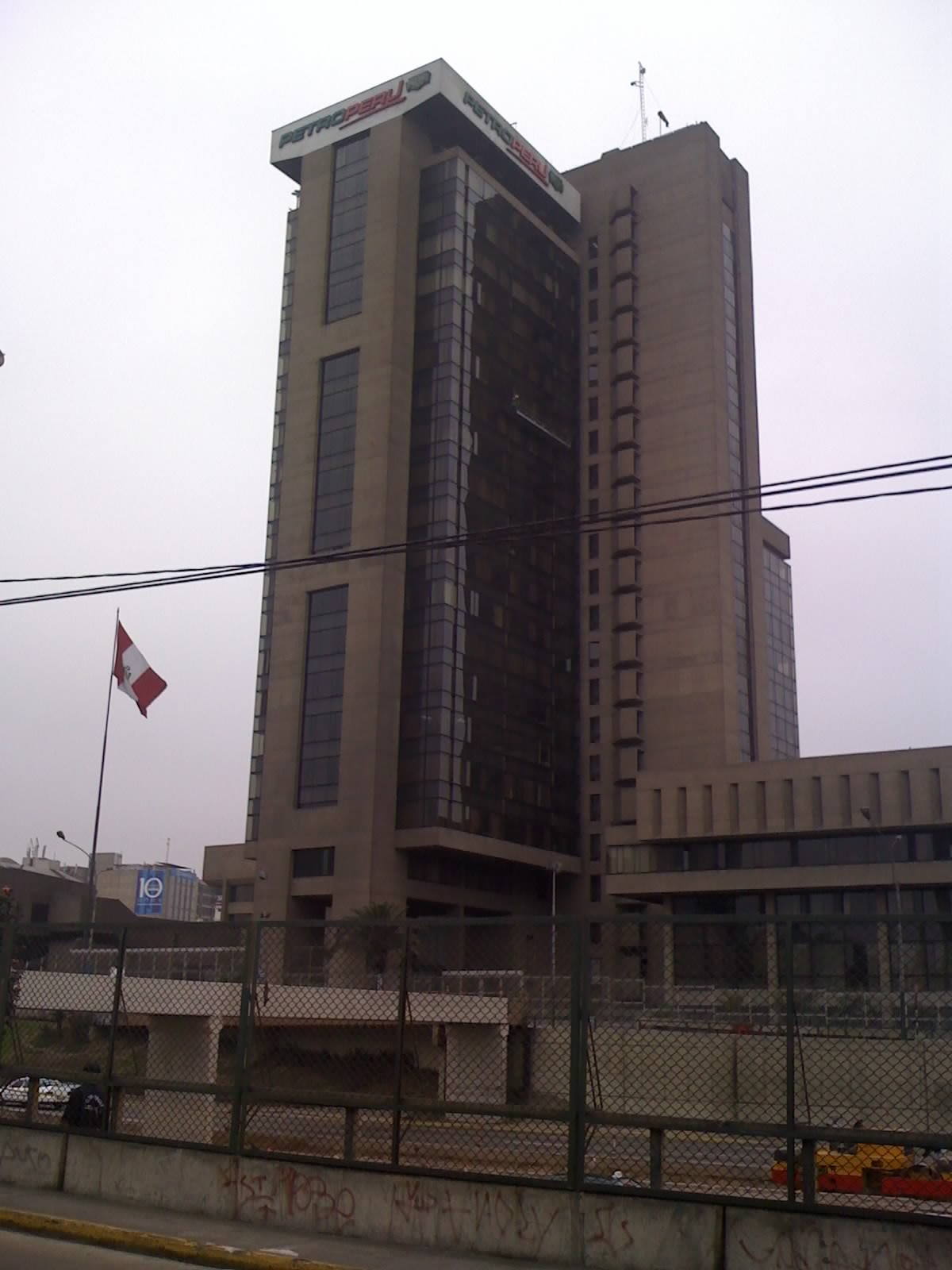
Petroperu Building

The Petroperu Building is a building located in the San Isidro district, in the city of Lima.

Designed by the architects Walter Weberhofer and Daniel Arana Ríos in the Brutalist architectural style, it was inaugurated in 1973.

== See also ==
- List of petroleum companies
- List of companies of Peru
- Talara Refinery
- La Pampilla refinery
