= César Gutiérrez Peña =

Peruvian mechanical engineer (1956–2026)

President of the Social Health Insurance of Peru
- In office 2002–2003
- President: Alan García
- Preceded by: Roger Arevalo Ramirez
- Succeeded by: Luis Rebolledo Soberón

President of Petroperú
- In office 2006–2008
- President: Alejandro Toledo
- Preceded by: Ignacio Basombrío Zender
- Succeeded by: José Luis Chirinos Chirinos

Personal details
- Born: César Felipe Gutiérrez Peña; 22 October 1956 Ica, Peru
- Died: 9 March 2026 (aged 69) Lima, Peru
- Party: Union for Peru
- Education: Saint Aloysius Gonzaga National University
- Occupation: Mechanical engineer

César Felipe Gutiérrez Peña (22 October 1956 – 9 March 2026) was a Peruvian mechanical engineer. A member of Union for Peru, he served as president of the Social Health Insurance of Peru from 2002 to 2003, and as president of Petroperú from 2006 to 2008.

Gutiérrez Peña died in Lima on 9 March 2026, at the age of 69.
