= Walter Weberhofer =

Peruvian architect

- Born: March 24, 1923; San Jerónimo de Tunán, Junín, Peru
- Died: December 18, 2002 (aged 79); Lima, Peru
- Occupation: Architect
- Years active: 1946–1983

Walter Weberhofer Quintana (San Jerónimo de Tunán; 1923 — Lima; December 18, 2002) was a Peruvian architect of the 20th century, affiliated to Modern architecture.

== Biography ==
Weberhofer was born on March 24, 1923, to parents Oswaldo Weberhofer Pilts and Dolores Quintana Gurt. His father, born in 1886 in the Austro-Hungarian town of Liezen, was a park ranger in nearby Graz. He emigrated to Argentina in 1912 and, after living in Asunción, left for Peru in 1921 to work on a bridge in the Mantaro River, marrying his wife the following year.

He studied at the Alfonso Ugarte School during his youth. He later studied architecture from 1947 to 1951 at the National School of Engineering. Prior to his studies, he worked as a structural draftsman at the Ministry of Public Works and in the office of architect Enrique Seoane Ros. Later he carried out his professional internships in Brazil.

From 1957 to 1965, he began his partnership with the architect Remigio Collantes with whom he developed several structures, mainly houses in Santa María del Mar.

== Notable works ==
- Atlas Building, Lima (with José Álvarez Calderón, 1954)
- Casa Fernandini, Santa María del Mar (1958)
- Cine Tauro (1957–8)
- Coliseo Gran Chimu (1965–1971, with Gilberto Bendezú and Miguel Ángel Ganoza)
- Edificio Petroperú (1969–1973, with Daniel Arana Ríos)
