= Edificio Petroperú =

Building in Lima, Peru

Petroperú Building
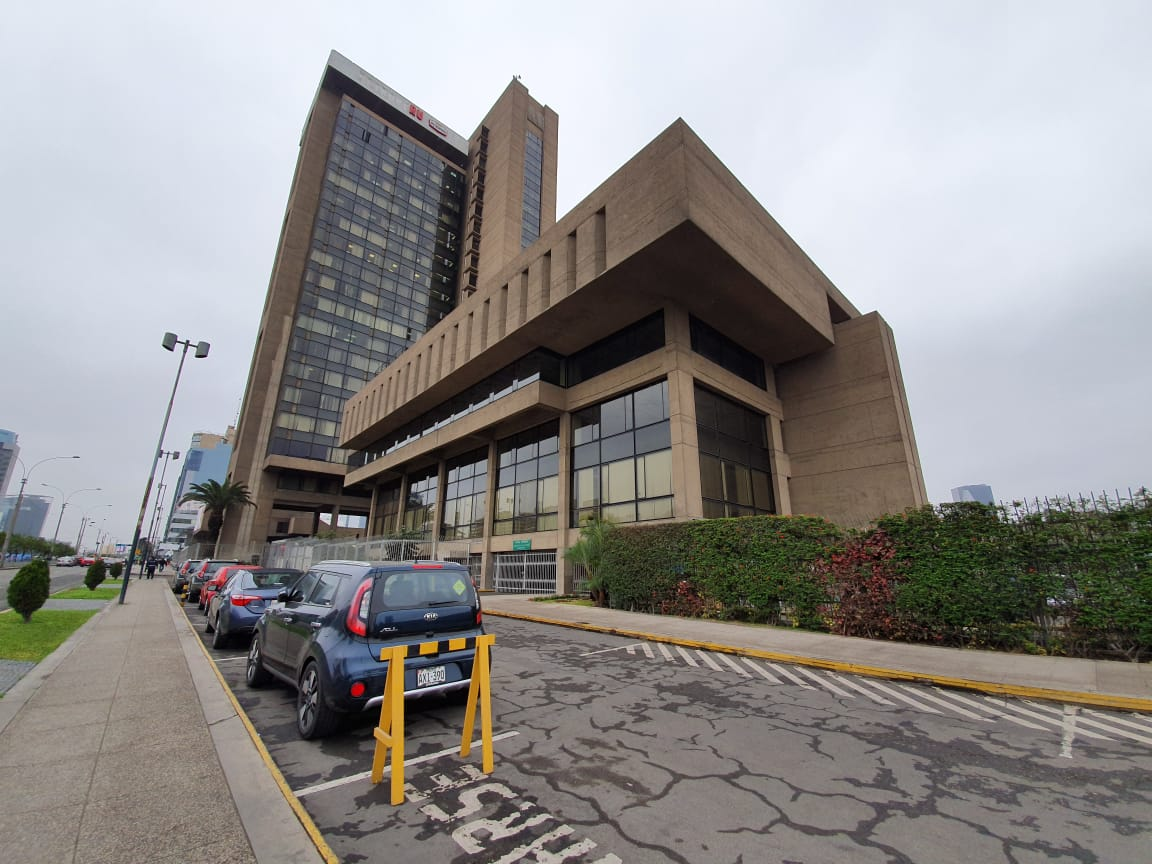
- Interactive map of the Petroperú Building area

General information
- Architectural style: Brutalism
- Location: Av. Enrique Canaval Moreyra 150
- Year built: 1969–1973
- Owner: Petroperú

Height
- Height: 82 m

Technical details
- Floor count: 22

Design and construction
- Architects: Walter Weberhofer, Daniel Arana Ríos

The Petroperú Building is a building located in San Isidro District, Lima. It functions as the main office of Petroperú, a state company dedicated to refining, transporting, distributing and marketing oil in Peru.

== History ==
The building, designed by the architects Daniel Arana Ríos and Walter Weberhofer, was the winning design in a contest organised by the military government of Juan Velasco Alvarado in the early 1970s. The building, strategically located in central San Isidro, was projected to host the offices of state company Petroperú, being inaugurated in 1973.

== Overview ==
It stands at the intersection of Luis Bedoya Reyes and Canaval y Moreyra avenues. It has twenty-two floors and three basements in addition to having a helipad on top and is part of the architectural style known as brutalism.

In addition to Petroperú, the building houses several public offices as well as the Ministry of Housing, Construction and Sanitation, the Agency for the Promotion of Private Investment and several art galleries.

== See also ==
- List of tallest buildings in Peru
- Javier Alzamora Valdez Building
