= Ventanilla District =

District of Callao, Peru

Ventanilla
- District
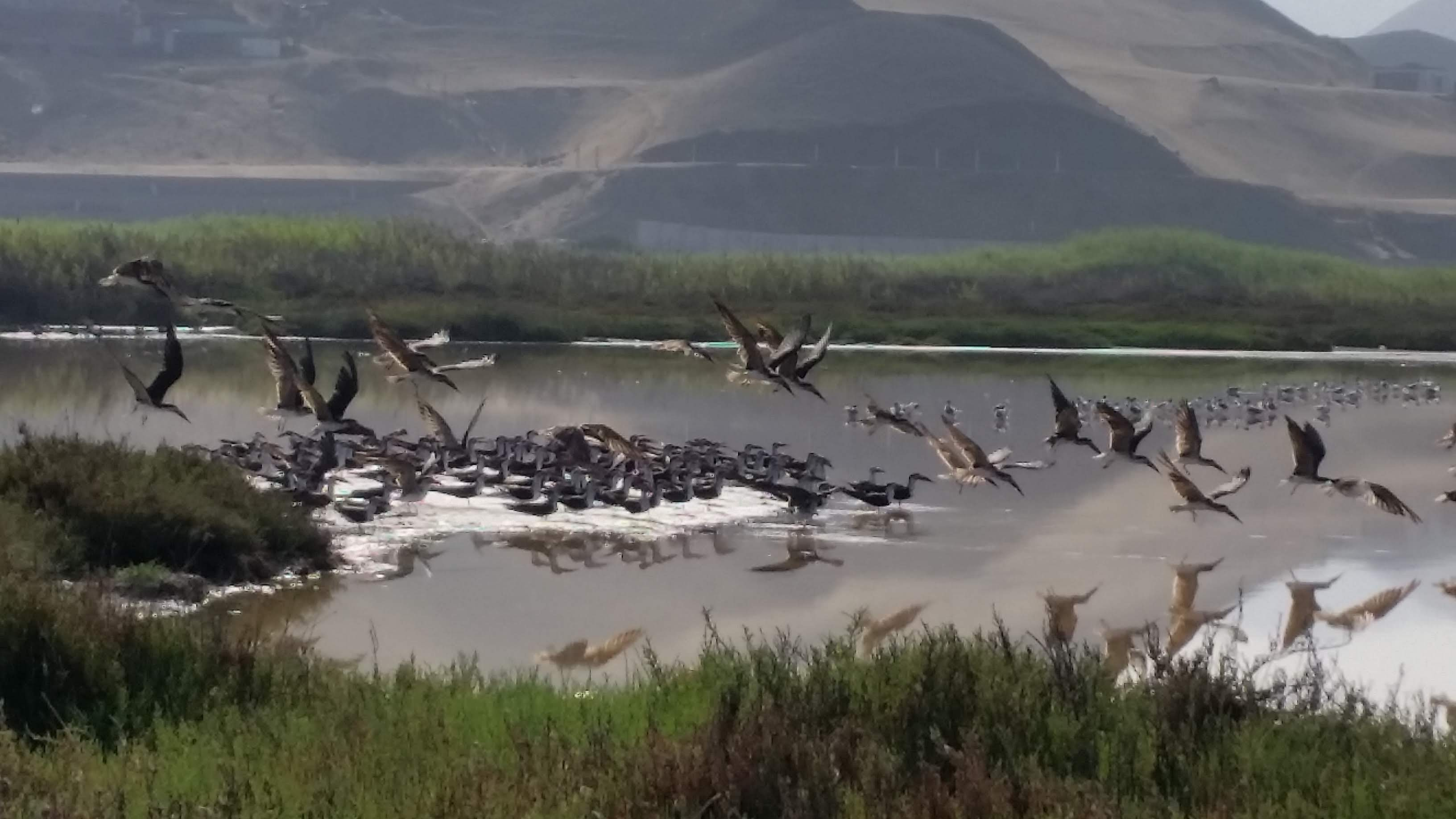
- Black skimmers in the wetlands protected area

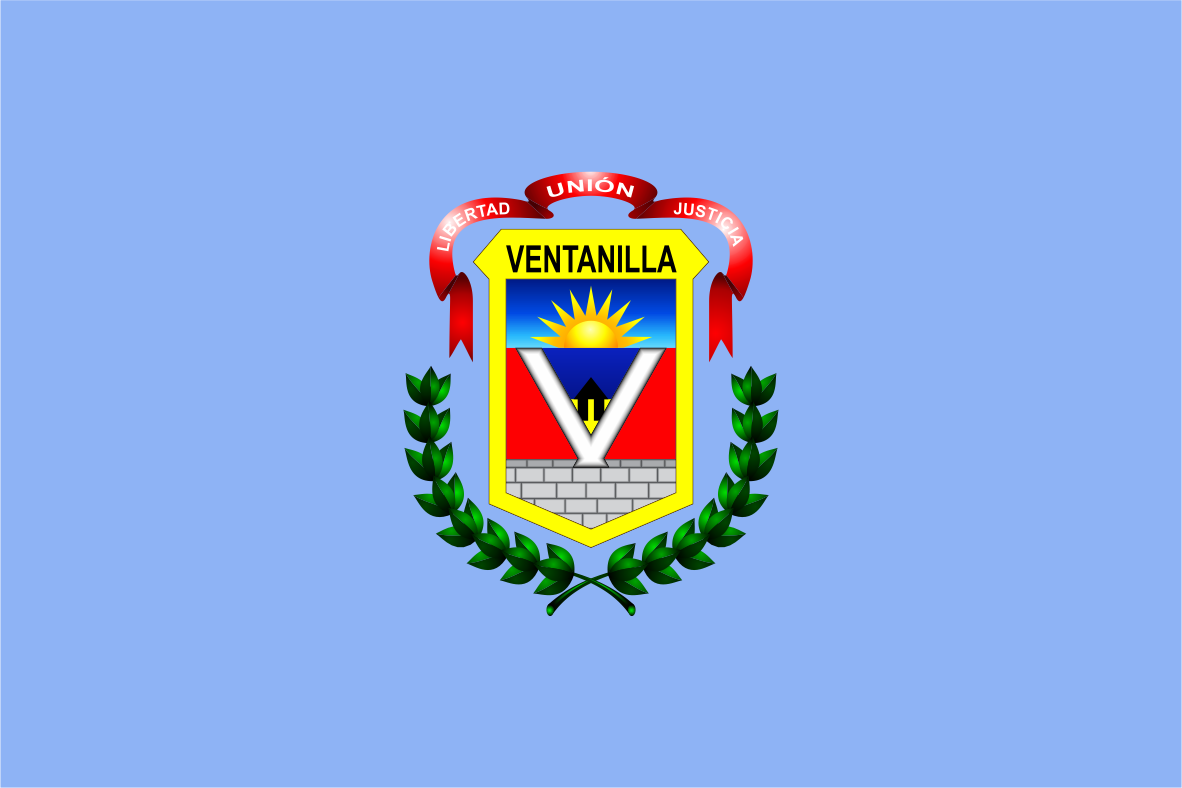
- Flag Coat of arms

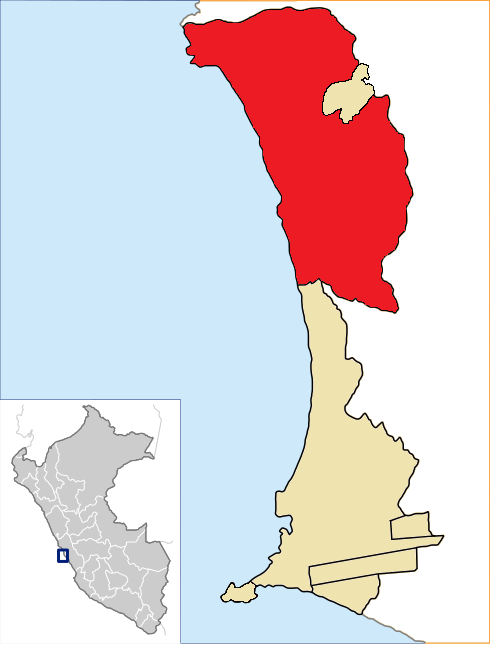
- Location in Callao
- Coordinates: 11°51′20″S 77°04′25″W
- Country: Peru
- Province: Callao
- Founded: January 28, 1969
- Capital: Ventanilla

Government
  - Mayor: Pedro Carmelo Spadaro Philips (2019-2022)

Area
  - Total: 73.52 km^{2} (28.39 sq mi)
- Elevation: 71 m (233 ft)

Population (2017)
  - Total: 315,600
  - Density: 4,293/km^{2} (11,120/sq mi)
- Time zone: UTC-5 (PET)
- UBIGEO: 070106
- Website: www.muniventanilla.gob.pe

Ventanilla is a district of Callao, Peru. Covering more than half of the province's territory, it is Callao's largest district.

The current mayor of Ventanilla is Pedro Carmelo Spadaro.

== History ==
It was officially established as a district on January 28, 1969. The first stone for the building of Ventanilla was placed on September 24, 1960, in what is now the Central Church of Ventanilla San Pedro Nolasco.

== Geography ==
The district has a total land area of 73.52 km^{2}. Its administrative center is located 71 meters above sea level. Ventanilla is located in the northern part of the province.

Ventanilla is made up of eight urban zones and more than 160 neighborhoods (barrios).

=== Boundaries ===
- North: Santa Rosa and Ancón (both in the Lima Province)
- East: Puente Piedra (Lima Province) and Mi Peru (Callao).
- South: Downtown Callao, and San Martín de Porres (Lima Province)
- West: Pacific Ocean

== Notable people ==
- Santiago David Távara

== Demographics ==
According to the 2005 census by the INEI, the district has 243,526 inhabitants and a population density of 3312.4 persons/km^{2}.

== See also ==
- Administrative divisions of Peru
- La Pampilla refinery
