= Santa María del Mar District, Lima =

District of Lima, Peru

Santa María del Mar
- District
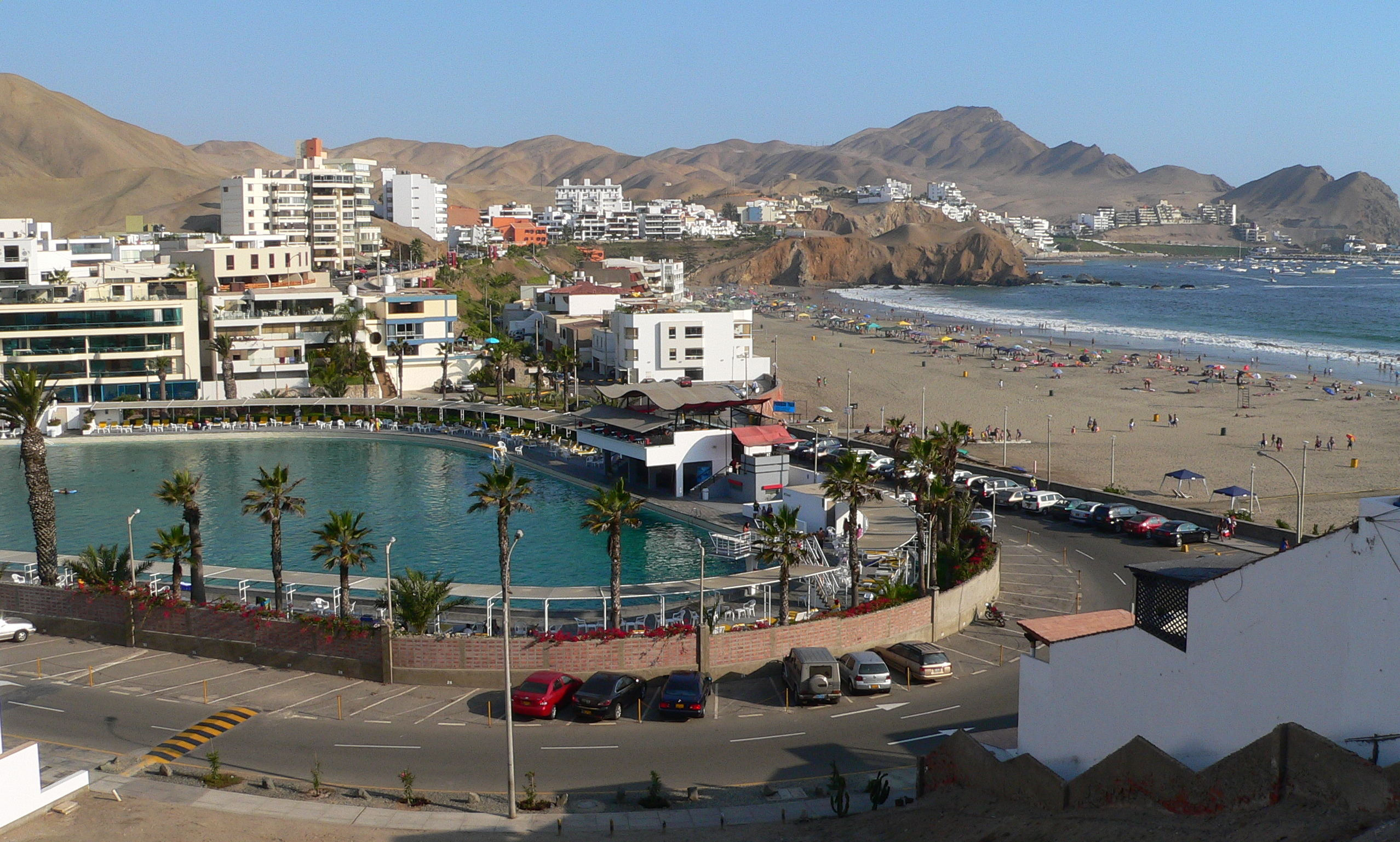
- Santa María beach

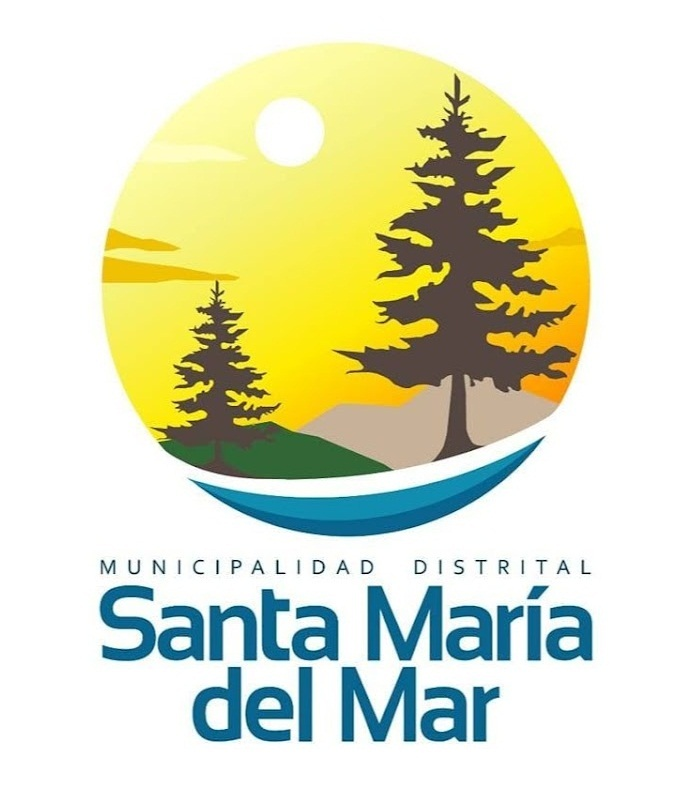
- Coat of arms
- Nickname: Capri of South America
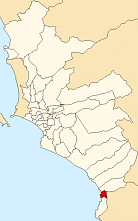
- Location of Santa María del Mar in Peru
- Coordinates: 12°25′S 76°47′W
- Country: Peru
- Department: Lima
- Province: Lima
- Founded: January 16, 1962
- Capital: Santa María del Mar

Government
  - Mayor: Alberto Monteverde

Area
  - Total: 9.81 km^{2} (3.79 sq mi)

Population (2023)
  - Total: 1,251
  - Density: 128/km^{2} (330/sq mi)
- Time zone: UTC-5 (PET)
- UBIGEO: 150138
- Website: Santa María del Mar

Santa María del Mar (Spanish: [ˌsan.ta maˈɾi.a ðel ˈmaɾ]; lit. 'Saint Mary of the Sea'), also known simply as Santa María, is a district of Lima, Peru. A seaside resort, it is known for its beaches—the most popular of which are Santa María (also known as Playa Grande) and Embajadores—and restaurants, as well as its clubs. It attracts beachgoers every summer, many of which also rent apartments during the season, considerably increasing the district's population, albeit temporarily.

== Etymology ==
The district was named by its founder, Elías Fernandini Clotet. According to his son, Elías Petrus, although the district's creation was inspired by a 1919 trip of his and his wife to a port of the same name in Cádiz, the name itself was chosen due to Fernandini's devotion to the Virgin Mary, as he was a devout Catholic.

== History ==
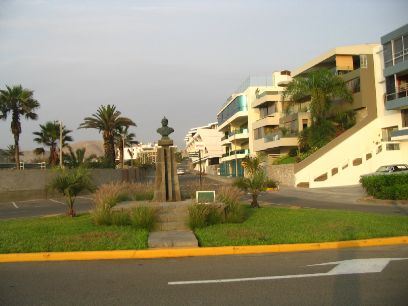
Street in Santa María del Mar

The land upon which the district was built was originally known as Curayacu–Poza de Santa María, originally an archeological site with remains dating back to the era of the Incan Empire and before. The site was visited by archeologists Frederic Engel, from Switzerland, and Bernardino Ojeda, from Peru, in the 1960s. The remains unearthed in the area were estimated to date back to 4,500 years ago and belonging to hunter-gatherer cultures who fished in the area and dried their food in the desert in order to take it to the Sierra for thousands of years. Also found in the area were ceramics, now in possession of the Centro de Investigaciones de Zonas Áridas (CIZA), and the remains of a rustic temple in the south. These newer findings are alleged to have belonged to the Yschma people, which later merged with the Incas. Supporting these claims was the discovery of a cemetery belonging to said culture during construction work in Embajadores beach. A protected area by the Ministry of Culture now exists known as Sector A.

After the success of the Chilean land campaign in Tacna and Arica during the War of the Pacific, the Chilean Army launched another land campaign in December 1880 in order to take Lima. Once the Chilean troops reached Pisco, General Manuel Baquedano split his troops into two groups: one part headed for Lurín Valley, and the other would continue north toward Lima. The latter reached Curayacu on December 24 of the same year, establishing a campsite in the Santa María area the day after and later leaving for Lurín. This was accomplished due to the Peruvians' lack of knowledge of the area, which the Chileans took advantage of. As a result, over 19,000 soldiers disembarked on Embajadores beach.

In the decades following the war, the area of Santa María—then part of Chilca—became known as the caletita used by the Chileans to reach Lima, being described as such in Germán Stiglich's 1922 Geographic Dictionary of Peru. The name given to the caleta by local fishermen as a result of the association to the 1880 landing, "Caleta de los chilenos" (Caleta of the Chileans), was bastardised into "Caleta de los chilcanos" (Caleta of the Chilca locals).

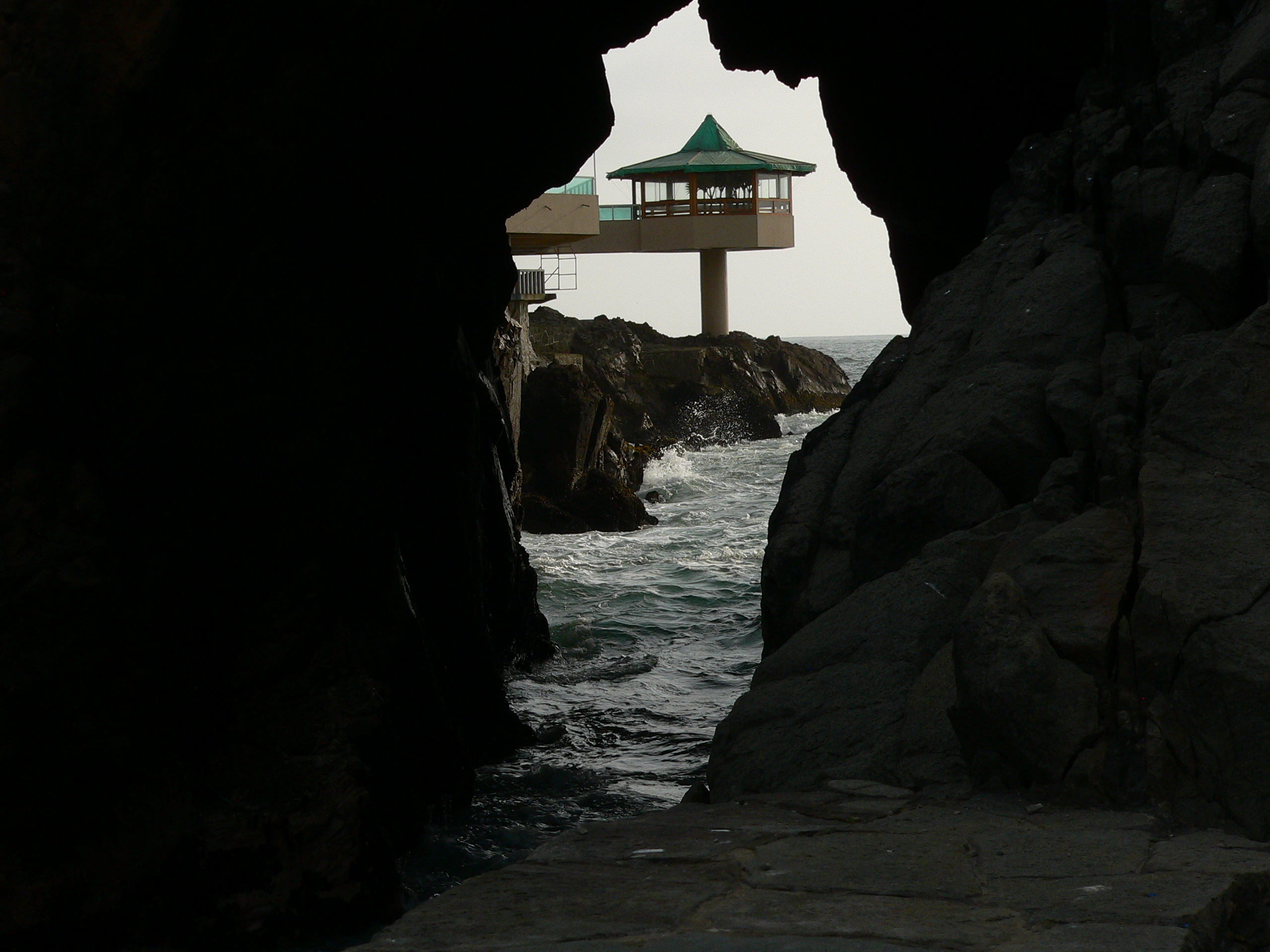
Part of house in Santa María del Mar

The area, by now part of San Bartolo District, was the focus of two concessions, with the first one taking place on January 30, 1943, granted by the Ministry of the Navy to Luis Debernardi Dávila for 10 years, concerning what was known as a 25 ha area in Posa de Santa María beach to be used for fish farming. The second took place on June 13, 1943, granted by the Ministry of Development to architect Fernando Belaúnde Terry in order to establish a balneario in the area. both concessions were transferred to Elías and Eugelio Fernandini Clotet on October 18, 1945, with one being reworked to include the development of a yacht club and the use of the beaches to promote fishing and maritime sports.

In 1950, Elías Fernandini brought a pine seed from France and planted it in the entrance of the district (it later died in late 2022). The species (A. excelsa) is native to Norfolk Island and over 400 trees of the same type adorn the district. 8 years later, Walter Weberhofer, a Peruvian architect of Austrian descent won a contest to begin the development of a yacht club, which later came to be known as Club Esmeralda. Weberhofer's work was later called by the American National Association of Home Builders as the "Capri of South America".

The area soon became the birthplace of the local jet set culture, with locals from Lima visiting or establishing themselves in the district. International visitors were also attracted, with visitors that included then Prince of Spain, Juan Carlos I.

The district's first mayor was Aurelio Yrigoyen Rodrigo, whose tenure started in 1962. He was succeeded by 5 other mayors up until 2011, and 3 more since then.

=== Recent history ===
In 2020, a bust of Miguel Grau and the nautical chart of Santa María was unveiled in the district. In 2021, a 6 × 1.6 cm Chilean Bachmann-type cartridge dating back to the War of the Pacific was found in Embajadores beach.

On September 28, 2023, the Congress of Peru was awarded a 35,133.05 m^{2} terrain by the National Superintendence of State Assets on the district, to be used as a "Parliamentary Training and Studies Centre" at a total cost of over S/. 17 million and an estimated completion date of December 31, 2025. The news of the high-end facility's intended features and cost, as well as possible damages to the Inca road system, attracted criticism from a number of congressmen and the press.

== Politics ==
Santa María del Mar is under the jurisdiction of its own district municipality, as well as that of the Metropolitan Municipality of Lima.

=== List of mayors ===
Since 2023, the incumbent mayor is Hugo Monteverde.

№	Mayor	Party	Term	
№	Mayor	Party	Begin	End
1	Aurelio Yrigoyen Rodrigo	—N/a	1964	1966
2	Mercedes Flores de Lercari	Unión Cívica	1967	1969
1969–1980: No elections
3	Mercedes Flores de Lercari	Lista Independiente No. 3	1981	1983
3	Mercedes Flores de Lercari	Lista Independiente No. 5	1984	1986
4	Alfredo Arozemena Ferreyros	APRA	1987	1989
5	José Fernández Montagne	FREDEMO	1990	1992
5	José Fernández Montagne	Unidad Vecinal Santa María	1993	1995
5	José Fernández Montagne	Cambio 90–Nueva Mayoría	1996	1998
5	José Fernández Montagne	Vamos Vecino	1999	2002
6	Ángel Abugattás Nazal	Lista N° 12 "Por Santa María"	2007	
6	Ángel Abugattás Nazal	APRA	2007	2010
7	Viviana Roda Scheuch	Acción Popular	2011	2014
8	Marwan Kahhat Abedrabbo	Perú Patria Segura	2015	2018
9	Jiries Jamis Sumar	Restauración Nacional	2019	2022
10	Hugo Monteverde Cerrutti	Acción Popular	2022	Incumbent

== Geography ==
Santa María del Mar is part of Lima's Cono Sur, an unofficial subregion of the city.

=== Boundaries ===
The district is bordered by the Pacific Ocean to the west, by San Bartolo to the north, by Chilca District to the east, and by Pucusana District to the south.

== Demographics ==
=== Crime ===
In 2024, the district reported no major crimes from January to March.

== See also ==
- Administrative divisions of Peru
- Casa Fernandini, Santa María del Mar
