= Santiago David Távara =

Peruvian journalist (born 1965)

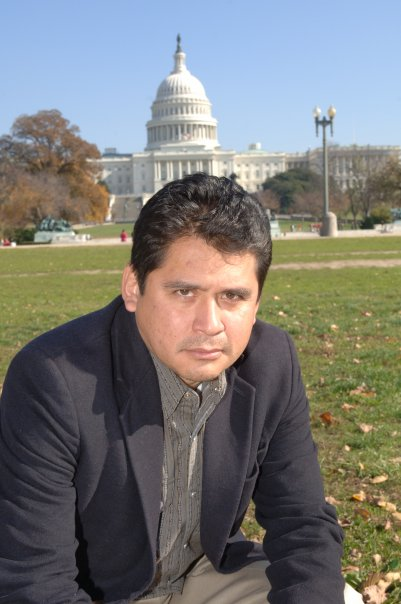
- Távara in 2007
- Born: Santiago David Távara; April 17, 1965 (age 61); Ventanilla, Peru
- Occupation: Journalist

Santiago David Távara (born April 17, 1965) is a Peruvian-American journalist and author. He lives in the Washington, D.C. area. For more than two decades, Távara has covered local news stories in the Washington, D.C., area as well as cultural, sports, economic, social, national, and international issues.

He has specialized in topics which affect the Hispanic community such as immigration, business, health, and demographics. He has also been assigned to cover national and international issues in the White House, the U.S. Congress, the State Department, the Organization of American States, the IMF, and the World Bank.

== Journalistic career ==
=== Washington Post ===
Távara began his journalism career in the United States in 2000 when he served as a reporter for the Washington Post newspaper in Washington, D.C.

=== Notimex ===
In 2003 Távara was hired by Notimex, the official Mexican news agency, to cover national and international issues in the White House, the U.S. Congress.

=== Metro Latino ===
Took the position as an Editor/Reporter at Medio Latino, specialized in the Hispanic community source: immigration, business, health, and demographics

=== CIP Americas Program ===
Collaborator with Center for International Policy Americas Program

== Career timeline ==
- 2000–2003 Reporter Washington Post in Washington, D.C.
- 2003–2013 Correspondent Notimex in Washington, D.C.
- 2013–2015 Editor/Reporter at Metro Latino in Washington, D.C.
- 2015– Now Editor at Metro Latino in Washington, D.C.

== Author ==
Távara is the author of the book Obama, el duro no se pudo.
