= Olivia Bisa Tirko =

Amazonian environmental activist

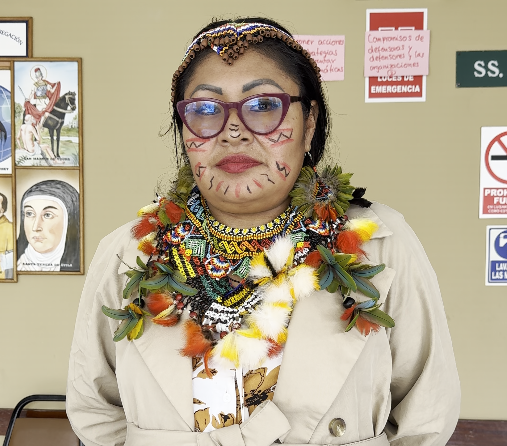
- Born: c.1985 (age 40–41); Peru
- Occupations: Sociologist; environmental activist
- Years active: 2020–present
- Known for: Environmental activism in the Amazon rainforest
- Title: President, Autonomous Territorial Government of the Chapra Nation
- Awards: Global Award for Environmental and Climate Justice (2025); Courageous Scientists Award (2025)
- Children: 2

Olivia Bisa Tirko (born c. 1985, in Peru) is an Indigenous Peruvian environmental activist who is known for her campaigns against oil exploitation in the Amazon rainforest. In 2020, she became the first female president of the Autonomous Territorial Government of the Chapra Nation (GTANCH), located in the province of Datem del Marañón in the Department of Loreto, Peru. In 2025, in recognition of her defense of her territory against oil activity, Tirko won the Global Award for Environmental and Climate Justice for Latin America, awarded by the Forum Eco-Social Transformations.

== Environmental activism ==
In September 2022, an oil spill occurred at the 177-kilometre (110 mi) mark on the North Peruvian Pipeline, operated by Petroperú. The oil spill and subsequent slicks contaminated rivers, affecting fishing and food sources for Chapra communities. Bisa Tirko demanded that the state and oil companies remedy the environmental damage and questioned the hiring of remediation companies due to their alleged history of non-compliance in the management of toxic waste. In November 2025, she attended COP 2025 to represent her Amazonian territory and its environmental demands.

== Reports of threats ==
Since taking office as Chapra Nation territory president, the defender denounced the growing presence of drug traffickers, illegal loggers, and pollution caused by oil spills. Bisa Tirko received multiple threats and was included on national lists of indigenous defenders at high risk.

In 2022, following the Petroperú oil spill, in the Provincial Criminal Prosecutor's Office of Datem del Marañón – San Lorenzo, Petroperú filed four criminal complaints against Bisa Tirko for the alleged crimes of concealment, kidnapping, and endangering public safety; that were all dismissed in March 2023. Bisa Tirko reported that she was the victim of threats, harassment, and psychological violence against her and her children, including via telephone calls and strangers visiting her home.

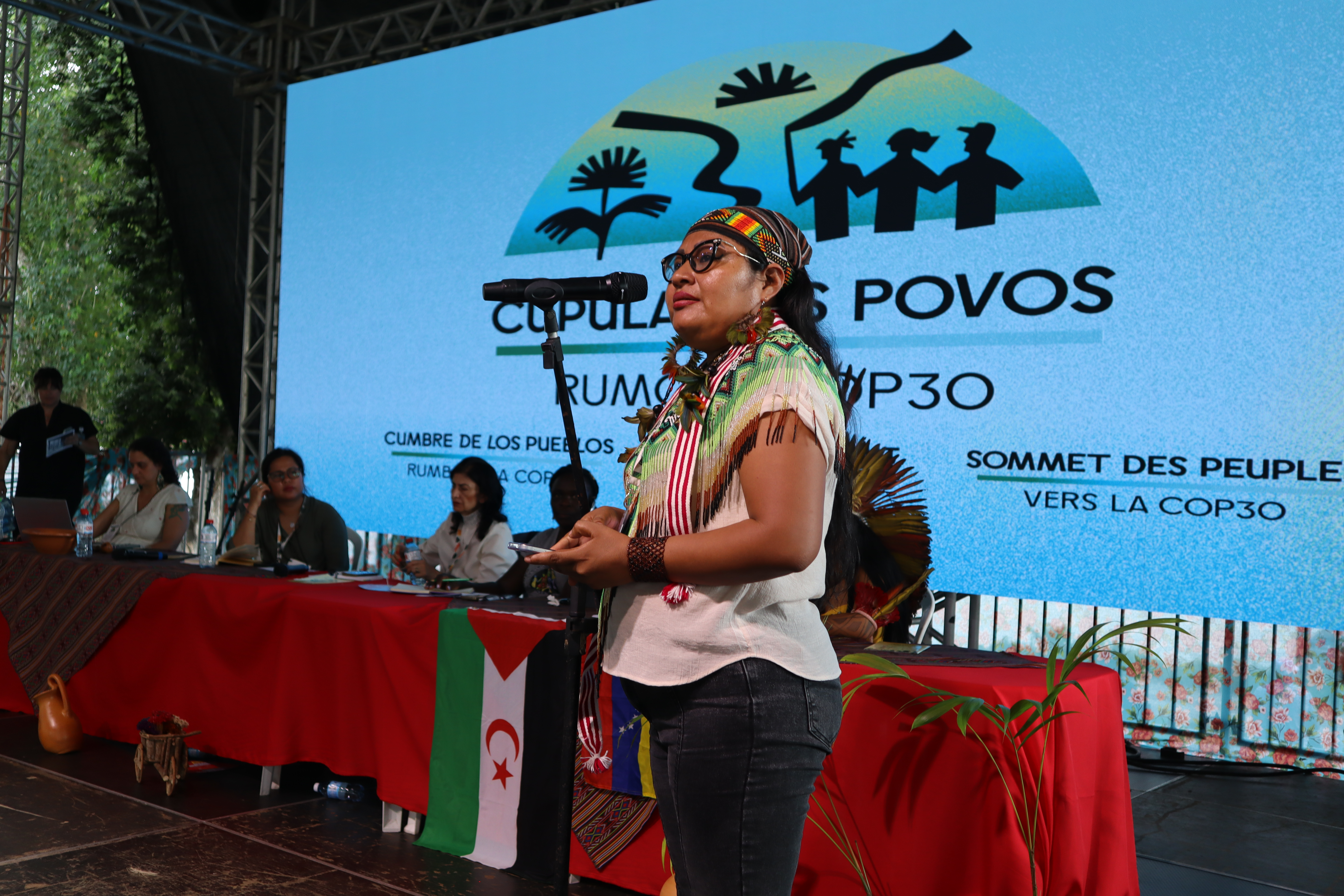
Bisa Tirko in Belém, Brazil, 2025

In 2024, Mary Lawlord, the U.N. special rapporteur on the Situation of Human Rights Defenders, warned that Bisa Tirko was at high right and she left her community on several occasions.

== Recognition ==
In 2025, Bisa Tirko received the Global Award for Environmental and Climate Justice for her activism against oil exploitation in the Amazon. Awarded by the Vienna-based Forum Eco-Social Transformations, an organization dedicated to raising awareness of environmental activism where conservation is at permanent risk, Bisa Tirko won the awarded following a global selection process involving 22 candidates. In the same year, she was one of five people awarded the Courageous Scientists Award.

== See also ==
- Environmental issues in Peru
- Máxima Acuña
- Maria Luz Canaquiri
