= San Jerónimo de Tunán District =

Coordinates: 11.9492°S 75.2844°W

San Jerónimo de Tunán Tunan
- District
- Interactive map of San Jerónimo de Tunán
- Country: Peru
- Region: Junín
- Province: Huancayo
- Founded: October 5, 1854
- Capital: San Jerónimo de Tunán

Government
  - Mayor: Wilfredo Severo León Suazo

Area
  - Total: 20.99 km^{2} (8.10 sq mi)
- Elevation: 3,274 m (10,741 ft)

Population (2005 census)
  - Total: 9,161
  - Density: 436.4/km^{2} (1,130/sq mi)
- Time zone: UTC-5 (PET)
- UBIGEO: 120130

San Jerónimo de Tunán District is one of twenty-eight districts of the province Huancayo in Peru.
