= Casa Fernandini, Santa María del Mar =

Landmark in Lima, Peru

Coordinates: 12°24′36″S 76°46′51″W

Casa Fernandini
- Interactive map of the Casa Fernandini area

General information
- Architectural style: Modernist
- Year built: 1957–1958

Technical details
- Floor count: 2

Design and construction
- Architect: Walter Weberhofer

The Casa Fernandini is a building designed by architect Walter Weberhofer. It was built between 1957 and 1958 in the district of Santa María del Mar, south of Lima. It is named after its owner, Anita Fernandini de Naranjo.

== History ==
The house is built on a bed of rocks on a coastal cliff in the seaside district of Santa María del Mar. The design causes these rocks to be incorporated into the reinforced concrete structure.

The house is born from the rock and opens towards the view, projecting horizontal lines that generate terraces, eaves and a large roof that breaks to capture views and lighting. This design ends with a long terrace-balcony that overlooks the lower terraces and the sea. The white roof ends in an eave of beams that gives it a dynamic character as it breaks, raising the ends, one towards the views, and the other towards the topography. Then it opens, generating the different terraces that move along the axis.

The routes of this house are made through stairs. One snail-shaped on the inside and others that adapt to the terrain on the outside. The services are organized towards the back of the house, close to the rocks, and the living spaces, such as the bedrooms, living room and dining room, are towards the front and have a clear view of the sea. One of the bedrooms is cut into the rock and has a view, through it, to the other side of the bay.

== See also ==
- Embassy of Russia, Lima, also owned by Fernandini de Naranjo until 1970.
