= La Pampilla refinery =

Oil refinery in Peru

Coordinates: 11.919°S 77.131°W

La Pampilla Refinery
- Country: Peru
- Region: Callao
- Location: Ventanilla
- Operator: Grupo Repsol del Perú S.A.C.

Field history
- Start of development: 1967

Production
- Current production of oil: 117.000 barrels per day (~5,830 t/a)
- Year of current production of oil: 2020

La Pampilla refinery is an oil refinery in Peru, under the administration of Grupo Repsol del Perú S.A.C. It is located on Néstor Gambetta Avenue in Ventanilla, Callao, and has a capacity to refine 117,000 barrels of oil per day, which represents half of the country's refining production.

== History ==
The construction of the refinery was put out to tender in 1964 and inaugurated in 1967, built by Temach Co. In 1996, the refinery became part of Repsol for around 180 million dollars, as part of the privatisation process carried out by former president Alberto Fujimori.

In 2014, the modernisation of the refinery began, estimated at US$740 million. It was expected that modernization would reduce the oil's sulfur content to 50 ppm by 2016 as well as the improvement of other fuels by 2018.

=== Oil spill ===
On January 15, 2022, while crude oil was being unloaded at the refinery, an oil spill of an estimated 6,000 barrels occurred on the Mar de Grau. It significantly affected flora and fauna and was considered the largest ecological disaster to occur on the Peruvian coast.

The refinery and its owner, Repsol, have been harshly criticised for the cleaning and decontamination work carried out after the spill, reflecting the lack of a contingency plan for possible disasters.

The government responded by stopping activities in terminal No. 2 of the refinery and imposing a fine of 33.4 million dollars.

== See also ==
- Talara Refinery
- Petroperú
