= Cine Tauro =

Former cinema in Peru

Coordinates: 12.0506°S 77.0401°W

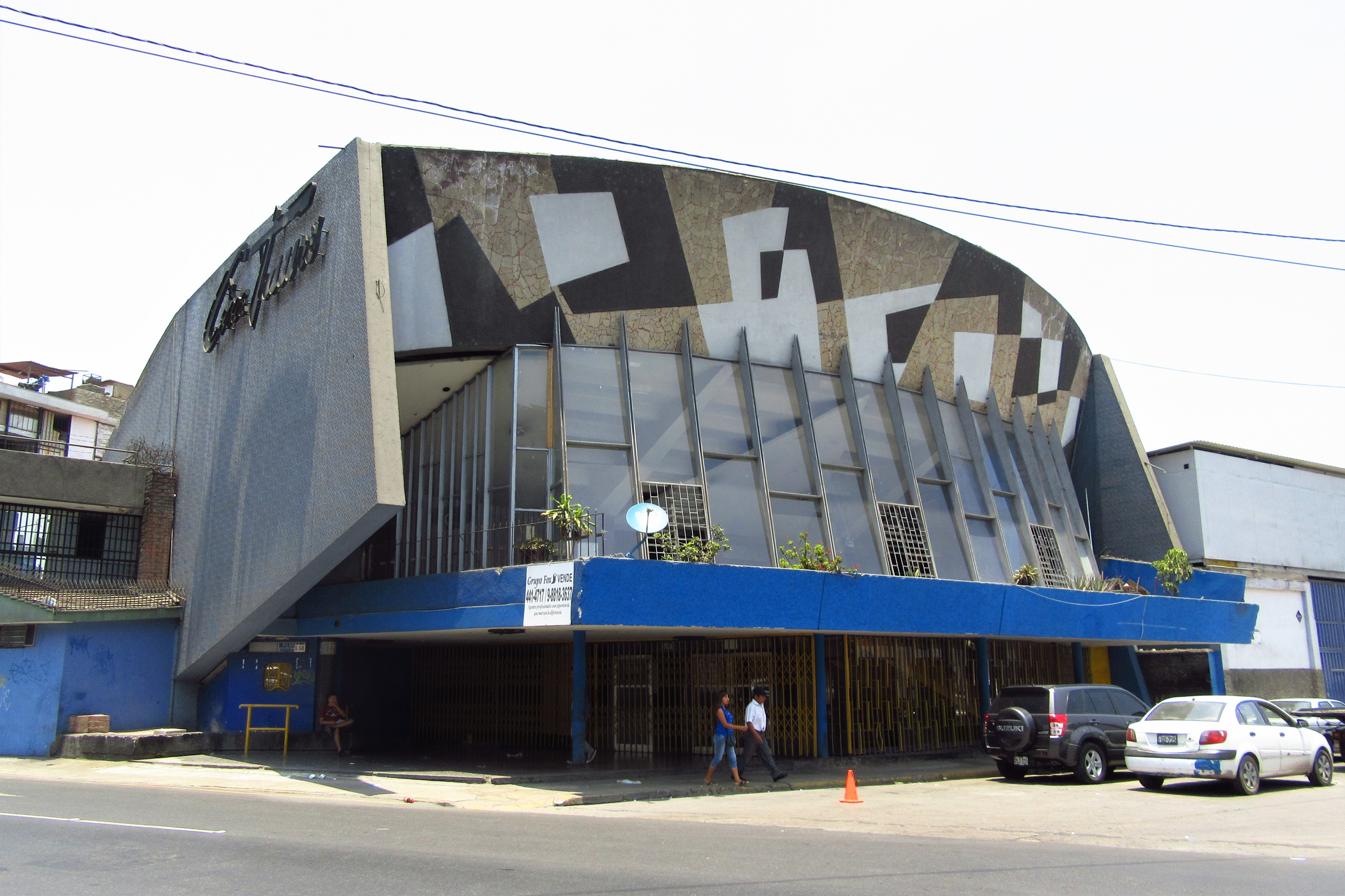
- The building in 2017

General information
- Architectural style: Modern
- Year(s) built: 1957–1959
- Inaugurated: April 5, 1960

Design and construction
- Architect(s): Walter Weberhofer

The Cine Tauro is a defunct movie theatre built in 1959 by Peruvian architect Walter Weberhofer. The building is located in the district of Lima. Since the 1990s, the theatre has started showing pornographic films and has been temporarily closed on several occasions.

== History ==
The original project was called the Cine Washington after the street it was located in. Construction began in 1957 and ended in 1959. It opened on April 5, 1960, with the screening of the film Pillow Talk, starring Rock Hudson and Doris Day. During the first two decades of operation, the establishment was one of the most modern and popular cinemas in the capital. The capacity of more than 1,000 seats made it unprofitable, so it was thought to divide it into small rooms, but it turned out to be impossible. It went into decline with the economic crisis of the 1980s. However, it was used by artists of the time as a concert hall.

In the 1990s it became an adult film exhibition hall, until 2004 when it was temporarily closed. In 2012, the investigative journalistic television program Panorama aired a report on male prostitution that took place in the cinema. In 2019 it was closed again, and a fine was imposed on the company that owned the business. The following year, in 2020, during the COVID-19 pandemic, the police intervened in the premises due to the celebration of a party prohibited by the confinement decreed by the Peruvian government. In February 2022, after complaints of holding illegal parties, and because female and male prostitution activity was detected, a new closure was carried out by agents of the Municipality of Lima.

Subsequently, some transnational companies attempted to recover it, but the environment was not suitable for the cultural or office rental projects that were planned.

== Overview ==
Designed in a modern style by Peruvian architect Walter Weberhofer, the original project envisioned a mixed complex comprising a ten-story office building and an entertainment center with a movie theatre. Of the original project, only three commercial floors plus the basement were finally built. The movie theatre has a façade with large windows that faces a triangular plaza at the intersection of Washington and Delgado streets. The neon sign with the name of the establishment was also emblematic.

The interior of the cinema has a covered hall that distributes the space, with oval columns that facilitate transit to the box office area and entrance to the room, which was done through the main level or through the curved staircase to connect with the stalls and mezzanine. Its capacity is 720 seats on the ground floor, and 560 seats on the mezzanine. The projector used supported 70mm films.

== See also ==
- Cinema of Peru
