= World Cup All Stars =

American all-star cheerleading program

- Sport: All-Star Cheerleading
- Founded: 1994 by Elaine Pascale and Joelle Antico
- Based in: Freehold, New Jersey, Kansas City, Missouri, Olyphant, Pennsylvania and Easton, Pennsylvania
- Colors: Gold and Black
- Owner: Elaine Pascale & Joelle Antico
- Head coaches: Elana Cohen, Cat Sabo, Staci Sprague, Stephanie Bunis, Katie Wisniewski, Kenny Wisniewsky, Denise Maldonado, Angel De Jesus, Chrissy Schneiweiss, Kevin Baron, Lynn Alfano, Jordan Cetnar, Sami Cetnar, Richard Battle-Baxter, Susan Fischer, Tiy Fountain, Mark Mazzuchelli, Rommel Osuna, Ashley Troiano, Colin Menendez, Alana O'Handley, Ryan Page, Matt Parkey, Joe Sorensen, Emilie Holloway, Eric Charles-Gallo Louis Charles-Gallo, Staci Hites, Jessica Cline, Jerome Asbury, Kayla (kk) Banton, Jasmine Banton, Jerray Johnson
- Championships: 8x USASF Cheerleading Worlds Champions, 14x USASF Cheerleading Worlds Medalists, 16x NCA All Star National Champions, 3x The Majors Champions, as well as many other national level wins and grand championship titles.
- No. of teams: 39

World Cup All Stars, founded by Elaine Pascale and Joelle Antico, is home to the 2007, 2008, 2009, 2015, 2017, and 2019 USASF Cheerleading Worlds champions in the Large Senior All Girl division, the World Cup Shooting Stars. In the International Junior All Girl division, the World Cup Starlites are the 2007 and 2008 World Champions. World Cup was founded in 1994 in Freehold, New Jersey by owner Elaine Pascale and her daughter Joelle Antico. World Cup is one of the most respected all-star programs in the U.S.

== History ==
World Cup grew out of the Pop Warner success of mother–daughter team Elaine Pascale and Joelle Antico. For many years, Pascale served as coach of the local Pop Warner team that Antico had joined. Eventually, the family moved to Freehold, New Jersey, where Pascale found herself coaching a Pop Warner midget squad. By this time Antico was attending Penn State and would come home on weekends to assist her mother with the team. In 1992, the pair won their first Pop Warner National Championship. The transition from Pop Warner to all stars was not a big leap for Pascale and Antico. After the national win and with the Pop Warner season over, a small group of their students and parents persuaded them to start a competition squad, and the World Cup All Stars were born.

World Cup All Stars officially began in 1994. The first team formed was the Shooting Stars. In 1995 World Cup won its very first national championship. From that point, the team from World Cup has won numerous national championships from NCA, Spirit Sports, Americheer, WSF and many other companies. Most recently, winning 2015 IASF Cheerleading Worlds in the Large Senior All Girl division and earning the bronze in the International Junior division. Both the Large Senior All Girl (Shooting Stars) and International Junior All Girl (Starlites) are back-to-back world champions, winning in both 2007 and 2008. Also in 2008, World Cup's Large Senior Limited Coed Team (Odyssey) received 3rd place at the Cheerleading Worlds. One of their other well known teams is the Twinkles. They are a youth level 5 team composed of girls ages 8–12 who compete many of the same advanced stunt and tumbling skills as the teams composed of much older athletes. This team has won the NCA National Championship five times recently, in 2011, 2012, 2014, 2015, and 2017. Both in 2012 and 2014, Twinkles finished the season undefeated. Starlites won NCA in 2011, 2014, and 2015. Cosmic Rays won NCA in 2012. The Shooting Stars have won NCA eight times in 2000, 2001, 2002, 2004, 2010, 2011, 2012, and 2016. World Cup has had multiple teams competing in the Cheerleading Worlds for years. In 2014, they have received 4 full paid bids to attend Worlds, one for each of their Worlds eligible teams. World Cup didn't win any world Championships from 2009-2014, though Shooting Stars still medaled in Large Senior each year. In 2015 Shooting Stars won World Cup's 6th and the team's 4th World Championship title in 6 years in the Large Senior All Girl Level 5 division! This broke a tie the team held with Cheer Extreme Allstars Senior Elite for winning the most times in the division; previously both held 3 titles respectively. In 2014 World Cup Allstars acquired two Pennsylvania based cheer gyms, Keystone Extreme and Rocket Elite, that will henceforth be known as World Cup Genesis and World Cup Phoenix respectively. Both gyms will have Worlds teams this 2014-2015 season.

In 2008, American Cheerleader Magazine ranked World Cup the 2nd "Top All Star Program" in the country.

== World Championship Placements 2006-2024 ==
2006	Place	Division
Shooting Stars	4th	Large Senior All Girl
Odyssey	6th	Small Senior Coed

2007	Place	Division
Starlites	1st	International Junior All Girl
Shooting Stars	1st	Large Senior All Girl
Odyssey	5th	Small Senior Coed

2008	Place	Division
Starlites	1st	International Junior All Girl
Shooting Stars	1st	Large Senior All Girl
Odyssey	3rd	Large Senior Limited Coed

2009	Place	Division
Starlites	3rd	International Junior All Girl
Shooting Stars	1st	Large Senior All Girl
Odyssey		Large Senior Limited Coed

2010	Place	Division
Starlites	2nd	International Junior All Girl
Shooting Stars	2nd	Large Senior All Girl
Odyssey		Large Senior Limited Coed

2011	Place	Division
Shooting Stars	2nd	Large Senior All Girl
Odyssey	7th	Large Senior Limited Coed
Suns	17th	Small Senior All Girl

2012	Place	Division
Shooting Stars	3rd	Large Senior All Girl
Odyssey	7th	Medium Senior Coed
Suns	4th	Medium Senior All Girl

2013	Place	Division
Shooting Stars	3rd	Large Senior All Girl
Odyssey	9th	Medium Senior Coed
Suns	19th	Small Senior All Girl

2014	Place	Division
Shooting Stars	2nd	Large Senior All Girl
Odyssey	5th	Medium Senior Coed
Suns	5th	Medium Senior All Girl
Omni	8th	Small Senior Coed

2015	Place	Division
Shooting Stars	1st	Large Senior All Girl
Odyssey	7th	Medium Senior Coed
Zenith	16th	Medium Senior All Girl
Omni	30th	Small Senior Coed
Suns	7th	Small Senior All Girl
Blackout	16th (P)	Small Senior All Girl

2016	Place	Division
Shooting Stars	4th	Large Senior All Girl
Odyssey	14th	Medium Senior Coed
Zenith	19th (SF)	Medium Senior All Girl
Omni	14 (SF)	Small Senior Coed
Suns	18th (SF)	Small Senior All Girl
Blackout	18th (P)	Small Senior All Girl

2017	Place	Division
Shooting Stars	1st	Large Senior All Girl
Odyssey	8th	Small Senior Coed
Zenith	17th (SF)	Medium Senior All Girl
Omni	7th	Medium Senior Coed
Suns	9th	Medium Senior All Girl
Blackout	17th (SF)	Small Senior All Girl

2018	Place	Division
Shooting Stars	2nd	Large Senior All Girl
Suns	8th	Medium Senior All Girl

2019	Place	Division
Shooting Stars	1st	Large Senior All Girl
Suns	5th	Medium Senior All Girl
Zenith	7th	Open Senior All Girl
Odyssey	5th	Medium Senior Coed

2021	Place	Division
Shooting Stars	3rd	Large Senior All Girl
Suns	6th	Medium Senior All Girl
Zenith	10th	Medium Senior All Girl
Odyssey	6th	Small Senior Coed

2022	Place	Division
Shooting Stars	2nd	Large Senior 6
Suns	7th	Medium Senior 6
Odyssey	7th	Small Senior Coed 6

2023	Place	Division
Shooting Stars	4th	Large Senior 6
Odyssey	6th	Extra Small Senior Coed 6
Omni	1st	U18 NT Coed 6

2024	Place	Division
Shooting Stars	3rd	Large Senior 6
Odyssey	9th	Extra Small Senior 6
Omni	3rd	U18 NT Coed 6
NepTune	11th (P)	U18 NT Coed 6

P: Prelims SF: Semi-Finals

	Year	Team	Place	Division
1st place, gold medalist(s)	2007	Starlites	1st place	International Junior 5
1st place, gold medalist(s)	2007	Shooting Stars	1st place	Large Senior
3rd place, bronze medalist(s)	2008	Odyesey	3rd place	Large Senior Coed
1st place, gold medalist(s)	2008	Shooting Stars	1st place	Large Senior 5
1st place, gold medalist(s)	2008	Starlites	1st place	International Junior 5
1st place, gold medalist(s)	2009	Shooting Stars	1st place	Large Senior 5
3rd place, bronze medalist(s)	2009	Starlites	3rd Place	International Junior 5
2nd place, silver medalist(s)	2010	Shooting stars	2nd place	Large Senior 5
2nd place, silver medalist(s)	2010	Starlites	2nd place	International Junior 5
2nd place, silver medalist(s)	2011	Shooting stars	2nd place	Large Senior 5
3rd place, bronze medalist(s)	2012	Shooting Stars	3rd Place	Large Senior 5 5
3rd place, bronze medalist(s)	2013	Shooting Stars	3rd Place	Large Senior 5 5
2nd place, silver medalist(s)	2014	Shooting stars	2nd place	Large Senior 5
1st place, gold medalist(s)	2015	Shooting Stars	1st place	Large Senior 5
1st place, gold medalist(s)	2017	Shooting Stars	1st place	Large Senior 5
2nd place, silver medalist(s)	2018	Shooting Stars	2nd place	Large Senior 5
1st place, gold medalist(s)	2019	Shooting Stars	1st place	Large Senior 5
3rd place, bronze medalist(s)	2021	Shooting Stars	3rd Place	Large Senior All Girl
2nd place, silver medalist(s)	2022	Shooting Stars	2nd Place	Large Senior 6
1st place, gold medalist(s)	2023	Omni	1st place	U18 NT Coed 6
3rd place, bronze medalist(s)	2024	Shooting Stars	3rd Place	Large Senior 6
3rd place, bronze medalist(s)	2024	Omni	3rd place	U18 NT Coed 6

== Publicity ==
World Cup All Stars has received a considerable amount of publicity, and has been in various media. They were featured in a 2004 and 2005 performance at the Career Transition for Dancers gala, performing alongside Toni Basil, Bette Midler, Patti LaBelle and Liza Minnelli. As a result of the performance with Toni Basil of her hit "Mickey", she named the Shooting Stars the official Mickey cheerleaders. They have also been featured in Time Magazine, the New York Times, American Cheerleader Magazine, All-star Cheer Magazine, Inside Cheerleading Magazine, and Cheer Coach & Advisor. In 2009, the Shooting Stars were invited to act as the Glee Cheerleaders at the Glee NYC premiere party. in 2012, the World Cup Twinkles (Youth Level 5) had their own 1-hour documentary and media companion called Twinkles Chasing Perfection produced by The Star Ledger.

== Teams ==
Special Athlete	Location
Super Stars	Freehold
Sparks	Kansas City
Special Stars	Easton
Fire	Scranton

Level 1 Teams	Division	Location
Starlettes	Tiny 1	Olyphant
Twilights	Tiny Prep 1	Freehold
Little Craters	Tiny prep 1	Kansas City
Mission	jr 1	Lancaster
Unknown Name	Tiny 1	Easton
Supernovas	Small Mini 1	Freehold
Gravity	Youth 1	Easton
Orbit	Youth 1	Kansas City
Luna	Junior 1	Olyphant
Meteors	Small Youth 1	Freehold
Shimmer	U17 1	Kansas City

Level 2 Teams	Division	Location
revolution	jr 2	lancaster
Stardust	Youth 2	Easton
Milkyways	Youth 2	Freehold
Starbrites	Junior 2.1	Freehold
Moonbeams	Junior 2	Freehold
Eclipse	Large Junior 2	Freehold
Solar Flare	U17 2	Kansas City
Zodiac	Senior 2	Olyphant
Infinity	Senior 2	Freehold

Level 3 Teams	Division	Location
ozone	jr 3	Lancaster
Little Dippers	Large Youth 3	Freehold
Equinox	Small Junior 3	Easton
Supersonics	Large Junior 3	Freehold
G-Force	U17 3	Kansas City
Omega	Small Senior 3	Olyphant
Electra	Large Senior 3	Freehold
Starstruck	Large Senior 3	Freehold
Aries	Large Senior 3	Freehold
Gemini	Large Senior Coed 3	Freehold
Satellite Gold	Junior prep 3.2	Freehold
Satellite Black	Senior prep 3.2	Freehold

Level 4 Teams	Division	Location
Starburst	Large Junior 4	Freehold
Apollo	Large Senior Coed 4.2	Easton
Galaxy	Large Senior 4	Freehold
Infinity	Junior 4.2	Freehold
Rockets	Medium Senior Coed 4	Easton

Level 5 Teams	Division	Location
Twinkles	Youth 5	Freehold
Comets	Small Senior 5	Easton
Cosmic Rays Black	Large Senior 5 Coed	Freehold
Cosmic Rays Gold	Small All Girl 5	Freehold

Level 6 Teams	Division	Location
Starlites	Large Junior Coed 6	Freehold
Blackout	Small Senior 6	Olyphant
Suns	Medium Senior 6	Freehold
Omni	U18 Non-tumble Coed 6	Freehold
Zenith	Medium Senior 6	Easton
Odyssey	Small Senior Coed 6	Freehold
Shooting Stars	Large Senior 6	Freehold
Titans	Open Non-tumble 6	Kansas City
