= The Cheerleading Worlds =

International cheerleading competition

Tournament information
- Sport: Cheerleading
- Location: Orlando, Florida
- Established: 2004
- Teams: 500+
- Website: https://thecheerleadingworlds.net

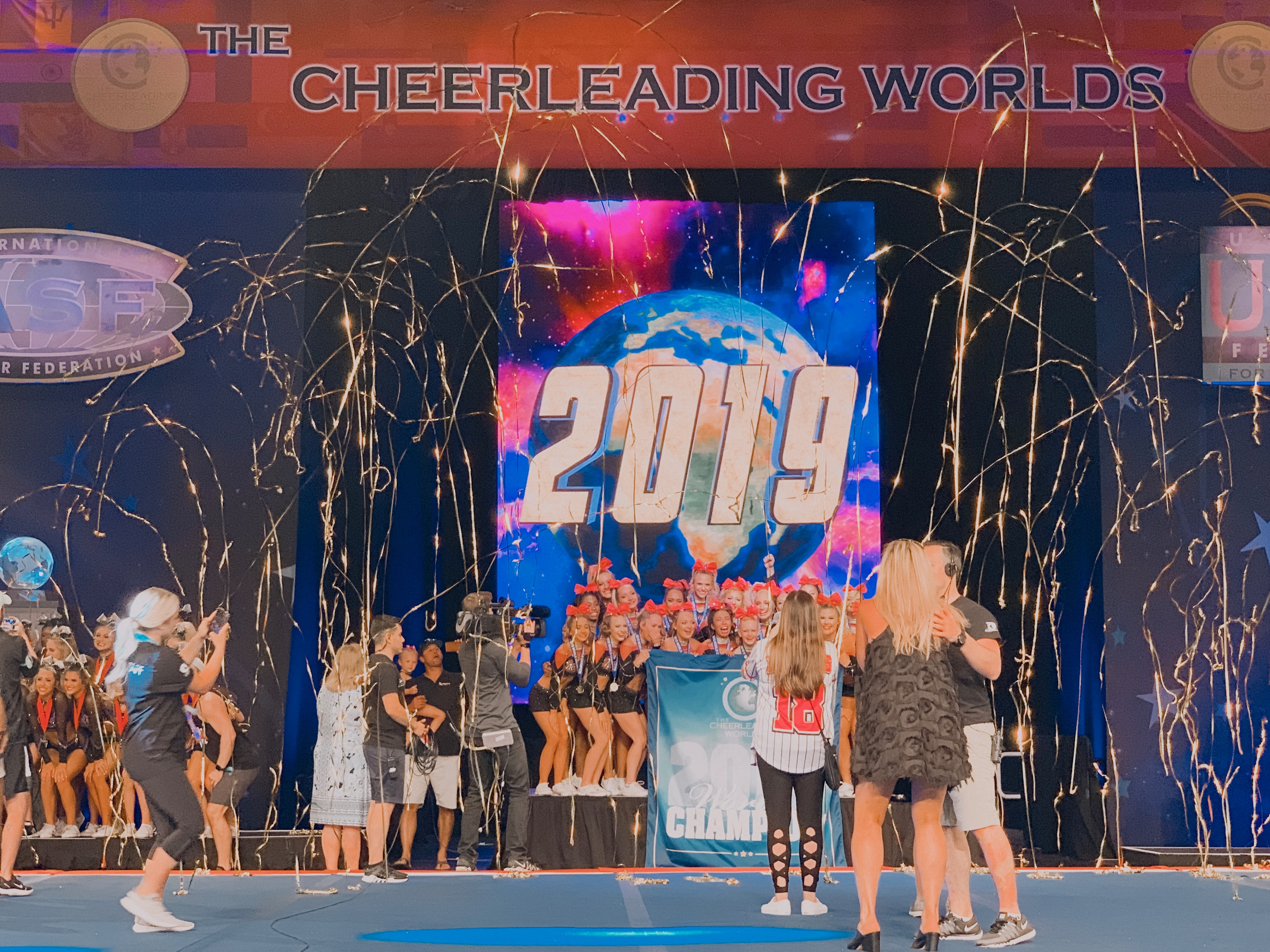
Infinity Allstars Royals from a gym in Jacksonville, Florida, winning Gold, 2019

The Cheerleading Worlds, or Cheerleading World Championships, colloquially known as "Worlds", is an annual international championship event for competitive cheerleading held in the United States hosted by the U.S. All Star Federation in partnership with the International All Star Federation (IASF) (the global organization of professionals and athletes involved in a club or All Star Cheer). Teams from around the world annual to receive a bid to go on and compete in Orlando, Florida, at the ESPN Wide World of Sports.

The event is typically held across a three-day span in April or May, featuring preliminary competitions, semi-finals and finals. Only level 5, 6 and 7 cheerleading teams with bids from regional and national competitions are eligible to participate, being offered a "paid" bid covering all expenses up to $25,000, or an "at-large" bid which does not cover any costs. Around 9,000 athletes from around 40 countries compete annually, with routines being judged on difficulty, execution, creativity and overall composition. The top teams from each round advance, with the winners in each of the 22 divisions receiving championship rings.

From 2007 onwards, The Dance Worlds began concurrently as a sub-event of The Cheerleading Worlds. Like the Cheerleading Worlds, this event is also an invite-only event hosted by the USASF in collaboration with the IASF, showcasing elite dancers from around the world in styles such as hip hop, jazz, pom, kick, contemporary and lyrical.

In 2025, 270 US dance teams and 116 international dance teams, made up of 2,593 dancers from 18 countries, participated in the Dance Worlds. Additionally, 277 US cheerleading teams and 237 international cheerleading teams, made up of 11,327 cheerleaders from 24 countries, participated in The Cheerleading Worlds.

== Bids ==
Both The Cheerleading Worlds and The Dance Worlds are invite-only events, with teams required to win bids in order to qualify to compete.

Three types of bids are available: "paid" and "at-large".

=== Paid Bids ===
Paid bids are only offered to cheerleading teams for the Cheerleading Worlds portion of the event.

For cheerleading teams, a paid bid is designed to cover all competition expenses, including lodging, transportation and registration fees to compete, up to a maximum of $650 per athlete, and for up to two coaches. Paid bids for cheer teams are only awarded to the highest scoring teams at the largest and most prestigious competitions throughout the season leading up to the Cheerleading Worlds event.

=== Partial-Paid Bids ===
Partial-paid bids are also offered for cheerleading teams, awarding up to $325 per athlete and up to two coaches on a bid-winning team for a team's registration package, lodging, and/or transportation to Orlando to participate in the event.

Partial-paid bids are the only form of paid bid offered for dance teams for the Worlds event, also covering the cost of their registration packaging, accommodation and/or transportation to Orlando at a rate of $325 per athlete and up to two coaches, with a maximum of $5000 awarded per team.

=== At-Large Bids ===
At-large bids are the other type of bid available, working the same for both cheer and dance teams for these events. These bids are typically awarded to the teams who are eligible to compete at the Worlds events who are runners-up at bid-qualifying events, functioning as an invitation but requiring teams to pay for 100% of their own costs related to their participation at the event.

=== Bid-Qualifying Events ===
More than 120 USASF/IASF member event producers across the United States, as well as event producers within 32 international countries, have the right to host bid qualifying events for both cheer and dance teams.

For the 2023–2024 season, there are 35 bid-qualifying events within the United States at which a team can win a bid to the 2024 Dance Worlds.

=== Junior Team Bids (Dance) ===
In 2010, the Dance Worlds introduced a junior division, in which the bid process functioned differently. Junior teams did not win their bids at events, but rather via a review of video submissions. For US teams, any junior team was welcomed to submit a video to be reviewed, however only six teams were selected to receive at-large bids to compete in this division.

=== Bid Rules ===
A team awarded a bid must compete at the Worlds event in the same division and team-makeup in which they performed in at the qualifying event where their bid was awarded. The only exception to this is teams competing within the limited division, which is set aside for gyms that only field one Worlds-eligible team. The number of athletes that compete on any Worlds team is not allowed to exceed the number of athletes that took the floor with the team at their bid-qualifying event.

Cheer athletes within the same club are also limited to the number of teams in which they are eligible to compete and earn paid bids, with an athlete being bound to the second team they compete with that receives a paid bid. Teams are also limited in the number of athletes who previously earned paid bids who are allowed to compete for and be awarded paid bids on a second team.

Substitutes and wild-card alternates are also limited, with the number varying by division and global location.

Crossovers of athletes are not permitted between teams from the same club, between different clubs, or between cheer and dance teams from the same or different clubs. In other words, an athlete is only allowed to represent one team in either cheer or one club in dance when competing at Worlds. Also, there is a limit on the number of athletes per team that can compete at both the Summit (an end of year competition for levels 1-5) and The Cheerleading Worlds during the same competition season. This can be complicated for gyms as many level 6 worlds athletes also cross-compete with a level 4 or 5 Summit team at their gym.

== Cheer Levels and Divisions ==
The levels and divisions that are offered have changed significantly since the first event in 2004, with the event seeing a large growth and expansion over the years.

In 2025, the event will offer divisions in levels 5, 6 and 7 for international teams competing in IASF worlds divisions, while only offering level 6 divisions in USASF worlds divisions.

USASF Cheerleading Worlds Divisions 2025
Level	Divisions	Target Age	Birth Year	Females/Males	Number on Team
6	Limited Senior XSmall (LSXS)	14 - 19yo	1 June 2005-2011	No males	5 - 16 athletes
6	Senior XSmall (SXS)	14 - 19yo	1 June 2005-2011	No males	5 - 16 athletes
6	Limited Senior Small (LSS)	14 - 19yo	1 June 2005-2011	No males	17 - 22 athletes
6	Senior Small (SS)	14 - 19yo	1 June 2005-2011	No males	17 - 22 athletes
6	Senior Medium (SM)	14 - 19yo	1 June 2005-2011	No males	23 - 30 athletes
6	Senior Large (SL)	14 - 19yo	1 June 2005-2011	No males	31 - 38 athletes
6	Limited Senior XSmall Coed (LXSC)	14 - 19yo	1 June 2005-2011	1 - 2 males	5 - 16 athletes
6	Senior XSmall Coed (SXSC)	14 - 19yo	1 June 2005-2011	1 - 2 males	5 - 16 athletes
6	Limited Senior Small Coed (LSSC)	14 - 19yo	1 June 2005-2011	1 - 5 males	5 - 22 athletes
6	Senior Small Coed (SSC)	14 - 19yo	1 June 2005-2011	1 - 5 males	5 - 22 athletes
6	Senior Medium Coed (SMC)	14 - 19yo	1 June 2005-2011	1 - 8 males	5 - 30 athletes
6	Senior Large Coed (SLC)	14 - 19yo	1 June 2005-2011	1 - 19 males	5 - 38 athletes

IASF Cheerleading Worlds Divisions 2025
Level	Divisions	Target Age	Birth Year	Females/Males	Number on Team
5	IASF U18 Level 5 (U18-5)	14 - 18yrs	2006 - 2011	no males	16 - 24 athletes
5	IASF U18 Level 5 Coed Small Coed (U18SC-5)	14 - 18yrs	2006 - 2011	1 - 4 males	16 - 24 athletes
5	IASF Open 5 (IO-5)	16+ yrs	2009 or earlier	no males	16 - 24 athletes
5	IASF Open 5 Small Coed (IOSC-5)	16+ yrs	2009 or earlier	1 - 4 males	16 - 24 athletes
5	IASF Open 5 Large Coed (IOLC-5)	16+ yrs	2009 or earlier	5 - 16 males	16 - 24 athletes
6	IASF Open 6 (IO 6)	16+ yrs	2009 or earlier	no males	16 - 24 athletes
6	IASF Open 6 Small Coed (IOSC 6)	16+ yrs	2009 or earlier	1 - 4 males	16 - 24 athletes
6	IASF Open 6 Large Coed (IOLC 6)	16+ yrs	2009 or earlier	5 - 16 males	16 - 24 athletes
6	IASF U18 Level 6 Non Tumbling (U18NT-6)	14 - 18yrs	2006 - 2011	no males	16 - 30 athletes
6	IASF U18 Level 6 Non Tumbling Coed (U18NTC-6)	14 - 18yrs	2006 - 2011	1 - 20 males	16 - 30 athletes
6	IASF Open 6 Non Tumbling (IONT 6)	16+ yrs	2009 or earlier	no males	16 - 30 athletes
6	IASF Open 6 Non Tumbling Coed (IONTC 6)	16+ yrs	2009 or earlier	1 - 20 males	16 - 30 athletes
7	IASF Open 7 (IO 7)	17+ yrs	2008 or earlier	no males	16 - 24 athletes
7	IASF Open 7 Small Coed (IOSC 7)	17+ yrs	2008 or earlier	1 - 4 males	16 - 24 athletes
7	IASF Open 7 Large Coed (IOLC 7)	17+ yrs	2008 or earlier	5 - 16 males	16 - 24 athletes
7	IASF Open 7 Non Tumbling (IONT 7)	17+ yrs	2008 or earlier	no males	16 - 30 athletes
7	IASF Open 7 Non Tumbling Coed (IONTC 7)	17+ yrs	2008 or earlier	1 - 20 males	16 - 30 athletes

USASF teams will not be eligible to compete in any IASF level 5 division but will be allowed to enter in the IASF level 6 and 7 divisions.

It is known that for the 2024 event, the age grids will shift once again, with the minimum age for IASF open divisions levels 5 and 6 increasing to a minimum of 16 years old. Teams competing at the Cheerleading Worlds from the USA must follow the USASF age grid, eligibility, substitutions and alternate guidelines, which will have a known impact on the 2024 Cheerleading Worlds event as the minimum age for open teams saw a rise to a minimum of 18 years on the USASF age grid for the 2023–2024 season.

== Dance Styles and Divisions ==
The categories/styles that have been offered across the competition include hip hop, jazz, pom, contemporary/lyrical, kick, open and junior. USASF divisions offered the opportunity for teams with a target age of 13 to 19 years from within the United States to compete, with IASF divisions offering the opportunity for junior teams aged between 11 and 16 years old and open teams aged 15+ years old to compete.

USASF and IASF provide slightly differing descriptions of these styles, describing their expectations of routines entered within these categories:

Category	USASF Category Description 2023	IASF Category Description 2023
Hip Hop	"A Hip Hop routine can incorporate any street style movement that has evolved from the hip hop culture. Emphasis is placed on the execution of authentic style(s), originality, control, musicality, intricacy, uniformity and may incorporate purposeful elements and skills"	"A Hip Hop routine incorporates authentic street style-influenced movements with groove and style. An emphasis is placed on group execution, including synchronization, uniformity and spacing. The choreography of a dynamic and effective routine utilizes musicality, staging, complexity of movement and athleticism. Distinctive clothing and accessories reflecting the Hip Hop culture must be worn."
Jazz	"A Jazz routine can encompass any range of jazz movement including traditional jazz, commercial jazz, musical theater, jazz funk or stylized, hard-hitting jazz. Movement is crisp and/or aggressive in approach and can include moments of softness while complementing musicality. Emphasis is placed on style, body alignment, extension, control, uniformity, technical elements and communication."	"A Jazz routine incorporates traditional or stylized dynamic movements with strength, continuity, presence and proper technical execution. An emphasis is placed on group execution including synchronization, uniformity and spacing. The choreography of a dynamic and effective routine utilizes musicality, staging and complexity of movement and skills. The overall impression of the routine should be lively, energetic and motivating, with the understanding that the dynamics of movement may change to utilize musicality. Costuming should reflect the category style."
Pom	"A Pom routine contains important characteristics such as strong pom quality of movement (clean, precise, sharp motions), synchronization, visual effects and may incorporate purposeful pom elements (i.e. pom passes, jump sequences, leaps|turns, kick lines, etc). Poms should be used throughout the routine. Inadequate use of poms may also affect the panel judges’ overall impression and/ or score of the routine."	"A Pom routine incorporates the use of proper pom motion technique that is sharp, clean and precise while allowing for the use of concepts from jazz, hip hop and high kick. An emphasis is placed on group execution including synchronization, uniformity and spacing. The choreography of a dynamic and effective routine focuses on musicality and staging of visual effects through fluid and creative transitions, levels and groups, along with complexity of movement and skills. Poms are required to be used throughout the routine."
Contemporary/Lyrical	"A Contemporary or Lyrical routine uses organic, expressive, pedestrian and/or traditional modern and/ or ballet vocabulary as it complements the lyric, mood and/or rhythmic value of the music. Emphasis is placed on control, expressive movement, dynamics, alignment, use of breath, uniformity, communication and may incorporate purposeful elements and skills."	
Kick/High Kick	"A Kick routine emphasizes control, height uniformity, extension, toe points, timing and creativity of a variety of kick series and patterns. A kick is defined as one foot remaining on the floor while the other foot lifts with force. Kicks should be performed throughout the routine. Inadequate utilization of kicks may also affect the panel judges’ overall impression and/or score of the routine."	"A High Kick routine incorporates the use of proper high kick technique that includes flexibility, endurance, stamina, upper and lower body strength, placement and control, while allowing for the use of creative concepts such as staging and skills. High Kicks are required to be used throughout the majority of the routine in a purposeful manner and should be the emphasis of routine content. The choreography of a dynamic and effective high kick routine focuses on musicality, staging of visual effects through intervals in kick lines, fluid and creative transitions, levels and groups, along with complexity of movement and athleticism. An emphasis is placed on execution including synchronization, uniformity, and spacing. Costuming should reflect the category style."
Open		"Performances in Open Open incorporate organic, pedestrian and/or traditional modern or ballet vocabulary as it complements the lyrics and/or rhythmic value of the music. An emphasis is placed on group execution, including synchronization, uniformity and spacing. The choreography of a dynamic and effective routine utilizes musicality, staging and complexity of movement and skills. Costuming should reflect the category style."
Junior		"All performances in the Junior Division, regardless of style, will be judged against each other in the Junior Dance division. A routine in this division may incorporate any one style or combination of styles outlined in the IASF categories above."

== 2004 ==
The first USASF World Cheerleading Championship was held on April 24, 2004. This event was an invite-only competition, with only two divisions - Senior All Girl Level 5 and Senior Coed Level 5 - and only 14 teams competing. This first event was held at a backstage sound stage at Disney MGM Studios (now Disney Hollywood Studios) at Walt Disney World that held a maximum of 500 spectators. At this point in time, the winners of each category received jackets, similar to NCA and UCA, instead of the rings currently received.

=== Results ===
Division	Gold	Silver	Bronze
Senior All-Girl Level 5	Cheer Athletics	Maryland Twisters F5	American Cheer
Senior Coed Level 5	Miami Elite	Spirit of Texas	Memphis Elite

== 2005 ==
The second Cheerleading Worlds event happened April 23–25, 2005.

This year, the competition expanded to include both small and large divisions within the senior all-girl level 5 and senior coed level 5 categories, for a total of four divisions teams could be eligible within.

This year saw the first international teams competing at worlds with New Zealand All Stars, however, there was not yet a split of international divisions from regular divisions.

=== Results ===
Division	Gold	Silver	Bronze
Senior Small All-Girl Level 5	The Stingray All Stars	Georgia All Stars	Star Athletics
Senior Large All-Girl Level 5	Maryland Twisters - F5	Cheer Athletics	American Cheer
Senior Small Coed Level 5	Spirit of Texas	The Cheer Zone	Twist & Shout Academy
Senior Large Coed Level 5	Miami Elite	Cheer Athletics	Top Gun All Stars

== 2006 ==
The Cheerleading Worlds' third event occurred on April 21–24, 2006.

This year's event introduced the split of international divisions, offering international open all-girl level 5 and international open coed level 5 divisions, making a total of 6 divisions.

This also marked the first time that one gym program took home multiple titles within one year, with Cheer Athletics being the world champion across three divisions and GymTyme All Stars being the world champion across two divisions.

=== Results ===
Division	Gold	Silver	Bronze
Senior Small All-Girl Level 5	Cheer Athletics - Jags	The Stingray All Stars	Pro Spirit
Senior Large All-Girl Level 5	Cheer Athletics - Panthers	Charlotte Allstar Cheerleading	Maryland Twisters - F5
Senior Small Coed Level 5	GymTyme All Stars	Spirit of Texas	CheerForce - Simi Valley CheerForce Diamonds
Senior Large Coed Level 5	Cheer Athletics - Wildcats	Georgia All Stars	Texas Lone Star Cheer - Kentucky Elite
International Open All-Girl Level 5	Georgia All Stars	Middle School of GuanXi University (China)	Jaguars All Stars
International Open Coed Level 5	Gym Tyme All Stars	Star Athletics	Extreme Cheer and Dance

== 2007 ==
The Cheerleading Worlds 2007 was held on April 20 to 23, 2007 at Walt Disney World, Florida.

This year's event introduced junior divisions in cheerleading, as well as introducing the sub-event to run concurrently, the Dance Worlds.

The first Dance Worlds was held on April 21–22, 2007 at Disney's MGM Studios, Walt Disney World, Orlando, Florida. At this event, limited categories were offered, with senior dance offered in jazz, pom and hiphop for athletes 18 years and younger, and international open dance offered for dancers 14 years and older.

Partial paid bids were offered to this event, awarded to the best teams in one or more of the worlds divisions at a worlds qualifying event. Companies offering partial paid bids offered a specific dollar amount towards a team's travel package, however USASF/IASF did not yet specify the amount of a partial paid bid.

Athletes were not allowed to cross over between cheer and dance teams from the same or other gyms, compete in more than one team, or perform in more than two categories with their team. If a team is found to have a crossover, the team was disqualified, responsible for repaying the total cost of any funds received through a paid or partial paid bid, and was ineligible for any type of bid for The Cheerleading or Dance Worlds for the following years.

This year was also marked the first year that championship rings were introduced for each athlete who was a member of a world championship-winning team.

=== Results ===
Cheerleading Results
Division	Gold	Silver	Bronze
Senior Small All-Girl Level 5	The Stingray All Stars - Orange	Spirit of Texas	Basics Super Stars
Senior Large All-Girl Level 5	World Cup Allstars - Shooting Stars	Cheer Athletics	Cheer Extreme
Senior Small Coed Level 5	Gym Tyme All Stars	The Stingray All Stars	CheerForce Diamonds
Senior Large Coed Level 5	Top Gun All Stars (Miami)	Cheer Athletics - Wildcats	Georgia All Stars
International Junior All-Girl Level 5	World Cup Allstars - Starlites	Celebrity Cheer	Desert Storm Elite
International Junior Coed Level 5	Flip Factory	Infinity All Stars - Titans	Texas Lone Star Cheer - Kentucky Elite
International Open All-Girl Level 5	Encore Cheer Company	Cambridge Sharks	Oklahoma Twisters
International Open Coed Level 5	Gym Tyme All Stars	Texas Lone Stars Cheer Company	Cheer Extreme Raleigh

Dance Results
Division	Gold	Silver	Bronze
Senior Hip Hop	Showtime Studio - Showtime Storm	Celebrity Cheer - Celebrity Dance	California Cheer Gym
Senior Jazz	PACE Elite - Pace Dance	360 Dance - 360 Dance Force	South Coast Freestyle
Senior Pom	Tie Desoto Dreamz Elite - Desoto Dance All Stars & Planet Dance - Planet Dance All Stars		Memphis Elite
International Open Dance	PACE Elite - Pace Dance	Silver Wings	Alpha Cheer & Dance Company

== 2008 ==
The 2008 Worlds event was on April 26–28, 2008.

This year marked the introduction of level 6 into the cheerleading divisions, being introduced in the international open category. This year also marked the beginning of limited/unlimited splits in divisions.

The Dance Worlds divisions returned for a second year, being held at Disney's EPCOT in the World Showcase Pavilion.

=== Results ===
Cheer Results
Division	Gold	Silver	Bronze
Senior Small All-Girl Level 5	The Stingray All Stars	TIE California All Stars & Pro Spirit	n/a due to silver tie
Senior Large All-Girl Level 5	World Cup All Stars - Shooting Stars	Cheer Extreme	Maryland Twisters - F5
Senior Limited Coed Large Level 5	Spirit of Texas	Twist & Shout Academy	World Cup All Stars - Odyssey
Senior Unlimited Coed Level 5	Top Gun Miami	California All Stars	The Stingray All Stars
International Junior All-Girl Level 5	World Cup All Stars - Starlites	Austin Cheer Factory	Maryland Twisters - Supercells
International Junior Coed Level 5	University Cheer Junior Air Force	Platinum Elite All Stars	Infinity Titans - Greek Gods
International Open All-Girl Small Level 5	Cheer Athletics - Fierce Katz	No. 25 Middle School of Nanning (China)	Gold Star All Stars - Galaxy
International Open All-Girl Large Level 5	South Elite All Stars	Cheer Extreme	West Valley Thunder
International Open Coed Small Level 5	Cheer Athletics - Pumas	California All Stars	Top Gun (Miami)
International Open Coed Large Level 5	Gym Tyme All Stars	Storm Cheer Academy - Storm Cheer Wrath	Cheer Athletics - Junglecats
International Open All-Girl Level 6	Payson All Star Cheer - PACE Phoenix All Stars		
International Open Coed Level 6	The Stingray All Stars	Payson All Star Cheer - PACE Empire	Guangzhou Sports University (China)

Dance Results
Division	Gold	Silver	Bronze
Senior Hip Hop	Ultimate Cheer and Dance West Palm - Eastern Washington Elite	Lake Mary AS	Rebels All Stars
Senior Jazz	PACE Elite - Pace Dance	Dancer's Edge Studio	Apex All Stars
Senior Pom	Dancer's Edge Studio	PACE Elite - Pace Dance	Planet Dance
International Open Hip Hop	ADA Dark Angels	PACE Elite - Pace	Pittsburgh Poison - Spiders
International Open Jazz	PACE Elite - Pace Dance	JF Oberlin University	Silver Wings Japan
International Open Pom	Golden Hawks	Dance Club NOA Spalantine	Tecnologico de Monterrey Campus Cuernavaca

== 2009 ==
The 2009 Cheerleading and Dance Worlds were held on April 25 to 26, 2009. The Cheerleading Worlds divisions were held across the Disney Wild World of Sport's Milkhouse arena and Disney's Hollywood Studios' Indiana Jones Theatre, while the Dance Worlds divisions were held at the World Showplace Pavilion inside Disney's EPCOT, both at Walt Disney World.

Preliminaries were held for all senior level 5 cheerleading divisions as well as all senior dance teams, with only 50% of teams progressing to the finals to compete for the championship.

Preliminaries were also held for international division cheerleading and dance teams, with a maximum of three of the highest scoring teams per country advancing to finals. International division cheerleading score sheets were adjusted to reflect the predominant international skill capabilities at the time.

IASF's Nation Cup was awarded at this event to the highest-scoring team from each country within the top 10 in international divisions, ranked by the average of all scores from all teams per country within a division.

The Dance Worlds introduced a specific amount for their partially paid bids, with bids partially paying $3500 per team for their accommodation packages at Disney's All Star Sports Resort.

Dance athletes were now limited to performing in two categories, representing the same gym/studio. Crossovers between gym/studios were not allowed, and crossovers between cheer and dance teams from the same or other gyms/studios were also not permitted. If a team was found to breach these crossover rules, they were disqualified, responsible for repayment of funds received through any paid bid, and not eligible for any type of bid to either Cheerleading or Dance Worlds the following year.

=== Results ===
Cheer Results
Division	Gold	Silver	Bronze
Senior Small All-Girl Level 5	The Stingray All Stars	Cheer Extreme Raleigh	Woodlands Elite - Generals
Senior Large All-Girl Level 5	World Cup All Stars - Shooting Stars	Cheer Athletics - Panthers	Cheer Extreme Allstars
Senior Limited Coed Small Level 5	Brandon All Stars - Black	Tribe Chiefs	ICE All Stars
Senior Limited Coed Large Level 5	Spirit of Texas	Twist & Shout Allstars	Ace of Alabama - Warriors
Senior Unlimited Coed Level 5	Top Gun Miami	Cheer Extreme Allstars	Georgia All Stars
International Junior All-Girl Level 5	Maryland Twisters - Supercells	Celebrity Cheer	World Cup All Stars - Starlites
International Junior Coed Level 5	Cheer Athletics - Jags	South Jersey Storm	University Cheer Junior Air Force One
International Open All-Girl Level 5	Cheer Athletics - Fiercekatz	Cheer Extreme	Cheer Sport Sharks
International Open Coed Small Level 5	Cheer Athletics - Wildcats	Spirit of Texas	Top Gun Miami
International Open All-Girl Level 6	UPAC - Miss Panther	Cyclones (Japan)	Team UK
International Open Coed Level 6	Gym Time All Stars	The Stingray Allstars	South Jersey Storm

Dance Results
Division	Gold	Silver	Bronze
Senior Hip Hop	ECB - ECB Street Elite	Adrenaline Cheer N Dance Club - Eastern Washington Elite	Extreme All Stars Florida - Extreme Allstars Cheer & Dance
Senior Jazz	PACE Elite - PACE All Stars	Easter Washington Elite House of 509 - Easter Washington Elite	Dancer's Edge Studio
Senior Pom	Energizers Dance Team	Dance Unlimited	Star Performance Center
International Open Hip Hop	Alpha Cheer & Dance Co	ADA Dark Angels	ECB - ECB Street Elite
International Open Jazz	PACE Elite - PACE All Stars	JF Oberlin University	Silver Wings Jr
International Open Pom	PACE Elite - PACE All Stars	Leopards	Wen-Hua Senior High School

== 2010 ==
The 2010 Cheerleading and Dance Worlds were held between April 22 and 26, 2010 at Walt Disney World, Orlando, Florida.

Cheerleading divisions were held on April 24 and 25, 2010 at the ESPN Wide World of Sports complex, with preliminary rounds being held within the Disney Hollywood Studios theme park for the international divisions. Dance divisions were held at EPCOT's World Showcase Pavilion from April 22 to 26, 2010. This year saw the introduction of an international junior dance division for athletes 14 years and younger, competing in the open category where they may incorporate any one style or combination of styles. All styles within the category were judges against each other, with the emphasis placed on choreography, proper technical execution, visual effect, creativity, staging and team uniformity. Semi-finals were also held for this category, with three of the highest scoring teams from each country progressing to finals. Teams within this category did not win their bids at events, rather having the opportunity to submit a video where the top 3 teams were picked to represent their country at the 2010 Dance Worlds. The 2010 Dance Worlds event also saw a split within the Senior Hip Hop division, with a co-ed division being created for teams that contained 2 or more males.

The 2010 event rules limited an athlete to performing a maximum of three times, representing the same studio/program/gym. Crossovers of participants from other studios/programs/gyms were not allowed, with crossovers between cheer and dance teams, regardless of whether it was the same or another studio, also not permitted. If a team was found to breach this rule, the team was disqualified, responsible for repaying the total cost of any funds received through a partial paid bid, and were not eligible for any type of bid for the Cheerleading or Dance Worlds the following year.

=== Results ===
Cheer Results
Division	Gold	Silver	Bronze
Senior Small All-Girl Level 5	The Stingray All Stars	Cheer Extreme - SSX	California All Stars
Senior Large All-Girl Level 5	Cheer Extreme - Senior Elite	World Cup - Shooting Stars	Cheer Athletics - Panthers
Senior Limited Coed Small Level 5	Premier Athletics - Kentucky Elite Cats	Brandon All Stars	Rockstar Cheer - The Rolling Stones
Senior Limited Coed Large Level 5	Woodland Elite Generals	Spirit of Texas	The Stingray All Stars
Senior SemiLimited Coed Level 5	Georgia Allstars	ACE Warriors	South Jersey Storm
Senior Unlimited Coed Level 5	Top Gun Allstars (Miami)	California All Stars	Cheer Extreme - Coed Elite
International Junior All-Girl Level 5	Maryland Twisters - Supercells	World Cup Allstars - Starlites	Green Bay Elite
International Junior Coed Level 5	California All Stars	Cheer Athletics - Jags	Ultimate Athletics - Dynasty
International Open All-Girl Level 5	GymTyme - Pink	Rockstar Cheer - The Killers	Cheer Athletics - Fiercekatz
International Open Coed Level 5	Top Gun All Stars (Miami)	Cheer Athletics - Wildcats	Spirit of Texas
International Open All-Girl Level 6	Gym Tyme Orange	Tigres UANL	East Celebrity Elite
International Open Coed Level 6	Gym Tyme Infinity	Twist & Shout Open Coed	The Stingray All Stars

Dance Results
Division	Gold	Silver	Bronze
International Junior Dance	DSF All Star - DSF Brilliants Junior	Golden Hawks - Golden Hawks Junior	Arizona Angels Dance Studio - Arizona Angels Junior Pom
Senior Hip Hop	East Celebrity Elite - Envy	ECB - ECB's Street Elite	Emerald City Jewels All-Star Cheer - Eastern Washington Elite
Senior Coed Hip Hop	Extreme All Stars PA - Extreme Senior Hip Hop	ECB - ECB's Street Elite	Star Performance Centre
Senior Jazz	PACE Elite - Pace Elite Dance	Power House Tumblers - Eastern Washington Elite	Dancer's Edge Studio
Senior Pom	Dance Mania - Dance Mania All Stars	PACE Elite - Pace Elite Dance	Energizers Dance Team
International Open Hip Hop	DSF All Star - DSF Brilliants Impression	ECB - ECB's Street Elite	Champion Legacy
International Open Jazz	PACE Elite - Pace Elite Dance	JF Oberline University - JF Oberlin University Dance	Japan Women's College of PE - Grins
International Open Pom	PACE Elite - Pace Elite Dance	Golden Hawks	Ladies Hurricanes - Dance for the Planet

== 2011 ==
The 2011 Cheerleading and Dance Worlds were held between April 28 and May 2, 2011, at Walt Disney World, Orlando, Florida. The cheerleading divisions were held on April 30 and May 1, 2011, at the ESPN Wide World of Sports complex, while the dance divisions were held between April 28 and May 2 at EPCOT's World Showplace Pavilion.

2011 marked the removal of the junior international cheerleading divisions from eligible worlds divisions. However, the dance divisions expanded with the open hip hop category now splitting into all-girl and coed for teams containing 2 or more males.

Cheerleading preliminary rounds were held for at large bid winners in all divisions with 40 or more registered teams, with the top 50% of at large bid winners moving onto semi-finals with the partial bid and paid bid winners. In all international divisions where 11 or more US teams were entered, Worlds Trial preliminaries were held to advance only the top 10 to semi-finals.

Dance semi-finals were held for all senior divisions, international divisions and junior dance divisions on Saturday 30 April 2011. Within the senior divisions, 50% of the teams progressed from the semi-finals to the finals. For the international and junior dance divisions, a maximum of 3 of the highest-scoring teams from each country progressed from the semi-finals to the finals.

IASF awarded the Nations Cup within international divisions to the highest scoring teams from each country from the top 5 countries, with the top 5 countries determined by the average score of all teams from each country.

=== Results ===
Cheer Results
Division	Gold	Silver	Bronze
Senior Small All-Girl Level 5	Cheer Athletics - Panthers	The California All Stars - Elite	The Stingray All Stars
Senior Large All-Girl Level 5	Maryland Twisters - F5	World Cup - Shooting Stars	Cheer Extreme Allstars - Senior Elite
Senior Limited Coed Small Level 5	Brandon All Stars - Senior Black	The California All Stars	Rockstar Cheer - The Beatles
Senior Limited Coed Large Level 5	Twist & Shout - Senior Obsession	Spirit of Texas	Charlotte All Stars - Teal
Senior SemiLimited Coed Large Level 5	ACE Warriors	Top Gun All Stars Miami	Cheer Athletics - Cheetahs
Senior Unlimited Coed Level 5	The California All Stars - Coed	Cheer Extreme Allstars - Coed Elite	Pro Cheer All Stars
International Open All-Girl Level 5	Gym Tyme - Pink	Rockstar Cheer - The Killers	Cheer Athletics - FierceKatz
International Open Coed Level 5	Top Gun All Stars (Miami) - I5	Cheer Athletics - Wildcats	Spirit of Texas
International Open All-Girl Level 6	Flyers All-Starz Montreal	Viqueens Cheerleaders Spirit	Cyclones (Japan)
International Open Coed Level 6	TIE Bangkok University & GymTyme Nfinity	Top Gun Allstars (Miami) - I6	Lonestar Allstarz - Lonestar Cheer Company Open 6

Dance Results
Division	Gold	Silver	Bronze
International Junior Dance	Golden Hawks - Golden Hawks Junior	PACE Elite - Pace Elite Dance	Cheers Factory Esperanza
Senior Hip Hop	East Celebrity Elite - Envy	Pittsburgh Poison - Black Widows	Footnotes Fusion
Senior Coed Hip Hop	Star Performance Centre	ECB - ECB Street Elite	Stallion All Stars
Senior Jazz	PACE Elite	Dancer's Edge Studio	Dance Mania
Senior Pom	Dancer's Edge Studio	South Coast Freestyle	PACE Elite
International Open Hip Hop	Exisdanz	ADA Dark Angels	Planets Dance Company - Planets
International Open Coed Hip Hop	ECB - ECB Street Elite	Extreme All Stars Florida	Top Gun All Stars Miami
International Open Jazz	PACE Elite	Dancer's Edge Studio	Wing Dance Promotion - Silver Wings
International Open Pom	PACE Elite	All Star MexiCOP	Golden Hawks

== 2012 ==
The 2012 Cheerleading and Dance Worlds event was held April 27 to April 29, 2012, at the Walt Disney World Resort, Orlando Florida. Cheerleading divisions were held at the ESPN Wide World of Sports Complex, while dance divisions were once again held at EPCOT's World Showcase Pavilion.

This year's event included preliminary divisions for all cheerleading teams in the senior coed divisions, and teams with at large bids in the senior all-girl cheerleading divisions as well as US worlds trials for all US teams entered in international cheerleading divisions.

A preliminary round was held for U.S. based dance teams entered in the International Open Coed Hip Hop division, titled U.S. Worlds Trials. The top 10 U.S. teams in the U.S. Worlds Trials progressed to the Worlds International Open Coed Hip Hop division's semi-final round, with all teams from non U.S. countries. All dance teams in the international categories then competed in semi finals, with the three highest scoring teams from each country progressing to compete in the finals. All dance teams accepted into the junior dance category competed in a semi-finals round, with the three highest scoring teams from each country progressing to finals. All senior dance categories also had semi-finals, with a minimum of 50% of the teams from each of the senior dance divisions progressing to finals.

IASF's Nations Cup was once again awarded, however this year saw the placements based on each country's highest team in the division instead of being based on an average score of all teams for each country within the division.

This event marked a change in the way age was determined for international categories governed by the IASF, switching to the ICU "year of the competition" model in which the age of the athlete was determined based on their date of birth falling during the year of the competition. This meant that an athlete who was 13, but turned 14 before December 31, 2012, was eligible to compete at the 2012 Cheerleading and Dance Worlds in the international open categories that had a minimum age of 14.

=== Results ===
Cheer Results
Division	Gold	Silver	Bronze
Senior Small All-Girl Level 5	The Stingray Allstars	The California All Stars - Elite	Cheer Extreme
Senior Medium All-Girl Level 5	Cheer Athletics - Panthers	The California All-Stars - ACES	Woodlands Elite - Generals
Senior Large All-Girl Level 5	Cheer Extreme - Senior Elite	Maryland Twisters - F5	World Cup - Shooting Stars
Senior Small Coed Level 5	California All Stars - Smoed	Brandon All Stars - Senior Black	ICE - Lightning
Senior Medium Coed Level 5	Spirit of Texas	South Elite Allstars - Diamonds	Twist & Shout - Obsession
Senior Large Coed Level 5	Cheer Athletics - Cheetahs	The California All Stars - Coed	Top Gun All Stars Miami
International Open All-Girl Level 5	Gym Tyme All Stars - Pink	Cheer Sport Great White Sharks	Cheer Athletics - Fiercekatz
International Open Coed Level 5	Gym Tyme All Stars - Black	Spirit of Texas	Cheer Athletics - Wildcats
International Open All-Girl Level 6	Cheer Athletics - LadyKatz	Viqueens - Spirit	Twist & Shout - Passion
International Open Coed Level 6	Twist & Shout - Generals	Gym Tyme All Stars - Nfinity	Stealth All Stars - Phoenix

Dance Results
Division	Gold	Silver	Bronze
International Junior Dance	Cheers Factory - Desire	South Coast Freestyle	Wing Flap
Senior Hip Hop	Extreme All Stars Florida	Star Performance Centre	East Celebrity Elite - Envy
Senior Coed Hip Hop	Dance Athletics - Crewkatz	Stallion Allstars - Empire	Showtime Storm
Senior Jazz	PACE Elite	Dancer's Edge Studio	The Vision Dance Center
Senior Pom	Golden Hawks - Golden Hawks Senior (Japan)	PACE Elite	OC All Stars - Platinum
International Open Hip Hop	Golden Hawks	Exisdanz	ADA Dark Angels
International Open Coed Hip Hop	DSF All Star	Extreme All Stars Florida	Top Gun All Stars Miami
International Open Jazz	JF Oberlin University - Cream	PACE Elite	Dancer's Edge Studio
International Open Pom	PACE Elite	Planets Dance Company - Planets	All Star MexiCOP

== 2013 ==
The 2013 Cheerleading and Dance Worlds were held April 27 to 29, 2013 at Walt Disney World Resort, Orlando, Florida. Cheerleading teams competed at the ESPN Wide World of Sports Complex, while dance teams competed at EPCOT's World Showcase Pavilion.

Cheerleading preliminaries were held for at large bid winners within the senior all-girl divisions, all teams within the senior coed divisions and all US teams within the international divisions.

Dance semi-finals were held for the senior divisions on the Saturday and Sunday, with a minimum of 50% of the teams from each division progressing to their division final, held over the Sunday and Monday of competition. Junior teams also had a semi-final, with a maximum of 3 of the highest scoring teams from each country progressing from semi-finals to finals.

The U.S. teams entering the International Open Coed Hip Hop were required to participate in preliminary U.S. Worlds Trials, in which the top 10 teams would progress to the Worlds International Open Coed Hip Hop division semi-finals round with all teams from non-U.S. countries. Within the international divisions, a maximum of 3 of the highest scoring teams from each country progressed from semi-finals to finals in the international divisions.

Dance athletes were allowed to perform up to three times representing the same program, however was not allowed to represent other programs or cross over to a cheer team competing at the Cheerleading Worlds.

This year's event introduced new dance divisions, offering a coed split in the international open jazz and pom categories, as well as a male only division in the international open hip hop division.

=== Results ===
Cheer Results
Division	Gold	Silver	Bronze
Senior Small All-Girl Level 5	The California All Stars - Lady Bullets	Cheer Extreme - SSX	ICE - Lady Lightning
Senior Medium All-Girl Level 5	The Stingray Allstars	The California All Stars - Aces	FAME All Stars - Super Seniors
Senior Large All-Girl Level 5	Cheer Extreme - Senior Elite	Cheer Athletics - Panthers	World Cup - Shooting Stars
Senior Small Coed Level 5	The California All Stars - Smoed	Rockstar Cheer - The Beatles	Mac's All Star Cheer - Senior Starz
Senior Medium Coed Level 5	The California All Stars - Black Ops	Spirit of Texas	Twist & Shout - Obsession
Senior Large Coed Level 5	Top Gun All Stars Miami	Cheer Athletics - Cheetahs	Cheer Extreme - Large Coed
International Open All-Girl Level 5	The California All Stars - Sparkle	Vancouver All Stars - Ice Queens	Cheer Sport Sharks - Great White
International Open Coed Level 5	Cheer Athletics - Wildcats	Gym Tyme All Stars - Black Smack	Pacific Coast Magic
International Open All-Girl Level 6	Flyers All Starz - Open Pink Legends	Twist & Shout - Passion	Viqueens - Spirit
International Open Coed Level 6	Stealth All Star - Phoenix	BCA-Club Deportivo Elite All Stars	Team Puerto Rico

Dance Results
Divisions	Gold	Silver	Bronze
International Junior Dance	Cheers Factory	Pittsburgh Poison	C*Star
Senior Hip Hop	Extreme All Stars	Champion Legacy	Golden Hawks - Golden Hawks Senior (Japan)
Senior Coed Hip Hop	Lawrence G-Force Athletics - Eastern Washington Elite	Showtime Studio - Storm	Dance Athletics - CrewKatz
Senior Jazz	Dancer's Edge Studio	PACE Elite	South Coast Freestyle Dance
Senior Pom	Energizers Dance Team	PACE Elite	Dancer's Edge Studio
International Open Hip Hop	Exisdanz	Intros Crew Crew - Intros All Stars	Heart of Ohio All Stars
International Open Coed Hip Hop	DSF All Star	Extreme All Stars Florida	Pittsburgh Poison
International Open Male Hip Hop	GuangXi Normal University	Showtime Studio - Shocka Lockers	Team Chinese Taipei
International Open Jazz	Japan Women's College of Physical Education - Grins	Dancer's Edge Studio	The Vision Dance All Stars
International Open Coed Jazz	All Star MexiCOP	PACE Elite	Bradshaw Elite
International Open Pom	PACE Elite	Energizers Dance Team	JF Oberlin University - Cream
International Open Coed Pom	All Star MexiCOP	Lions All Star - Pride	Bradshaw Elite

== 2014 ==
The 2014 Cheerleading and Dance Worlds were held April 26–28, 2014 at Walt Disney World, Orlando, Florida. The Cheerleading Worlds divisions were held at the ESPN Wide World of Sports complex, while the Dance Worlds divisions were held at EPCOT's World Showplace Pavilion.

Cheerleading division preliminaries were held for winners of at-large bids within the senior divisions, with senior coed divisions split into groups A and B and the top 10 from each preliminary round progressing to semi-finals. Preliminaries were also held for all US cheerleading teams within the international open divisions, with the top 10 advancing to compete in international open semi-finals. Preliminaries for the US international open teams, known as world trials, had their preliminaries held at Epcot's World Showcase pavilion.

Dance semi-finals were held for the senior divisions, with a minimum of 50% of the teams from each division progressing to their division final. Junior teams also had a semi-final, with a maximum of 3 of the highest scoring teams from each country progressing from semi-finals to finals. The U.S. dance teams entering the International Open Coed Hip Hop were required to participate in preliminary U.S. Worlds Trials, in which the top 10 teams would progress to the Worlds International Open Coed Hip Hop division semi-finals round with all teams from non-U.S. countries. Within all international dance divisions, a maximum of 3 of the highest scoring teams from each country progressed from semi-finals to finals in the international divisions.

At this event, an athlete was allowed to perform up to three times representing the same dance program, however was not allowed to represent other dance programs or cross over to a cheer team competing at the Cheerleading Worlds.

=== Results ===
Cheer Results
Division	Gold	Silver	Bronze
Senior Small All-Girl Level 5	ICE - Lady Lightning	The California All Stars - Lady Bullets	Cheer Extreme - SSX
Senior Medium All-Girl Level 5	Top Gun All Stars (Miami) - Lady Jags	Spirit of Texas - A Team	Maryland Twisters - F5
Senior Large All-Girl Level 5	The Stingray All Stars - Orange	World Cup All Stars - Shooting Stars	Cheer Athletics - Panthers
Senior Small Coed Level 5	The California All Stars - Smoed	Brandon All-Stars - Senior Black	Louisiana Cheer Force - Gold
Senior Medium Coed Level 5	Twist & Shout - Obsession	Spirit of Texas - Purple Royalty	Maryland Twisters - Reign
Senior Large Coed Level 5	Top Gun All Stars Miami - Large Coed	The California All Stars - Cali Coed	Cheer Extreme - Coed Elite
International Open All-Girl Level 5	Cheer Sport Sharks - Great Whites (Canada)	Flyers All Starz - Intensity (Canada)	GymTyme AllStars - Pink Ladies (USA)
International Open Coed Level 5	Cheer Athletics - Wildcats (USA)	Spirit of Texas - Purple Reign (USA)	CheerForce - Nfinity (USA)
International Open All-Girl Level 6	Cheer Athletics - LadyKatz (USA)	CheerForce - Lady Aztecs (USA)	Flyers All Starz - Pink Fearless (Canada)
International Open Coed Level 6	Bangkok University Cheerleading Team (Thailand)	Champion Cheer - Phoenix (USA)	Pacific Coast Magic (USA)

Results:
Division	Gold	Silver	Bronze
International Junior Dance	Dancers Edge Studio	South Coast Freestyle	Wing Flap
Senior Hip Hop	Extreme All Stars Florida	Champion Legacy	Pittsburgh Poison - Black Widows
Senior Coed Hip Hop	Extreme All Stars Florida	Illustr8tive Studios - Street	Dance Force Studios - Vitality
Senior Jazz	Dancers Edge Studio - Senior All Stars	PACE Elite	The Vision Dance Center
Senior Pom	Dancers Edge Studio - Senior All Stars	Energizers Dance Team	South Coast Freestyle
International Open Hip Hop	Star Performance Center	Norwegian All Stars	Champion Legacy
International Open Coed Hip Hop	DSF All Stars	Extreme All Stars Florida	Footnotes Fusion
International Open Male Hip Hop	Champion Legacy - Evolution	Premier Athletics Clayton - Galactic Gentlemen	Valley Cheer Elite - Hot Mess
International Open Jazz	Japan Women's College of Physical Education - Grins	The Vision Dance Center	Dancer's Edge Studio
International Open Coed Jazz	PACE Elite	Team Puerto Rico	Rocheer Studio
International Open Pom	PACE Elite	The Vision Dance Center	Golden Hawks
International Open Coed Pom	PACE Elite	Rocheer Studio - Rocheer Pom	Dance Mania

== 2015 ==
The 2015 Cheerleading and Dance Worlds were held April 25–27, 2015 at Walt Disney World Resort, Orlando, Florida. The cheerleading divisions were once again held at the ESPN Wide World of Sports complex while the dance divisions continued to be held at EPCOT's World Showplace Pavilion.

Cheerleading preliminaries were held for at-large bid winners in the senior small and senior medium divisions for both all-girl and coed teams. The senior small cheerleading divisions had preliminary group splits, with 10 teams advancing from each group to the semi-finals. International open preliminary world trials were held for both US and Canadian cheerleading teams this year due to the number of teams being entered into international open all-girl level 5 and international open coed level 5 from Canada the previous year. No US worlds trials were held for the international open all-girl 6 cheerleading division due to there being less than 11 US teams that had entered the division in 2014, automatically advancing all US teams to semi-finals.

Dance semi-finals were held for all senior dance divisions, with a minimum of 50% of the teams from each division progressing to their division final. Junior dance teams also had a semi-final, with a maximum of 3 of the highest scoring teams from each country progressing from semi-finals to finals. The U.S. teams entering the International Open Coed Hip Hop were required to participate in preliminary U.S. Worlds Trials, in which the top 10 teams would progress to the Worlds International Open Coed Hip Hop division semi-finals round with all teams from non-U.S. countries. Within all international divisions, a maximum of 3 of the highest scoring teams from each country progressed from semi-finals to finals in the international divisions.

New divisions were introduced in dance year, as the senior hip hop and senior coed hip hop divisions were split by team size into small and large divisions. Small teams were limited to having 4 - 14 dancers, with large teams being limited to having 15 or more dancers.

=== Results ===
Cheer Results
Division	Gold	Silver	Bronze
Senior Small All-Girl Level 5	Woodlands Elite Cheer Company - Generals	California All Stars (San Marcos) - Lady Bullets	Top Gun All Stars (Orlando) - Angels
Senior Medium All-Girl Level 5	Stingray Cheer Company Inc - Peach	Spirit of Texas - A Team	Top Gun All Stars Miami - Lady Jags
Senior Large All-Girl Level 5	World Cup - Shooting Stars	Cheer Extreme - Senior Elite	Cheer Athletics - Panthers
Senior Small Coed Level 5	California All Stars-Smoed	Vizion All Stars Cheerleading and Gymnastics- 20/20	Brandon All Stars - Senior Black
Senior Medium Coed Level 5	East Celebrity Elite (Tewksbury) - C5	Spirit of Texas - Royalty	The California All Stars - Livermore
Senior Large Coed Level 5	Cheer Extreme - Coed Elite	Top Gun All Stars Miami	The California All Stars
International Open All-Girl Level 5	Cheer Sport Sharks - Great White Sharks (Canada)	Cheer Athletics - Fiercekatz (USA)	Cheer Extreme - Cougars (USA)
International Open Coed Level 5	CheerForce Inc San Diego - Nfinity (USA)	Cheer Athletics - Wildcats (USA)	GymTyme All Stars - Blink (USA)
International Open All-Girl Level 6	GymTyme All Stars - Golden Girls (USA)	Flyers All Starz - Karma (USA)	California All Stars - Ventura Sexy 6 (USA)
International Open Coed Level 6	GymTyme All Stars - Chrome (USA)	Cheer Athletics - Claw6 (USA)	Pacific Coast Magic - Irvine Resurrection (USA)

Dance Results:
Division	Gold	Silver	Bronze
International Junior Dance	Dancer's Edge Studio	C*Star Artis (Japan)	Dancin’ Bluebonnets - Open Jazz
Senior Small Hip Hop	Prismatic (Japan)	Premier Athletics - Clayton Shockers - Senior Big Diprz	(Dup)Valley Cheer and Dance - Eastern Washington Elite
Senior Large Hip Hop	Champion Legacy	South Jersey Storm - Whirlwind	Extreme All Stars Florida
Senior Small Coed Hip Hop	Pittsburgh Poison - Dart Frogs	Midwest Cheer Elite - Tribe	Goddesses Dance Team
Senior Large Coed Hip Hop	Pittsburgh Poison - Cyanide	Star Performance Centre	Extreme All Stars
Senior Jazz	Dancer's Edge Studio - Senior Silver Jazz	Dancin Bluebonnets	PACE Elite
Senior Pom	Energizers Dance Team	Cheers Factory (Japan)	Dancer's Edge Studio
International Open Hip Hop	Team Philipinas - Sayawatha	Planets Dance Company - OHH	Power House of Dance - Fly Kids
International Open Coed Hip Hop	Premier Athletics Clayton Shockers - SupaNovaz	Extreme All Stars Florida	Pittsburgh Poison
International Open Male Hip Hop	Extreme All Stars Florida	Power House of Dance - Crew	Premier Athletics Clayton - Galactic Gentlemen
International Open Jazz	The Vision Dance Center	PACE Elite	Mt. Eden Ballet Company
International Open Coed Jazz	PACE Elite	Dance Dynamics	Xihua University (China)
International Open Pom	PACE Elite	Planets (Japan)	South Coast Freestyle
International Open Coed Pom	PACE Elite	Energizers Dance Team	Star Performance Centre

== 2016 ==
The 2016 Cheerleading and Dance Worlds were held April 23–25, 2016 at Walt Disney World, Orlando, Florida.

Cheerleading divisions were held at the ESPN Wide World of Sports complex. while dance divisions were held at Disney's Coronado Springs Resort and Convention Center.

Preliminaries were held for at-large bid winners in the senior small and senior medium divisions for both all-girl and coed cheerleading teams. The senior small and senior small coed cheerleading preliminaries saw a group A and group B split due to high numbers, with 10 teams from each group advancing to semi-finals.

US world trials cheerleading preliminaries were held for all US teams entered in international open all-girl 5 and international coed level 5 divisions this year, with all US teams in other International divisions automatically advancing to semi-finals.

Canadian world trials cheerleading preliminaries were held for all Canadian teams competing in international open coed 5, with all Canadian teams from other international divisions automatically advancing to semi-finals.

Dance preliminary rounds were held for the small senior hip hop division, with all senior divisions having semi-finals and finals. Between each round, 50% of teams were cut.

Dance preliminaries were also held for all U.S. teams entering in the international open coed hip hop division, known as the U.S. World Trials. The top 10 teams from this round progressed to the semi-finals to compete against all other teams within the division. All international open divisions as well as the international junior dance division held semi-finals, in which only the top 3 scoring teams from each country progressed to the finals.

This year saw an alteration in the crossover rules, with an athlete now allowed to perform up to four times in dance divisions representing the same program. However, the rules not allowing crossovers between programs or between cheer and dance teams remained in place, with a breach of these rules leading to the consequence of disqualification, repayment of any paid bid funds and ineligibility to receive bids for the following year's event.

=== Results ===
Cheer Results
Division	Gold	Silver	Bronze
Senior Small All-Girl Level 5	Cheer Extreme - SSX	Woodlands Elite - Generals	Green Bay Elite All Stars - Lime
Senior Medium All-Girl Level 5	Spirit of Texas - Royalty	Maryland Twisters - Reign	Rockstar Cheer - The Beatles
Senior Large All-Girl Level 5	Maryland Twisters - F5	The Stingray All Stars - Orange	Cheer Athletics - Panthers
Senior Small Coed Level 5	Brandon All Stars - Senior Black	Vizion Allstars - 20/20	Prodigy All Stars - Midnight
Senior Medium Coed Level 5	Spirit of Texas - Royalty	Maryland Twisters - Reign	Rockstar Cheer - The Beatles
Senior Large Coed Level 5	Cheer Athletics - Cheetahs	The Stingray Allstars - Steel	The California All Stars - Cali Coed
International Open All-Girl Level 5	The California All Stars - Sparkle	Cheer Extreme - IAGX Cougars	Cheer Sport Sharks - Great White Sharks (Canada)
International Open Coed Small Level 5	Cheer Athletics - Swooshcats	Stars Vipers - Anacondas	Spirit of Texas - Remix
International Open Coed Large Level 5	Cheer Athletics - Wildcats	The California All Stars - Ghost Recon	The Stingray All Stars - Electric
International Open All-Girl Level 6	GymTyme All Stars Golden Girls	Viqueens - Spirit	Flyers All-Starz - Karma
International Open Coed Small Level 6	GymTyme Allstars - Jade	The California All Stars - Team Reckless	Vancouver All Stars - Ice Out
International Open Coed Large Level 6	Cheer Athletics - Claw6	SCC - Lagacy	Flyers All-Starz - Shock

Dance Results:
Division	Gold	Silver	Bronze
International Junior Dance	Dancer's Edge Studio	The Vision Dance Center	Dancin’ Bluebonnets
Senior Small Hip Hop	Legendary Athletics North Florida	Jordan Johnson Productions - Fierce Kids	Eastern Washington Elite House of 509
Senior Large Hip Hop	Extreme All Stars	Perfection All Stars - Eminence	Legendary Athletics North Florida
Senior Small Coed Hip Hop	Dance Force Studios - Vitality	Pittsburgh Poison - Dart Frogs	Champion Legacy
Senior Large Coed Hip Hop	Extreme All Stars Florida	Pittsburgh Poison - Cyanide	Star Performance Centre
Senior Small Jazz	PACE Elite	The Vision Dance Center	Dancin’ Bluebonnets
Senior Large Jazz	Dancer's Edge Studio	Dance Dynamics	Music City Allstars
Senior Small Pom	Cheers Factory - Departures	South Coast Freestyle	PACE Elite
Senior Large Pom	Energizers Dance Team	Dancin’ Bluebonnets	Dancer's Edge Studio
International Open Hip Hop	Jordan Johnson Productions - Fly	Champion Legacy	Intros Allstars
International Open Coed Hip Hop	Next Level Dance Co - Supremacy	Extreme All Stars	ADA - Dark Angels
International Open Male Hip Hop	Jordan Johnson Productions - Crew	Misfit Dance Company - The Fraternity	Chinese Taipei Cheerleading Assoc
International Open Jazz	The Vision Dance Center	Dancin’ Bluebonnets	Dance Dynamics
International Open Coed Jazz	Dance Dynamics	PACE Elite	Rocheer & Factory All-Stars
International Open Pom	Energizers Dance Team	PACE Elite	ABE Dance Promotion - Blue Force
International Open Coed Pom	Rocheer & Factory All-Stars	PACE Elite	Energizers Dance Team

== 2017 ==
The 2017 Cheerleading and Dance Worlds was held from April 29 to May 1, 2017, at Walt Disney World, Orlando, Florida. Cheerleading divisions continued to be held at the ESPN Wide World of Sports complex while this marked the second year that dance divisions were held at Disney's Coronado Springs Resort and Convention Center.

Cheerleading preliminaries were held in the senior small and senior medium division for both all-girl and coed teams with at large bids in these divisions. Once again, the senior small and senior small co-ed divisions saw a group A and B split with the top 10 from each group advancing to semi finals. US worlds trial cheerleading preliminaries were held in the international open small coed 5 and international large coed 5 divisions, with Canadian worlds trial cheerleading preliminaries being held in the international open all-girl 5 category. The top 10 from each country's worlds trial advanced to the worlds international semi-finals.

Dance preliminaries were held for all U.S. teams entering in the international open hip hop and international open coed hip hop divisions. These preliminaries were named the U.S. World Trials. Preliminaries were also required for all U.S. dance teams entering the senior hip hop category. The top 10 teams from these rounds progressed to division semi-finals to compete against all other non-U.S. teams within these divisions. Semi-finals were held for all senior dance divisions, international open divisions and junior dance divisions. A minimum of 50% of the senior teams progressed from semi-finals to finals, where as only the top three teams from each countries advanced in the international open and junior dance divisions.

Athletes competing at The Dance Worlds were limited to competing in a maximum of four dance routines representing the same dance program. Athletes were not allowed to crossover between dance programs/studios/gyms or between cheerleading and dance teams/studios/gyms. If a team was found to have breached the cross over rules, they would be disqualified from both this year's event as well as disqualified from receiving a bid for the following year, as well as having to repay any funds received through any paid bid.

This was the first year that contemporary/lyrical was offered as its own defined dance division, offered in both the senior and open age divisions.

=== Results ===
Cheer Results
Division	Gold	Silver	Bronze
Senior Small All-Girl Level 5	ICE- Lady Lightning	Woodlands Elite - Generals	Central Jersey All Stars - Bombshells
Senior Medium All-Girl Level 5	East Celebrity Elite- M5 Bombshells	Spirit of Texas- A-Team	Top Gun All Stars Miami - Lady Jags
Senior Large All-Girl Level 5	World Cup- Shooting Stars	Cheer Athletics- Panthers	Cheer Extreme - Senior Elite
Senior Small Coed Level 5	Brandon All-Stars - Senior Black	Prodigy All Stars - Midnight	KC Cheer - Fierce Five
Senior Medium Coed Level 5	The California All Stars - Black Ops	Rockstar Cheer - Beatles	Cheer Extreme - SMOEX
Senior Large Coed Level 5	The Stingray All Stars - Steel	Cheer Athletics - Cheetahs	Top Gun All Stars Miami - TGLC
International Open All-Girl Level 5	Flyers All-Starz - Knockout	Cheer Sport Sharks - Great White Sharks	The California All Stars - Sparkle
International Open Coed Small Level 5	Cheer Athletics - Swooshcats	Pirates Athletics - Golden Gun	The Stingray All Stars - Electric
International Open Coed Large Level 5	CheerForce - Nfinity	Top Gun All Stars Miami - OO5	Cheer Athletics - Wildcats
International Open All-Girl Level 6	GymTyme All Stars - Gold	Flyers All Starz	Gothenburg Cheer One - Wildcats
International Open Coed Small Level 6	Top Gun All Stars Miami - IOC-6	The California All Stars - Reckless	GymTyme All-Stars
International Open Coed Large Level 6	GymTyme All-Stars - Chrome	Cheer Athletics - Claw6	Southern Cross Cheerleading - SCC Legacy

Dance Results:
Division	Gold	Silver	Bronze
Junior Dance (Open)	Dancer's Edge Studio - Junior Lyrical	The Vision Dance Center	ABE Dance Promotion - Blue Star
Senior Contemporary/Lyrical	Dance Dynamics	Dancin Bluebonnets - Senior Lyrical	Dance Precisions - Contemporary
Senior Small Hip Hop	Legendary Athletics North Florida	Champion Legacy	Xtreme Dance California
Senior Large Hip Hop	Dollhouse Dance Factory	Star Performance Centre	Pittsburgh Poison All Stars
Senior Small Coed Hip Hop	Extreme All Stars Florida	Legendary Athletics North Florida	Eastern Washington Elite House of 509
Senior Large Coed Hip Hop	Extreme All Stars Florida	Pittsburgh Poison	Victory Vipers
Senior Small Jazz	Dancer's Edge Studio - Senior Small Jazz	Dancin Bluebonnets	The Vision Dance Center
Senior Large Jazz	Dance Dynamics	The Vision Dance Center	Star Performance Centre
Senior Small Pom	Cheers Factory	PACE Elite - Darkness Falls	South Coast Freestyle
Senior Large Pom	Starz Dance Academy	PACE Elite	South Coast Freestyle
Open Contemporary/Lyrical	Dance Dynamics	TIE Dancin Bluebonnets & Mt. Eden Ballet Academy	
Open Hip Hop	Team Philipinas	South Jersey Storm - Black Ice	Almaden Spirit Athletics - Paragon
Open Coed Hip Hop	World Wings	ADA Dark Angels	Top Gun All Stars Miami
Open Male Hip Hop	Pittsburgh Poison All Stars - King Cobras	Texas Cheer Allstars - D Towne Boogie	Tanz Regens
Open Jazz	The Vision Dance Center	Dancin Bluebonnets	Wing Dance Promotion
Open Coed Jazz	Dance Factory	Dance Dynamics	PACE Elite
Open Pom	Planets Dance Company - Planets	Energizers Dance Team - Energizers Open Pom	PACE Elite - Freedom
Open Coed Pom	PACE Elite - If You Want	Energizers Dance Team	Dance Factory

== 2018 ==
The Cheerleading and Dance Worlds 2018 took place at Walt Disney World, Orlando, Florida, between April 28 and 30, 2018. Cheerleading divisions were held at the ESPN Wide World of Sports complex, with dance divisions being held at Disney's Coronado Springs Resort and Convention Center.

In 2018, senior extra small all-girl level 5 and senior extra small coed level 5 divisions were now eligible for worlds, with some stipulations. These stipulations included that a program could only have one extra small team, either all-girl or coed, and that if a program received a bid in either senior extra small all-girl or senior extra small coed, the program may not compete in any other division or alternatively, the extra small division team must compete in the senior small division.

World trials were held for Canadian teams in the international open all-girl level 5 division and international open small coed level 5 and for US teams in international open small coed 5, international large coed level 5 to advance the top 10 teams to the international division semi-finals.

=== Results ===
Cheer Results
Division	Gold	Silver	Bronze
Senior All-Girl Extra small Level 5	Cheer Express Allstars - Miss Silver	Green Bay Elite All-Stars - Lime	Elite Cheer - Stars
Senior Small All-Girl Level 5	Cheer Extreme - Raleigh - SSX	Woodlands Elite - Generals	The California All Stars- San Marcos - Lady Bullets
Senior Medium All-Girl Level 5	Top Gun All Stars Miami - Lady Jags	FAME All Stars - Super Seniors	The Stingray All Stars Marietta - Peach
Senior Large All-Girl Level 5	Cheer Athletics - Panthers	World Cup - Shooting Stars	The Stingray All Stars Marietta - Orange
Senior Coed Extra Small Level 5	University Cheer Force - UCF Firestorm	Maine Stars - Glory	SCV All Stars - X 5
Senior Small Coed Level 5	The California All Stars - Camarillo - SMOED	Twist & Shout Tulsa - Diamonds	Central Jersey All Stars - Team Gunz
Senior Medium Coed Level 5	The California All Stars - Livermore - Black Ops	Spirit of Texas - Royalty	Woodlands Elite - Black Ops
Senior Large Coed Level 5	Cheer Athletics - Cheetahs	Top Gun All Stars Miami - TGLC	The Stingray All Stars Marietta - Steel
International Open All-Girl Level 5	Cheer Sport Sharks - Cambridge - Great White Sharks	Flyers All Starz - Knockout	GymTyme All-Stars - Pink
International Open Coed Small Level 5	Prodigy All Stars - Blacklight	Cheer Athletics - Swooshcats	Brandon All-Stars - Smoke
International Open Coed Large Level 5	Top Gun All Stars Miami - OO5	Cheer Athletics - Wildcats	Flyers All Starz - Notorious
International Open All-Girl Level 6	Flyers All Starz - Karma	Viqueens Cheerleaders - Viqueens Spirit	Gothenburg Cheer One - Wildcats
International Open Coed Small Level 6	The California All Stars (Camarillo) - Reckless	Top Gun All Stars Miami - SICk 6	Flyers All Starz - Lightning
International Open Coed Large Level 6	Cheer Athletics - Claw6	The California All Stars- San Marcos - Rangers	Fire All Stars

Dance Results:
Division	Gold	Silver	Bronze
Junior Dance (Open)	Jexer Fitness Club Omiya – Zingys	Dancer's Edge Studio – Junior Jazz	The Vision Dance Center
Senior Contemporary/Lyrical	Dancer's Edge Studio – Senior Small	The Vision Dance Center	Dancin’ Bluebonnets
Senior Small Hip Hop	Pittsburgh Pride All Stars – Ambush	Legendary Athletics North Florida – Senior Elite	Pittsburgh Poison All Stars – Nyah
Senior Large Hip Hop	Pittsburgh Pride All Stars – Coalition	Star Performance Centre – Senior Large All Girl	Dollhouse Dance Factory – Sirens
Senior Small Coed Hip Hop	Golden Hawks – Senior	Legendary Athletics – Senior Coed Elite	Goddesses Dance Team
Senior Large Coed Hip Hop	Star Performance Centre – Senior Large Coed Hip Hop	Imperial Athletics - Monarch	Champion Legacy - Senior Coed Hip Hop
Senior Small Jazz	Champion Legacy – Sr Jazz	The Vision Dance Center	Dance Mania
Senior Large Jazz	Dancer's Edge Studio – Senior Large Jazz	Dancin’ Bluebonnets	Dance Dynamics - Senior Large Jazz
Senior Small Pom	Cheers Factory – Inspire	Dance Mania	Energizers
Senior Large Pom	Champion Legacy – Large Senior Pom	Star Performance Centre – Senior Large Pom	Silver Wings Aile – Wing Dance Promotion
Open Contemporary/Lyrical	The Vision Dance Center	Dance Dynamics	Dancin’ Bluebonnets
Open Hip Hop	Team Philipinas	UIS	Angels Dance Academy - Dominion
Open Coed Hip Hop	World Wings	Midrash Dance Centre	Gold Star - Team X
Open Male Hip Hop	Pittsburgh Poison All Stars – King Cobras	Velocity Dance - Werewolves	Elite Legends of Ohio - The Veterans
Open Jazz	Dancin’ Bluebonnets	Dance Dynamics - Open Jazz	The Vision Dance Center
Open Coed Jazz	Dance Factory	Strut Performing Arts	Music City All Stars
Open Pom	Energizers Dance Team	Wing Dance Production – Silver Wings	Golden Hawks
Open Coed Pom	Dance Factory	Energizers Dance Team	Strut Performing Arts - Open Coed Pom

== 2019 ==
The 2019 Cheerleading and Dance Worlds was held 27–29 April 2019 at Walt Disney World.

This year saw the introduction of a range of new US only cheerleading divisions, including senior open level 5, senior open small coed level 5 and senior open large coed level 5 divisions. A relaxation was also made in the US only senior extra small all-girl and senior extra small coed divisions, allowing for any program regardless of number of worlds teams to field a team in this division.

New international cheerleading divisions were also introduced, bringing in non-tumbling divisions and global cheer divisions that included crowd-leading cheer alongside the cheer routine. These divisions were introduced for level 5, in both all-girl and co-ed divisions.

Dance divisions also saw a shakeup, with a split occurring between small and large teams in the senior contemporary/lyrical division, as well as a division split between elite and premier hip hop teams in open hip hop and open coed hip hop. Kick was also introduced for the first time as a dance style category.

Preliminaries were held for at-large bid winners in the senior extra small and senior small categories for both all-girl and coed teams.

=== Results ===
Cheer Results
Division	Gold	Silver	Bronze
Senior All-Girl Extra small Level 5	Cheer Central Suns - Lady Suns	Twist & Shout Edmond	Central Jersey All Stars - Bombshells
Senior Small All-Girl Level 5	Cheer Extreme - Raleigh - SSX	Woodlands Elite - Generals	The California All Stars (San Marcos) - Lady Bullets
Senior Medium All-Girl Level 5	East Celebrity Elite - M5 Bombshells	Top Gun All Stars Miami - Lady Jags	The Stingray All Stars - Peach
Senior Large All-Girl Level 5	World Cup - Shooting Stars	Cheer Extreme - Senior Elite	Cheer Athletics (Plano) - Panthers
Senior Open All-Girl Level 5	Infinity All Stars - Royals	Spirit of Texas - Lady Reign	The Stingray All Stars - Apple
Senior Coed Extra Small Level 5	GymTyme Illinois - Fever	CheerVille Athletics - Anarchy	ICE - Thunder
Senior Small Coed Level 5	Prodigy All Stars - Midnight	Brandon All-Stars - Senior Black	Central Jersey All Stars - Team Gunz
Senior Medium Coed Level 5	The California All Stars Livermore - Black Ops	Woodlands Elite - Black Ops	Cheer Extreme - Coed Elite
Senior Large Coed Level 5	The Stingray All Stars - Steel	Top Gun All Stars Miami - TGLC	Cheer Athletics (Plano) - Cheetahs
Senior Open Coed Small Level 5	Rockstar Cheer - The Beatles	Cheer Extreme Raleigh - Cougar Coed	The California All Stars (Las Vegas) - ACES
Senior Open Coed Large Level 5	Cheer Athletics (Plano) - Wildcats	Stars Vipers (San Antonio) - Anacondas	Charlotte Allstar Cheerleading - Teal
International Open All-Girl Level 5	Cheer Sport Sharks - Great White Sharks	The California All Stars (San Marcos) - Sparkles	Rising Stars - Ellipse
International Open All-Girl Global Level 5	Flyers All-Starz - Knockout	Cheer Athletics (Plano) - Ladycats	Vancouver All Stars - Ice Queens
International Open All-Girl Non-Tumbling Level 5	Cheer Extreme - Lady Lux	Flyers All-Starz - Fearless	ACE Athletics - Vicious
International Open Coed Small Level 5	Indiana Ultimate - Insanity	CheerForce (San Diego) - Blackout	Coventry Dynamite - Ammunition
International Open Coed Large Level 5	TIE CheerForce (San Diego) - Nfinity & Top Gun All Stars (Miami) - OO5	Outlaws Allstars - Notorious (Australia)	PCT - Temptation
International Open Coed Global Level 5	Flyers All-Starz - Notorious	The California All Stars - Ghost Recon	Rockstar Cheer - Rolling Stones
International Open Coed Non-Tumbling Level 5	Cheer Extreme Raleigh - Code Black	Louisiana Cheer Force - Slate	Cheer Athletics (Charlotte) - Thronecats
International Open All-Girl Level 6	Flyers All-Starz - Karma	Cheer Sport Sharks - Grey Reef Sharks	GymTyme All Stars - Gold
International Open Coed Small Level 6	The California All Stars (Camarillo) - TeamRECKLESS	Top Gun All Stars Miami - SICk6	Flyers All-Starz - Lightning
International Open Coed Large Level 6	The California All Stars (San Marcos) - Rangers	Pirates Athletics - Black Flag	Cheer Athletics - Claw6

Dance Results:
Division	Gold	Silver	Bronze
Junior Dance (Open)	C*Star - JD	SPG Dance Project - H Beat Beans	Dancer's Edge Studio - Junior Small Jazz
Senior Small Contemporary/Lyrical	Dancer's Edge Studio - Senior Small Contemporary	Dancin’ Bluebonnets - Senior Contemporary	Star Steppers - Star Steppers Dance
Senior Large Contemporary/Lyrical	Dancer's Edge Studio - Senior Large Contemporary	Dance Dynamics - Senior Contemporary	The Vision Dance Center - Senior Allstars
Senior Small Hip Hop	Legendary Athletics North Florida - SSHH	Pittsburgh Pride All Stars - Ambush	Next Level Dance Co - Goddesses
Senior Large Hip Hop	Dollhouse Dance Factory - Hustle	Pittsburgh Poison All Stars - Black Widows	Champion Legacy - SLHH
Senior Small Coed Hip Hop	Power of Dance LLC - Polaris Wings	Ultimate Allstars - Red Thunder	Strut Performing Arts - SSCHH
Senior Large Coed Hip Hop	Imperial Athletics - Monarch	Pittsburgh Poison All Stars - Cyanide	Studio L Dance Co - SLCHH
Senior Small Jazz	Dance Mania - SSJ	Dancin’ Bluebonnets - SSJ	The Vision Dance Center - Senior Allstars
Senior Large Jazz	Dancer's Edge Studio - SLJ	Dance Dynamics - SLJ	Wing Dance Promotion - Silver Wings Aile
Senior Small Pom	Cheers Factory - Evolution	Energizers Dance Team - Energizers SSP	Dance Mania - SSP
Senior Large Pom	Champion Legacy - SLP	Energizers Dance Team - Energizers SLP	Power of Dance LLC - Warriors
Open Contemporary/Lyrical	The Vision Dance Center - Open Allstars	Dance Dynamics - Open Lyrical	Dance Mania - Open Contemporary
Open Elite Hip Hop	Dollhouse Dance Factory	Legendary Athletics North Florida - Open Elite	Footnotes Dance Studio - Footnotes Fusion
Open Elite Coed Hip Hop	Angels Dance Academy - ADA Dark Angels	Next Level Dance Co - Supremacy	Strut Performing Arts - Open Coed Hip Hop
Open Premier Hip Hop	Team Philipinas - Assumption College San Lorenzo	Angels Dance Academy - ADA Dominion	West Coast Royalty - OPHH
Open Premier Coed Hip Hop	World Wings - 2WDC	Dance Factory OCPHH	Top Gun All Stars Miami - TG OHH
Open Male Hip Hop	Velocity Dance - Wolfpack	Adrenaline Allstars - Rush Crew	Pittsburgh Poison All Stars - King Cobras
Open Kick	Energizers Dance Team - Energizers OK	Power of Dance LLC Indus - Knock on Wood	Foursis Dance Academy - Dazzler Dance Team
Open Jazz	The Vision Dance Center - Open Allstars	Wing Dance Promotion Silver Wings - OJ	Dancin’ Bluebonnets - OJ
Open Coed Jazz	Dance Factory - OCJ	Dancin’ Bluebonnets - OCJ	Strut Performing Arts - OCJ
Open Pom	Planets Dance Company - Planets OP	Wing Dance Promotion Silver Wings - OP	Energizers Dance Team - Energizers OP
Open Coed Pom	Dance Factory - OCP	Pacific Elite Dance - Mystics	Velocity Dance - WOOP

== 2020 ==
The 2020 Cheerleading and Dance Worlds were originally scheduled to take place April 24–27, 2020.

As part of the intended scheduled competition, USASF and IASF had adjusted division levels, with level 5 restricted becoming level 5, level 5 becoming level 6 and level 6 becoming level 7. IASF had intended to add level 5 divisions to the event as a result, including International Open All-Girl Level 5, International Open Small Coed Level 5, and International Open Large Coed Level 5. They also planned to add International Open All-Girl Non-Tumbling Level 7 and International Open Non-Tumbling Coed Level 7. The new level 5 and non-tumbling level 7 divisions were restricted to only non-U.S. based teams.

However, due to the impact of the global COVID-19 pandemic, the USASF announced on April 23, 2020, that the event was cancelled.

Before announcing the cancellation, USASF had sent an email to gym owners and coaches exploring the possibility of postponing the event until the last week of June 2020, which ultimately did not go ahead.

IASF did not cancel their divisions outright for the year at the time of the USASF cancellation, instead postponing with the hope of running a September event in conjunction with the ICU World Championships. However, by May 2020, it became apparent that would not be viable, leading to IASF director, Les Stella, issuing an official notice of cancellation. At the time, they also announced they would be extending the junior division ages a year, in order for any 2020 IASF junior-aged athlete to be eligible to compete in 2021.

Controversy broke out surrounding the USASF cancellation due to the news being leaked before a public announcement. USASF sent a confidential email to gym/studio owners and coaches the night before a planned public announcement, explaining their cancellation decision, with the intent of allowing gym owners and coaches to disseminate that information among their worlds athletes and families before the public was aware. The owner of the cheer news updates site, "Cheer Updates", DJ Yeager, was a cheer coach who also received this email, publishing the news to his Cheer Updates site shortly after receiving the email, before USASF had made their public announcement. This was the first that some athletes and families had heard of the cancellation, as their programs had not yet informed them, causing wide-scale controversy and confusion in the time before USASF made their announcement.

== 2021 ==
The Cheerleading and Dance Worlds 2021 was the first year that saw an event go ahead with USASF and IASF running their worlds events separately as a result of travel restrictions associated with COVID-19.

For 2021, the level changes that had been intended to be implemented for IASF governed cheerleading divisions at the cancelled 2020 event were enacted. In October 2018, IASF announced an introduction of a level 7 division for the 2020 world championships, with level 5 restricted becoming level 5, level 5 becoming level 6 and level 6 becoming level 7. This had an impact on the divisions offered at both events held this year.

=== 2021 USASF Worlds ===
The USASF Cheerleading and Dance Worlds took place between May 6–10, 2021, at the ESPN Wide World of Sports Complex, Walt Disney World, Florida. Instead of running concurrently, the Dance Worlds divisions ran first on May 6 and 7, 2021, while the Cheerleading Worlds divisions ran on May 8–10, 2021, in order to reduce crowds as a protective measure against COVID-19. Due to international travel restrictions, this event was restricted to only teams from the U.S. competing.

In recognition of the impact that COVID-19 had on teams being able to attend events to earn a worlds bid, USASF introduced applicant bids for this event only. This allowed teams that attended at least three 2020-21 USASF-sanctioned competitions, one of which must have been a 2021 worlds bid qualifying event, to apply for a bid. If approved, this was treated as an "at-large" bid, with teams paying for their own worlds registration packages and all other expenses.

Exceptions were also made to the cheer athlete bid limitations for the 2021 event only due to the uncertainty around COVID-19, with the number of athletes that previously earned a paid bid, and were eligible to compete for and be awarded a paid bid on a second team were not held to compete with the second team. The number of athletes eligible for this exception per team ranged from 1-3 depending on the size of the team/division.

Crossover rules were altered for this year as an exception to the normal rule, allowing crossover of athletes between dance and cheer teams, allowing an athlete to compete in both The Cheerleading Worlds and The Dance Worlds for the first time in the event's history. The number of times an athlete was allowed to perform was also increased, with an athlete now allowed to perform up to five times. Crossovers between dance programs remained prohibited at this event.

Preliminary rounds were held for teams in teams competing in the senior extra small all-girl level 6, senior extra small coed level 6 and senior open small coed level 6 divisions.

All dance teams competed in semi-finals in each division and category. A minimum of 50% of teams in the senior divisions advanced to finals, with the top three teams from each country in the IASF open and junior divisions advancing to finals.

==== Results ====
Cheer Results
Division	Gold	Silver	Bronze
Senior All-Girl Extra small Level 5	Pacific Coast Magic - Irvine Fearless	The California All Stars Mesa - Vixens	University Cheer Force Firestorm
Senior Small All-Girl Level 5	Cheer Extreme Raleigh -SSX	ICE Lady Lightning	The California All Stars San Marcos - Lady Bullets
Senior Medium All-Girl Level 5	The Stingray All Stars - Peach	Woodlands Elite - OR Generals	Top Gun All Stars Miami - Lady Jags
Senior Large All-Girl Level 5	The Stingray All Stars - Orange	Cheer Extreme - Senior Elite	World Cup - Shooting Stars
Senior Open All-Girl Level 5	The Central Jersey All Stars - Bombshells	Stars Vipers San Antonio - Miss Hiss	The Stingray All Stars - Apple
Senior Coed Extra Small Level 5	Gym Tyme Illinois - Fever	Twist & Shout Tulsa -Diamonds	Upper Merion All Stars Royals
Senior Small Coed Level 5	Brandon All Stars - Senior Black	Cheer Extreme - Coed Elite	Prodigy All Stars - Midnight
Senior Medium Coed Level 5	Woodlands Elite - OR Black Ops	The California All Stars Livermore - Black Ops	Cheer Extreme Raleigh - SMOEX
Senior Large Coed Level 5	Top Gun All Stars Miami - TGLC	The Stingray All Stars - Steel	Cheer Athletics Plano - Cheetahs
Senior Open Small Coed Level 5	Rockstar Cheer - Beatles	The Stingray All Stars - Electric	CheerVille Athletics HV - Anarchy
Senior Open Large Coed Level 5	Cheer Athletics Plano - Wildcats	The California All Stars San Marcos - Cali Coed	Uknight Training Center - Royals
International Global Club All-Girl Level 6	Cheer Athletic Plano - Ladycats	The Atlanta Jayhawks - Shade	The Stingray All Stars - Cobalt
International Global Club Coed Level 6	Cheer Athletics Plano - Crewcats	GymTyme Allstars - Platinum	Arizona Element Elite - Vibranium
International Open All-Girl Level 6	FAME All Stars Midlo - Super Seniors	Rockstar Cheer Pittsburgh - PlatinumCats	The Stingray All Stars - Lavender
International Open Small Coed Level 6	The California All Stars Livermore - Ghost Recon	Top Gun All Stars Miami - Revelation	Prodigy All Stars - Blacklight
International Open Large Coed Level 6	TIE Cheer Athletics Charlotte - RoyalCats & Top Gun All Stars Miami - Double O		TIE Stars Vipers San Antonio - Anacondas & USA Starz - Reign
International Open All-Girl Non-Tumbling Level 6	Cheer Central Suns - Lady Aurora	The California All Stars San Marcos - Sparkle	Cheer Extreme - Lady Lux
International Open Coed Non-Tumbling Level 6	Brandon All Stars - Legacy	Diamonds All Stars - Showtime	Cheer Extreme Raleigh - Coed Black
International Open All-Girl Level 7	GymTyme All Stars - Gold	OC All Stars - Neon	JPAC Radiance - Ultraviolet
International Open Small Coed Level 7	CheerForce San Diego - Nfinity	The California All Stars Camarillo - Reckless	Ultimate Cheer Lubbock - Royal Court

Dance Results:
Division	Gold	Silver	Bronze
Junior Dance (Open)	Fully Loaded Dance Studio - Ridiculous	Dancin’ Bluebonnets - Junior Jazz	The Vision Dance Centre - Junior Allstars
Senior Small Contemporary/Lyrical	Dance Mania - Senior Lyrical	The Vision Dance Center - Senior Small Lyrical	Dancer's Edge Studio
Senior Large Contemporary/Lyrical	Dancin Bluebonnets - Senior Lyrical	Dance Dynamics	Music City Allstars - Senior Large Lyrical
Senior Small Hip Hop	Imperial Athletics - Stellar	Pittsburgh Pride All Stars - Ambush	Legendary Athletics - Senior Elite
Senior Large Hip Hop	Dollhouse Dance Factory - Run This Town	Star Performance Centre - Large All Girl Hip Hop	Pittsburgh Poison All Stars - Black Widows
Senior Small Coed Hip Hop	Pittsburgh Poison All Stars - Dart Frogs	The Source Dance Lab - Assassins	Footnotes Fusion - High Definition
Senior Large Coed Hip Hop	Ultimate All Stars - Red Thunder	Pittsburgh Poison All Stars - Cyanide	ICE - Aftermath
Senior Small Jazz	Dance Mania - Senior Jazz Small	Brookfield Center for the Arts - BCA Senior All Stars	Dancin Bluebonnets - Senior Jazz
Senior Large Jazz	The Vision Dance Center - Senior Large Jazz	Dancer's Edge Studio	Dance Mania - Senior Jazz Large
Senior Small Pom	Dance Mania - Senior Pom Small	South Coast Freestyle - Temperature	Energizers
Senior Large Pom	Dance Mania - Senior Pom Large	Champion Legacy - All Star Pom	Dance Dynamics
Open Open	Dance Dynamics	Dancin Bluebonnets - Open Lyrical	CheerForce Arizona - ACES DanceForce AZ
Open Elite Hip Hop	Footnotes Fusion - Priority	Adrenaline Allstars - RAGE	Dollhouse Dance Factory - Interstellar
Open Elite Coed Hip Hop	Next Level Dance Co - Supremacy	Footnotes Fusion - Take Off	Pittsburgh Poison All Stars - Open Elite
Open Premier Hip Hop	Dollhouse Dance Factory - The Dream		
Open Premier Coed Hip Hop	Top Gun All Stars - Open Hip Hop	Adrenaline Allstars - Fusion	Dollhouse Dance Factory - Low
Open Male Hip Hop	Stars Vipers - San Antonio - King Serpents	EPA AllStars - Kingdom	Adrenaline Allstars - Havoc
Open Kick	Power of Dance - Americano	Energizers	Foursis Dance Academy - Dazzler Dance Team
Open Jazz	The Vision Dance Center	Energizers	Dance Etc Inc
Open Coed Jazz	5678! Dance Studio - Open All Stars		
Open Pom	South Coast Freestyle - Bad	Energizers	Starz Dance Academy - Elite All Stars
Open Coed Pom	Velocity Dance - WOOP	Intensity Athletics - Cobras	

=== 2021 IASF Worlds ===
With the aim of making some level of participation available for athletes around the globe, IASF announced in February 2021 that they were working to secure dates in September 2021 for the IASF Worlds Championship events for both cheerleading and dance. At that time in February, they were also considering a virtual 2021 option, as well as a hybrid format allowing for both in-person and virtual categories. However, it was announced in June 2021 that due to ongoing restrictions and the impact of the COVID-19 pandemic, the IASF Worlds would take place virtually in 2021.

Due to the ongoing impact, the announcement was made by IASF in July that they would be hosting the event virtually on October 1–2, 2021, with teams submitting videos of a "semi-final" and "finals" performance taken inside of a consecutive three-day window via the CheerMatch app, that would be scored by the judges.

Eligible cheerleading teams included all teams who had earned a bid to the cancelled 2020 Worlds event, as well as any bids earned for the 2021 event. Level 7 Cheerleading teams were not required to earn a bid to enter, with it open to all, and no substitute rule and regulations were enforced at this event. Due to the impact of COVID-19, IASF allowed U17 (Junior) and U19 (Senior) teams to have an extra year of eligibility at the upper end of their age ranges to recognise the athletes who had aged out never finishing their final year.

Eligible dance teams included both U.S. and non-U.S. dance teams that had earned a 2020 or 2021 Worlds' bid in the International, Open or Junior division, with non-U.S. junior division teams being exempt from earning a bid to participate. In recognition of COVID-19 restrictions and their impacts on countries holding qualifying competitions, a team was also allowed to apply for an at-large bid based on their 2019–2020 season history if they did not have an existing bid.

To accommodate the virtual format, upon registration, teams selected a three-day window between September 1 and September 22 in which to record and submit routines via the CheerMatch Capture App. During their three-day period, teams were allotted two capture opportunities for two different performances, in which they could choose the best capture for each, and designate one performance for "semi-finals" and the other for "finals".

Judges scored all semi-final performances in each division on October 1, with the top three teams from each country in each division advancing to the finals round, where the pre-recorded performances were judged on October 2 to determine the champions.

==== Results ====
Cheer Results
Division	Gold	Silver	Bronze
International Open All-Girl Level 5	Southern Cross Cheer - Lady Reign (Australia)	Zodiac Allstars - Pink (UK)	All Star Cheerleaders New Zealand - Glamkatz (New Zealand)
International Open Small Coed Level 5	Inspire Athletics - Fame (Australia)	Cheer Sport Sharks - Spotted Sharks (Canada)	Sparks Cheerleading - Blackout (Canada)
International Open Large Coed Level 5	Hero All Stars - Super Hero Latina (Chile)	Paris Cheer - Legacy (France)	Perfect Storm Athletics Edmonton - Lightning (Canada)
International Open All-Girl Level 6	Outlaws All Stars - Kelly Girls (Australia)	Cheer Sport Sharks - Great White Sharks (Canada)	Rockstar Cheer Pittsburgh - Supermodels (USA)
International Open Small Coed Level 6	Bigair Cheer Elite - New Zealand	X3 Cheer & Gymnastics Academy - Black Diamonds (Mexico)	
International Open Large Coed Level 6	Outlaws All Stars - Notorious (Australia)	Oxygen All Stars - Immortal (Australia)	
International Open All-Girl Non-Tumbling Level 6	Cheer Extreme - Lady Lux (USA)	Flyers All Starz - Fearless (Canada)	Cheer Sport Sharks - Copper Sharks (Canada)
International Open Coed Non-Tumbling Level 6	ACE Athletics - Riot (Canada)	Cheer Extreme Raleigh - Code Black (USA)	Southern Cross Cheer-Interstellar (Australia)
International Global Club All-Girl Level 6	Flyers All Starz – Knockout (Canada)	Cheer Sport Sharks - Smallfin Sharks (Canada)	
International Global Club Coed Level 6	Flyers All Starz - Notorious (Canada)	KC Cheer - Fireball (USA)	
International Open All-Girl Level 7	Vancouver All Stars - Blackout (Canada)	Cheer Sport Sharks - Grey Reef Sharks (Canada)	
International Open Small Coed Level 7	Melbourne Cheer Academy - Phoenix (Australia)		
International Open Large Coed Level 7	Southern Cross Cheer - Legacy (Australia)	UPAC All Stars - Super Panthers (Chile)	The Stingray Allstars Marietta - Rust (USA)
International Open All Girl Non-Tumbling Level 7	Flyers All Starz - Karma (Canada)	Flyers All Starz - Legends (Canada)	UPAC All Stars - Miss Panthers (Chile)
International Open Coed Non-Tumbling Level 7	Vancouver All Stars - Black Ice (Canada)	Cheer Extreme DMV - Savage (USA)	

Dance Results:
Division	Gold	Silver	Bronze
Junior Dance (Open)	YDC Dance Studio - Lapis DIO (Japan)	PinkDiamonds - Glanz (Japan)	TeamATLAS - altasRISE (Japan)
Open Open	Mellow (Japan)	Ultimate Dance Centre - Womans Work (Australia)	DSF - Brillants (Japan)
Open Elite Hip Hop	UiS (Japan)	Kashiwa - Golden Hawks (Japan)	Entourage Elite - Defiance (UK)
Open Elite Coed Hip Hop	Hy-Fidelity Dance Design - Supreme Krew (Australia)	Cheer Power Extreme - Convergence (Australia)	
Open Premier Hip Hop	Bradshaw Dance and Cheer - Bradshaw Elite (Australia)	KCD - VisionCrew (Norway)	
Open Kick	Energizers (USA)		
Open Jazz	Ultimate Dance Centre - The Chase (Australia)	Empire Dance Studio - Eminence (Australia)	TIE Bradshaw Dance and Cheer - Bradshaw Elite (Australia) & Dahlia (Japan)
Open Pom	Kawai Dance Agency - Queen Berry (Japan)	Energizers (USA)	Cheers Factory - Ambitious (Japan)
Open Coed Pom	Cheer Power Extreme - Supremacy (Australia)	Selatan Dance (Chile)	

== 2022 ==
The 2022 Cheerleading and Dance Worlds event returned to its regular in person format, with IASF and USASF worlds being held as part of the same event. This competition was held between April 23 to 25, 2022 at Walt Disney World Resort, with cheerleading divisions returning to the ESPN Wide World of Sports Complex, and dance divisions returning to Coronado Springs Resort and Convention Centre.

Cheerleading preliminaries were held at this event for teams with at large bid in the senior extra small all-girl, senior extra small coed, senior open small coed, international open all-girl non-tumbling level 6 and international open coed non-tumbling level 6 divisions. The top 10 teams from the preliminary rounds advanced to compete in the semi-final round along with teams who held partially paid and fully paid bids. The change was made in round advancements this year that if 40 or more teams competed in a division's preliminary round or semi-final round, then 15 teams would move forward to the next round of the competition instead of the traditional 10 teams.

However, only senior small hip hop teams that held at-large bids competed in dance division preliminaries, with a minimum of 50% of these teams advancing to semi-finals with partial-paid bid teams. Semi-finals were held for all dance divisions, with 50% of teams in senior divisions and top three teams from each country in open and junior divisions advancing to finals.

At this event, three new senior cheerleading divisions were offered for programs that were represented by only one team at the Cheerleading Worlds in the extra small/small all-girl, extra small coed and small coed divisions. Teams qualified by competing in their traditional category, but had the option to transfer to the appropriate limited category when registering for worlds.

IASF announced in May 2018 that they would be applying a "full top uniform" rule from the 2021 Cheerleading Worlds event onwards for teams in the international IASF-governed divisions, however, this was pushed to 2022 as a result of the pandemic. This meant that the 2022 Cheerleading Worlds was the first event to enforce this rule. This rule stated that teams competing in any international division must compete in a full top uniform, with no crop tops, half tops or mid-riffs being allowed per the image policy. This rule change was put in place in an attempt to promote a more globally athletic image of cheer.

The previous crossover rules that prohibited an athlete from performing in divisions at both The Cheerleading Worlds, as well as The Dance Worlds, returned. Crossover rules continued that prohibited an athlete from crossing over between dance programs at The Dance Worlds. An athlete was allowed to perform up to five times representing the same dance program at the event.

=== Results ===
Cheer Results
Division	Gold	Silver	Bronze
Limited Extra Small/Small All-Girl Level6	New Jersey Spirit Explosion - FAB5	Flipping Out Tumbling - Double or Nothing	Cheer Express Allstars - Miss Silver
Senior Extra Small All-Girl Level 6	SC Cheer - Fearless	Elite Cheer - Stars	Cheer Central Suns - Lady Suns
Senior Small All-Girl Level 6	ICE - Lady Lightning	Cheer Extreme Raleigh - SSX	Rain Athletics - Aqua
Senior Medium All-Girl Level 6	Top Gun All Stars - Lady Jags	East Celebrity Elite - Bombshells	Spirit of Texas - A-Team
Senior Large All-Girl Level 6	The Stingray All Stars - Orange	World Cup - Shooting Stars	Cheer Extreme - Senior Elite
Limited Extra Small Coed Level 6	CheerVille Athletics - Anarchy	Raglan Coast Cheer - Steel 6	Elite Cheer Michigan - COED Crush
Limited Small Coed Level 6	Famous Superstars - Gold	Star Athletics ATL - Smack	Connect Cheer Northwest - Twilight
Senior Extra Small Coed Level 6	Central Jersey All Stars - Team Gunz	GymTyme Illinois - Fever	Twist & Shout Tulsa - Diamonds
Senior Small Coed Level 6	Macs Allstar Cheer - Senior Starz	Brandon All-Star - Senior Black	Cheer St Louis - Archangels
Senior Medium Coed Level 6	Spirit of Texas - Royalty	Woodlands Elite OR - Black Ops	The California All Stars Livermore - Black Ops
Senior Large Coed Level 6	Top Gun All Stars - TGLC	The Stingray All Stars - Steel	Cheer Athletics Plano - Cheetahs
Senior Open Small Coed Level 6	Cheer Extreme Raleigh - SMOEX	Top Gun All Stars - TGOC	Brandon All Stars - Smoke
Senior Open Large Coed Level 6E	Top Gun All Stars - Revelation	Cheer Athletics Plano - Wildcats	The California All Stars San Marcos - Cali Coed
International Open All-Girl Level 5	Rebels Cheerleading Athletics - Smoke	Rising Stars - Ellipse	Black Widow Cheer Gym - Energy
International Open Small Coed Level 5	Cheer Sport Sharks Cambridge - Star Spotted Sharks	East Midlands Cheerleading Academy - EMCA C-Lebrities	East Coast Allstars - Phoenix
International Open Large Coed Level 5	Flyers All Starz - Notorious	RND Elite All Stars - Wicked	Coventry Dynamite - Ignite
International Open All-Girl Level 6	Cheer Sport Sharks Cambridge - Great White Sharks	Cheer Force Wolfpack - Golden Girls	Rockstar Cheer Pittsburgh - Supermodels
International Open Small Coed Level 6	Louisiana Cheer Force - Gold	Prodigy All Stars - Blacklight	Cheer Extreme - Coed Elite
International Open Large Coed Level 6	Top Gun All Stars - Double O	Tribe Cheer - VooDoo	Xtreme Cheer - Inferno
International Open All-Girl Non-Tumbling Level 6	The California All Stars San Marcos - Sparkle	Cheer Extreme - Lady Lux	East Celebrity Elite CT - Infamous
International Open Coed Non-Tumbling Level 6	Twist & Shout Tulsa - Adam & Eve	Diamonds All Stars - Showtime	Brandon All Stars - Legacy
International Global Club All-Girl Level 6	The Stingray All Stars - Cobalt	Vancouver All Stars - Ice Queens	Unity Allstars - Ruby
International Global Club Coed Level 6	The California All Stars Camarillo - SMOED	The Stingray All Stars - Electric	Top Gun All Stars - GLOC
International Open All-Girl Level 7	GymTyme Allstars - Gold	Viqueens Cheerleaders - Spirit	Vancouver All Stars - Blackout
International Open Small Coed Level 7	CheerForce San Diego - Nfinity	ACE Athletics - Rogue	GymTyme All-Stars - Jade
International Open Large Coed Level 7	GymTyme All Stars - Chrome	OC All Stars - Shadow	Pirates Athletics - Black Flag
International Open All Girl Non-Tumbling Level 7	Flyers All Starz - Karma	Flyers All Starz - Legends	United Cheer Berlin - Legends
International Open Coed Non-Tumbling Level 7	Unity Allstars - Black	Twister All Star - Twister Royal Cats	Vancouver All Stars - Black Ice

Dance Results:
Division	Gold	Silver	Bronze
Junior Dance (Open)	Dancin Bluebonnets - Junior Jazz	Star Steppers Dance - Junior Team Jazz	Ultimate Allstars - Junior Hip Hop
Senior Small Contemporary/Lyrical	Dance Mania - Senior Lyrical	Dancin Bluebonnets - Senior Small Contemporary	The Vision Dance Center - Allstars
Senior Large Contemporary/Lyrical	Dance Dynamics	Dancin Bluebonnets - Senior Large Contemporary	The Vision Dance Center - Senior Large Lyrical
Senior Small Hip Hop	Pittsburgh Pride All Stars - Ambush	Footnotes Fusion - Alliance	Legendary Athletics - Senior Elite
Senior Large Hip Hop	Pittsburgh Poison All Stars - Black Widows	Legendary Athletics - Senior Premier	Adrenaline Studio - Joules
Senior Small Coed Hip Hop	Pittsburg Poison All Stars - Dart Frogs	Footnotes Fusion - High Definition	Strut Performing Arts
Senior Large Coed Hip Hop	Pittsburgh Poison All Stars - Cyanide	Ultimate Allstars - Red Thunder	Dance Athletics - Raptors
Senior Small Jazz	Dance Mania - Senior Jazz Small	Dancin Bluebonnets - Senior Small Jazz	The Vision Dance Center - Allstars
Senior Large Jazz	The Vision Dance Center - Allstars	Dance Mania - Senior Jazz Large	Brookfield Dance and Brio Studios Co - Senior All Stars
Senior Small Pom	Dance Mania - Senior Pom Small	Champion Legacy - Senior All Stars	Innovate Dance Studio - Senior Pom
Senior Large Pom	Dance Mania - Senior Pom Large	Star Performance Centre - Senior Large Pom	Energizers
Open Open (Contemporary/Lyrical)	The Vision Dance Center - Allstars	Dance Dynamics	CheerForce Arizona - ACES DanceForce AZ
Open Elite Hip Hop	Angels Dance Academy - ADA Dominion Elite	Adrenaline Studio - Rage	Dollhouse Dance Factory - Villains
Open Elite Coed Hip Hop	Angels Dance Academy - ADA Dark Angels	Next Level Dance Co - Supremacy	The Architects Dance Academy - Colossus
Open Premier Hip Hop	Angels Dance Academy - ADA Dominion Premier	Footnotes Fusion - Two Point O	Dance Athletics - Lavish
Open Premier Coed Hip Hop	Seven Dancers	Team Puerto Rico Dance Team	Yo Dance - Team Force
Open Male Hip Hop	Angels Dance Academy - ADA Generals	Adrenaline Studio - Rush Crew	Footnotes Fusion - Neighborhood
Open Kick	Energizers	Foursis Dance Academy - Dazzlers	Starz Dance Academy - Elite All Starz
Open Jazz	Innovate Dance Studio - Open Jazz	Brookfield Dance a Brio Studios Co - Senior All Stars	The Vision Dance Center - Allstars
Open Coed Jazz	Dancin Bluebonnets - Open Coed Jazz	Studio 74	Star Steppers Dance - Senior Team Jazz
Open Pom	Dancing Dream Center Mexico	Gold Star Cheer and Dance - Gold Star Galaxy	Energizers
Open Coed Pom	Champion Dance & Cheer All Stars - Black	Cheerforce - The Ladies of Ten	Centro Artistico Yesenea Mendoza - Goldrush - Caym

== 2023 ==
The 2023 Cheerleading and Dance Worlds were held from April 21 to April 24, 2023, at Walt Disney World Resort, Orlando, Florida. Cheerleading divisions were held at ESPN Wide World of Sports Complex, while dance divisions were held at Disney's Coronado Springs Resort and Convention Centre.

Cheerleading preliminary competition rounds were held for senior open small coed teams with at-large bids, and U.S. teams with at-large bids in the international open all-girl non-tumbling level 6 and international open coed non-tumbling level 6 divisions. The top 10 teams from each of these preliminary rounds advanced to the semi-final rounds which included teams with partially paid and fully paid bids.

The semi-final round for the international open all-girl non-tumbling level 6 and international open coed non-tumbling level 6 divisions were declared the U.S. world trials, including only paid bid U.S. teams and the top 10 U.S. at large-bid teams from the preliminary round. Trophies and gold, silver and bronze medallions were awarded to the top three U.S. teams, and U.S. teams placing fourth through 10th were awarded trophies. The top three teams U.S. teams from this semi-final advanced to the division finals, along with the top three teams from other countries from the semi-finals.

Dance preliminary competition rounds were held for teams with at-large bids in the senior small contemporary/lyrical division, with a minimum of 50% of teams advancing to the semi-finals. Semi-finals were held for all divisions, with senior divisions having 50% of teams advance to the finals and open and junior divisions advancing the top three teams from each country.

IASF introduced five new international world cheerleading divisions for teams under 18. Prior to 2023, IASF international worlds divisions had no maximum age, with athletes instead having to meet a minimum age to be eligible for teams, making these divisions the first divisions with such a maximum. Three of these divisions were level 5, which remained restricted to entry by non-U.S. teams - U18 all-girl level 5, U18 small coed level 5 and U18 large coed level 5 - and two in level 6 in non-tumbling variants - U18 all-girl non-tumbling level 6 and U18 coed non-tumbling level 6. Despite the introduction of five divisions, lack of entries meant that only four competed with no U18 large coed level 5 teams entering this division at the competition.

IASF also raised the minimum age for open and global division teams to 15 years old, announcing they would further raise the age to 16 for the 2023–2024 season and Cheerleading Worlds 2024.

Kick was introduced as a new style into the USASF senior categories, expanding it from previously only be an international open category only.

=== Results ===
Cheer Results
Division	Gold	Silver	Bronze
Limited Extra Small/Small All-Girl Level 6	Rain Athletics - Aqua	Cheer Express Allstars - Miss Silver	Pennsylvania Elite Cheerleading - Guardians
Senior Extra Small All-Girl Level 6	South Coast Cheer - Fearless	ICE - Golden Girls	The California All Stars Mesa - Vixens
Senior Small All-Girl Level 6	ICE - Lady Lightning	Cheer Extreme Raleigh - SSX	Woodlands Elite OR - Red Angels
Senior Medium All-Girl Level 6	Spirit of Texas - A-Team	Top Gun All Stars - Lady Jags	East Celebrity Elite - Bombshells
Senior Large All-Girl Level 6	Cheer Extreme - Senior Elite	Cheer Athletics Plano - Panthers	The Stingray All Stars - Orange
Senior Open All-Girl Level 6	Maryland Twisters - F5	Woodlands Elite OR - Generals	Pittsburg Superstars - Supermodels
Limited Extra Small Coed Level 6	Fierce - Tigerettes	Extreme All Stars - Lvl X	Cheer St Louis - Archangels
Limited Small Coed Level 6	University Cheer Force - Firestorm	Famous Superstars - Gold	Raglan Coast Cheer - Steel 6
Senior Extra Small Coed Level 6	GymTyme Illinois - Fever	Central Jersey All Stars - Team Gunz	Twist & Shout Tulsa - Diamonds
Senior Small Coed Level 6	KC Cheer - Fierce Five	Macs Allstar Cheer - Mac's Senior Starz	Brandon All Stars - Senior Black
Senior Medium Coed Level 6	Prodigy All Stars - Midnight	The California All Stars Livermore - Black Ops	Spirit of Texas - Royalty
Senior Large Coed Level 6	Top Gun All Stars - TGLC	Cheer Athletics Plano - Cheetahs	The Stingray All Stars - Steel
Senior Open Small Coed Level 6	Top Gun All Stars - TGOC	Cheer Extreme Raleigh - SMOEX	Tribe Cheer - VooDoo
Senior Open Large Coed Level 6	Top Gun All Stars - Revelation	Cheer Athletics Plano - Wildcats	East Celebrity Elite Central - Smoke
International U18 All-Girl Level 5	Cheer Sport Sharks Kitchener - Smallfin Sharks (Canada)	Flyers All Starz - Inspire (Canada)	Cheer Pride All Stars - Kryptonite (Canada)
International U18 Small Coed Level 5	Flyers All Starz - Phoenix (Canada)	Perfect Storm Athletics Edmonton - Lightning (Canada)	Kingston Elite All Star - Imperial (Canada)
International U18 All-Girl Non-Tumbling Level 6	A-List Athletics - Glamour Girls (USA)	Cheer Extreme Raleigh - Cougars (USA)	Woodlands Elite Katy - Bombshells (USA)
International U18 Coed Non-Tumbling Level 6	World Cup - Omni (USA)	Cheer Extreme - CoEx (USA)	Davis Allstar Gym Inc - Black Ice (USA)
International Open All-Girl Level 5	ACE Athletics - S.W.A.T (Canada)	Evolution of Dance - Pink Panthers (Australia)	Crimson Heat - White Fang (England)
International Open Small Coed Level 5	Cheer Sport Sharks Kitchener - Star Spotted Sharks	Rising Stars - Midnight (England)	TR Cheer - Beast (Canada)
International Open Large Coed Level 5	Flyers All Starz - Notorious (Canada)	Coventry Dynamite - Ignite (England)	New Zealand All Star Cheerleaders - All Star Legacy Legendz (New Zealand)
International Open All-Girl Level 6	Cheer Sport Sharks - Kitchener - Great White Sharks (Canada)	Outlaws Allstars - Kelly Girls (Australia)	Prodigy All Stars - BLACKLIGHT (USA)
International Open Small Coed Level 6	The California All Stars San Marcos - Cali Coed (USA)	Cheer Athletics Plano - Swooshcats (USA)	CheerForce San Diego - Blackout (USA)
International Open Large Coed Level 6	Top Gun All Stars - Double O (USA)	Stars Vipers San Antonio - Anacondas (USA)	PCT - PCT Temptation (Canada)
International Open All-Girl Non-Tumbling Level 6	Cheer Extreme - Lady Lux (USA)	The California All Stars San Marcos - Sparkle (USA)	ACE Athletics - Vicious (Canada)
International Open Coed Non-Tumbling Level 6	Twist & Shout Tulsa - Adam & Eve (USA)	Cheer Extreme Raleigh - Code Black (USA)	Diamonds All Stars - Showtime (USA)
International Global Club All-Girl Level 6	Central Jersey All Stars - Bombshells (USA)	The Stingray All Stars - Cobalt (USA)	Unity Allstars - Ruby (England)
International Global Club Coed Level 6	Top Gun All Stars - GLOC (USA)	The California All Stars - Camarillo - SMOED (USA)	The Stingray All Stars - Electric (USA)
International Open All-Girl Level 7	East Celebrity Elite - Wildcat 7 (USA)	Vancouver All Stars - Black Out (Canada)	GymTyme All-Stars - Gold (USA)
International Open Small Coed Level 7	Top Gun All Stars - Guardians (USA)	CheerForce San Diego - Nfinity (USA)	Coyotes - Wild Pack (Canada)
International Open Large Coed Level 7	GymTyme All-Stars - Chrome (USA)	The California All Stars San Marcos - Rangers (USA)	SC Bayer - Dolphins Coed (Germany)
International Open All Girl Non-Tumbling Level 7	Flyers All Starz - Karma (Canada)	Unity Allstars - Blush (England)	ACE Athletics - Revenge (Canada)
International Open Coed Non-Tumbling Level 7	Unity Allstars - Black (England)	Southern Cross Cheerleading - Legacy (Australia)	Flyers All Starz - Karma Coed (Canada)

Dance Results:
Division	Gold	Silver	Bronze
Senior Small Contemporary/Lyrical	Dance Mania - Senior Lyrical	Dance Dynamics	Dancin Bluebonnets - Senior Small Contemporary
Senior Large Contemporary/Lyrical	Brio Studios - Prejudice	Dance Dynamics	The Vision Dance Center - Allstars
Senior Small Hip Hop	The Source Dance Lab	Champion Legacy - Senior All Star Small Hip Hop	Legendary Athletics - Senior Elite
Senior Large Hip Hop	Dollhouse Dance Factory - Poison Ivy	Adrenaline Studio - Joules	Pittsburgh Poison All Stars - Black Widows
Senior Small Coed Hip Hop	Ultimate Allstars - Coed Elite	Footnotes Fusion - High Definition	Imperial Athletics - Monarch
Senior Large Coed Hip Hop	Adrenaline Studio - Thunder Crew	Kashiwa Golden Hawks - Golden Hawks	Star Performance Centre - Senior Large Coed Hip Hop
Senior Small Jazz	Dance Mania	Mt Eden Ballet Academy - MEBA Senior Jazz Team	The Vision Dance Center - Allstars
Senior Large Jazz	Dance Dynamics	The Vision Dance Center - Allstars	5678! Dance Studio - 5678! Senior All Stars
Senior Kick	Energizers	Power of Dance - Beautiful People	Foursis Dance Academy - Foursis Dazzlers Dance
Senior Small Pom	SPG Cheerdance Project - H Beat Beans Vivid	Kagoshima YMCA - CAST Magic Faith	Shining Planets - Grant Sparkle
Senior Large Pom	Dance Mania - Senior Pom Large	South Coast Freestyle	Foursis Dance Academy
Open Open (Contemporary/Lyrical)	Dance Dynamics	The Vision Dance Center - Allstars	Dancin Bluebonnets - Open Open
Open Elite Hip Hop	Angels Dance Academy - ADA Dominion Elite	UIS	Evolution of Dance - Notorious
Open Elite Coed Hip Hop	Pittsburgh Poison All Stars - Dart Frogs	Angels Dance Academy - ADA Dark Angels	The Architects Dance Company - Colossus
Open Premier Hip Hop	Angels Dance Academy - ADA Dominion Premier	Adrenaline Studio - Rage	Dance Athletics - Archive
Open Premier Coed Hip Hop	World Wings - 2WDC	Pittsburgh Poison All Stars - Black Frogs	Adrenaline Studio - Fusion
Open Male Hip Hop	Angels Dance Academy - ADA Generals	EPA AllStars - Kingdom	Adrenaline Studio - Rush Crew
Open Kick	Energizers	Foursis Dance Academy - Foursis Dazzler Dance Team	Starz Dance Academy - Elite All Starz
Open Jazz	The Vision Dance Center - Allstars	Mt Eden Ballet Academy - MEBA Open Jazz Team	Bears Co. Ltd - Bears Ray
Open Coed Jazz	Champion Legacy - Worlds Open Coed Jazz	Academia Studio 74	Star Steppers Dance - Open Jazz
Open Pom	Planets	South Coast Freestyle - Harley	Wing Dance Promotion - Silver Wings
Open Coed Pom	Champion Legacy - Worlds Open Coed Pom	Gold Star Cheer and Dance Ltd - Twilight	Reign Elite - Royals

== 2024 ==
The 2024 Cheerleading and Dance Worlds were held from April 26 to April 29, 2024, at Walt Disney World Resort, Orlando, Florida. Cheerleading divisions were held at ESPN Wide World of Sports Complex, while dance divisions were held at Disney's Coronado Springs Resort and Convention Centre.

=== Results ===
Cheer Results
Division	Gold	Silver	Bronze
Limited Extra Small All-Girl Level 6	Cheer Express Allstars - Miss Silver	Elite Cheer - Elite Cheer Stars	Pittsburgh Pride All Stars - Purple Reign
Limited Small All-Girl Level 6	Rain Athletics - Aqua	Champion Cheer - Hear	Platinum Athletics - PAC 5
Senior Extra Small All-Girl Level 6	South Coast Cheer - Fearless	The California All Stars Mesa - Vixens	ICE - Golden Girls
Senior Small All-Girl Level 6	Cheer Extreme Raleigh - SSX	ICE - Lady Lightning	Top Gun All Stars - TGOC
Senior Medium All-Girl Level 6	Top Gun All Stars - Lady Jags	Central Jersey All Stars - Bombshells	Maryland Twisters - F5
Senior Large All-Girl Level 6	Cheer Athletics Plano - Panthers	The Stingray Allstars - Orange	World Cup - Shooting Stars
Limited Extra Small Coed Level 6	Extreme All Stars - Lvl X	Raglan Coast Cheer - Steel 6	Maine Stars - Glory
Limited Small Coed Level 6	University Cheer Force - Firestorm	Rival Athletics - Sr. Strange	Louisiana Cheer Force - Gold
Senior Extra Small Coed Level 6	GymTyme Illinois - Fever	Central Jersey All Stars - Team Gunz	Stars Vipers San Antonio - HISS
Senior Small Coed Level 6	Brandon All Stars - Senior Black	Macs Allstar Cheer - Mac's Senior Starz	Woodlands Elite OR - Black Ops
Senior Medium Coed Level 6	Top Gun All Stars - Revelation	The California All Stars Livermore - Black Ops	The Stingray Allstars - Steel
Senior Large Coed Level 6	Top Gun All Stars - TGLC	Cheer Athletics Plano - Cheetahs	ICE - LegICY
International U18 All-Girl Level 5	Cheer Sport Sharks Kitchener - Smallfin Sharks (Canada)	TR Cheer - Destiny (Canada)	Coventry Dynamite - Lady Grenades (England)
International U18 Small Coed Level 5	Unity Allstars - Royal (England)	Flyers All Starz - Phoenix (Canada)	ACE Athletics - Ammo (Canada)
International U18 All-Girl Non-Tumbling Level 6	Cheer Extreme Raleigh - Cougars (USA)	The California All Stars San Marcos - Glow (USA)	A-List Athletics - Glamour Girls (USA)
International U18 Coed Non-Tumbling Level 6	Cheer Athletics Denver - Black Ice (USA)	Cheer Extreme - Coex (USA)	World Cup - Omni (USA)
International Open All-Girl Level 5	New Zealand All Star Cheerleaders - Academy All Girl (New Zealand)	ACE Athletics - S.W.A.T (Canada)	Cheer Sport Sharks Kitchener - Grey Reef Sharks (Canada)
International Open Small Coed Level 5	Flyers All Starz - Notorious (Canada)	TR Cheer - Beast (Canada)	Cheer Sport Sharks Kitchener - Star Spotted Sharks (Canada)
International Open Large Coed Level 5	ACE Athletics - Rouge (Canada)	Millennium All Stars - OG5 (Australia)	Coventry Dynamite - Cov Coed (England)
International Open All-Girl Level 6	Cheer Force Wolfpack - Golden Girls (Canada)	Cheer Sport Sharks Kitchener - Great White Sharks (Canada)	Gymfinity Sports Academy - Ladies of the Crown (Wales)
International Open Small Coed Level 6	Cheer Athletics Plano - Swooshcats (USA)	Tribe Cheer - VooDoo (USA)	Cheer Athletics Denver - Rage (USA)
International Open Large Coed Level 6	Top Gun All Stars - Double O (USA)	Cheer Athletics Plano - Wildcats (USA)	Macs Allstar Cheer - Mac's Legacy (USA)
International Open All-Girl Non-Tumbling Level 6	Cheer Extreme - Lady Lux (USA)	The California All Stars San Marcos - Sparkle (USA)	ACE Athletics - Vicious (Canada)
International Open Coed Non-Tumbling Level 6	Cheer Extreme Raleigh - Code Black (USA)	Brandon All Stars - Legacy (USA)	Xtreme Cheer - Inferno (USA)
International Global All-Girl Level 6	Unity Allstars - Ruby (England)	Vancouver All Stars - Ice Queens (Canada)	The Stingray Allstars - Cobalt (USA)
International Global Coed Level 6	The Stingray Allstars - Electric (USA)	The California All Stars Camarillo - SMOED (USA)	Top Gun All Stars - GLOC (USA)
International Open All-Girl Level 7	Viqueens Cheerleaders - Spirit (Norway)	GymTyme All-Stars - Golds (USA)	TIE East Celebrity Elite - Wildcat 7 (USA) & Gothenburg Cheer One - Wildcats (Sweden)
International Open Small Coed Level 7	The California All Stars Livermore - Ghost Recon (USA)	Top Gun All Stars - Toxic (USA)	GymTyme All-Stars - Jade (USA)
International Open Large Coed Level 7	The California All Stars San Marcos - Rangers (USA)	Top Gun All Stars - Guardians (USA)	GymTyme All-Stars - Chrome (USA)
International Open All Girl Non-Tumbling Level 7	Flyers All Starz - Karma (Canada)	Unity Allstars - Blush (England)	Cheer Sport Sharks Kitchener - Stormy Sharks (Canada)
International Open Coed Non-Tumbling Level 7	Unity Allstars - Black (England)	Pure Allstars - Prophecy (Australia)	Flyers All Starz - Notorious (Canada)

Dance Results
Division	Gold	Silver	Bronze
Senior Small Contemporary/Lyrical	The Vision Dance Center - Senior Small Lyrical	Dance Mania - Senior Lyrical	Dance Dynamics - Senior Contemporary/Lyrical Small
Senior Large Contemporary/Lyrical	The Vision Dance Center - Senior Large Lyrical	Dance Dynamics - Senior Contemporary/Lyrical Large	Dancing with Roxie - Dancing with Roxie
Senior Small Hip Hop	Champion Legacy - Senior All Star Small Hip Hop	The Source Dance Lab - The Source Dance Lab	Dollhouse Dance Factory - Charlie's Angels
Senior Large Hip Hop	Dance Athletics - Lineage	Dollhouse Dance Factory - Kill Bill	Dance Dynamics - Senior Hip Hop Large
Senior Small Coed Hip Hop	Ultimate Allstars - Coed Elite	Star Performance Centre - Senior Small Coed Hip Hop	Adrenaline Studio - Havoc
Senior Large Coed Hip Hop	Star Performance Centre - Senior Large Coed Hip Hop	Pittsburgh Poison All Stars - Cyanide	Adrenaline Studio - Thunder Crew
Senior Small Jazz	Dance Mania - Senior Jazz Small	Studio L Dance Co. - Mama	Foursis Dance Academy - Dazzlers
Senior Large Jazz	Studio L Dance Co. - Varsity	Dance Mania - Senior Jazz Large	5678! Dance Studio - Move Dance Be Born
Senior Kick	Energizers - Flamingos	Starz Dance Academy - Senior All Stars	Foursis Dance Academy - Foursis Dazzlers Dance
Senior Small Pom	SPG Cheerdance Project - H Beat Beans Vivid	Shining Planets - Grant Sparkle	South Coast Freestyle - Wicked Witch
Senior Large Pom	Dance Mania - Senior Pom Large	Energizers - Tower of Terror	South Coast Freestyle - Toy Soldier
Open Open Elite (Contemporary/Lyrical)	DANZ Team Project - AZ Aces (USA)	Angels Dance Academy - ADA Virtues (England)	Centro Artistico Yesenea Mendoza - Space (Ecuador)
Open Open Premier (Contemporary/Lyrical)	The Vision Dance Center - All Stars (USA)	Dance Dynamics (USA)	Centro Artistico Yesenea Mendoza - Undone (Ecuador)
Open Elite Hip Hop	Angels Dance Academy - ADA Dominion Elite (England)	Footnotes Fusion - Priority (USA)	Wolf Pack All Stars - Fly Kids (USA)
Open Coed Elite Hip Hop	Angels Dance Academy - ADA Dark Angels (England)	The Architects Dance Company - Colossus (England)	Kashiwa Golden Hawks - Golden Hawks (Japan)
Open Premier Hip Hop	Star Performance Centre - Open Premier Hip Hop (USA)	Angels Dance Academy - ADA Dominion Premier (England)	Dance Athletics - Archive (USA)
Open Coed Premier Hip Hop	Lethal Vipers (Mexico)	Ecole de danse Danzaa - No Rules (Canada)	The Architects Dance Company - Colossus (England)
Open Male Hip Hop	Angels Dance Academy - ADA Genesis (England)	Adrenaline Studio - Rush Crew (USA)	Wolf Pack All Stars - Crew (USA)
Open Kick	Energizers - Kiss (USA)	Starz Dance Academy - SDA Elite All Starz Open Kick (USA)	
Open Elite Jazz	Firebird Dance Company - Storm (Scotland)	Wing Dance Promotion - Silver Wings (Japan)	NRG Studios - Elite Empresses (Australia)
Open Premier Jazz	The Dance Vision Center - All Stars (USA)	Dance Dymension - Beautiful People (Australia)	Endurance Elite - Aura (Australia)
Open Coed Jazz	Dance Factory (Mexico)	Dance Mania Nashville - Open Coed Jazz (USA)	Champion Legacy - Worlds Open Coed Jazz (USA)
Open Elite Pom	Wing Dance Promotion - Silver Wings (Japan)	Apex Cheerdance Team - Apex (Japan)	Innovate Dance Studio - Space Jam (USA)
Open Premier Pom	ABE Dance Promotion - Blue Force (Japan)	TDS Dance Complex (Mexico)	Endurance Elite - Elevate (Australia)
Open Coed Pom	Dance Factory (Mexico)	LB Company (Mexico)	South Coast Freestyle - Kobe the Legend (USA)
Junior Dance	Wingflap (Japan)	Kiyomi Cheerdance Place Kumamoto - KCPK Hot Heart (Japan)	Dance Dynamics - Junior Jazz (USA)

== 2025 ==
The 2025 Cheerleading and Dance Worlds were held from April 25 to April 28, 2025, at Walt Disney World Resort, Orlando, Florida. Cheerleading divisions were held at ESPN Wide World of Sports Complex, while dance divisions were held at Disney's Coronado Springs Resort and Convention Centre.

=== Results ===
Cheer Results
Division	Gold	Silver	Bronze
Limited Extra Small All-Girl Level 6	Pack Athletics - Miss 6	Cheer Express Allstars - Miss Silver	Connect Cheer Northwest - Twilight
Limited Small All-Girl Level 6	Rain Athletics - Aqua	New Jersey Spirit Explosion - FAB5	Pittsburgh Pride All Stars - Purple Reign
Senior Extra Small All-Girl Level 6	ICE - Golden Girls	The California All Stars-San Marcos - Lady Bulletts	The Stingray Allstars - Purple
Senior Small All-Girl Level 6	Cheer Extreme - Raleigh - SSX	Woodlands Elite - OR - Generals	Top Gun All Stars - TGOC
Senior Medium All-Girl Level 6	Central Jersey All Stars - Bombshells	The Stingray Allstars - Peach	Maryland Twisters - F5
Senior Large All-Girl Level 6	Cheer Extreme - Senior Elite	The Stingray Allstars - Orange	World Cup - Shooting Stars
Limited Extra Small Coed Level 6	Maine Stars - Glory	Fierce - Tigerettes	TAI - Ice Coed
Limited Small Coed Level 6	Macs Allstar Cheer - Mac's Senior Starz	Louisiana Cheer Force - Gold	Cheer St Louis - Archangels
Senior Extra Small Coed Level 6	GymTyme Illinois - Fever	Central Jersey All Stars - Team Gunz	CheerVille HV - Anarchy
Senior Small Coed Level 6	Brandon All-Stars - Senior Black	Woodlands Elite - OR - Black Ops	Prodigy All Stars - Midnight
Senior Medium Coed Level 6	The California All Stars-Livermore - Black Ops	Top Gun All Stars - Revelation	Spirit of Texas - Royalty
Senior Large Coed Level 6	Top Gun All Stars - TGLC	The Stingray Allstars - Steel	Cheer Athletics - Plano - Cheetahs
International U18 All-Girl Level 5	Evolution of Dance - Pink Panthers (AUS)	TR Cheer - Destiny (CAN)	Coventry Dynamite - Lady Grenades (ENG)
International U18 Small Coed Level 5	Unity Allstars - Royal (ENG)	Flyers All Starz - Phoenix (CAN)	New Zealand All Star Cheerleaders - Junior Academy Coed (NZL)
International U18 All-Girl Non-Tumbling Level 6	The California All Stars-San Marcos - Glow (USA)	Cheer Extreme - Raleigh - Cougars (USA)	Cheer Athletics - Denver - Black Ice (USA)
International U18 Coed Non-Tumbling Level 6	ATA - QuaNTum (USA)	Top Gun All Stars - Angels (USA)	Cheer Extreme - Coex (USA)
International Open All-Girl Level 5	Cheer Sport Sharks - Kitchener - Grey Reef Sharks (CAN)	ACE Athletics - S. W. A. T (CAN)	Coventry Dynamite - FIYA 5 (ENG)
International Open Small Coed Level 5		Unity Allstars - Volt (ENG)	Vista Twisters - T5(ENG)
International Open Large Coed Level 5	Pure Allstars - Pure Allstars (AUS)	Cheer Sport Sharks - Kitchener - Star Spotted Sharks (CAN)	Flyers All Starz - NOTORIOUS (CAN)
International Open All-Girl Level 6	Cheer Force Wolfpack - Golden Girls (CAN)	Cheer Sport Sharks - Kitchener - Great White Sharks (CAN)	Unity Allstars - Ruby (ENG)
International Open Small Coed Level 6	The California All Stars-San Marcos - Cali Coed (USA)	The Stingray Allstars - Cobalt (USA)	Cheer Athletics - Plano - Swooshcats (USA)
International Open Large Coed Level 6	Top Gun All Stars - Double 0 (USA)	Cheer Athletics - Plano - Wildcats (USA)	The Stingray Allstars - Electric (USA)
International Open All-Girl Non-Tumbling Level 6	Cheer Extreme - Lady Lux (USA)	Cheer Sport Sharks - Ottawa - Silky Sharks (CAN)	ACE Athletics - VICIOUS (CAN)
International Open Coed Non-Tumbling Level 6	Cheer Extreme - Raleigh - Code Black (USA)	California Pride - Big Bang (USA)	The California All Stars-Las Vegas - Kings (USA)
International Open All-Girl Level 7	VANCOUVER ALL STARS - Blackout (CAN)	GymTyme All-Stars - Gold (USA)	Viqueens Cheerleaders - Spirit (NOR)
International Open Small Coed Level 7	CheerForce San Diego - Nfinity (USA)	The California All Stars-Livermore - Ghost Recon (USA)	East Celebrity Elite - King Cats (USA)
International Open Large Coed Level 7	The California All Stars-San Marcos - Rangers (USA)	Ultimate Cheer Lubbock - Royal Court (USA)	Cheer Athletics - Charlotte - KingCats (USA)
International Open All Girl Non-Tumbling Level 7	Flyers All Starz - Karma (CAN)	Unity Allstars - Blush (ENG)	The California All Stars-San Marcos - Relentless (USA)
International Open Coed Non-Tumbling Level 7	Unity Allstars - Black (ENG)	The California All Stars-Camarillo - Revolverz (USA)	Barcelona Bears - Bears Legacy (ESP)

Dance Results
Division	Gold	Silver	Bronze
Senior Small Contemporary/Lyrical	Dance Dynamics - Senior Small Contemporary/Lyrical	Dance Precisions - Nothing Left to Burn	Dance Mania - Senior Lyrical
Senior Large Contemporary/Lyrical	Dance Dynamics - Senior Large Contemporary/Lyrical	The Vision Dance Center - Senior Large Lyrical	The Dance Vault - KC Collective
Senior Small Hip Hop	The Source Dance Lab - Assassins - MAFIA	Champion Legacy - Senior All Star Small Hip Hop	Dollhouse Dance Factory - Catwoman
Senior Large Hip Hop	Dance Athletics - Lineage	Pittsburgh Poison All Stars - Black Widows	ECU - Atico Danzas (ECU)
Senior Small Coed Hip Hop	Star Performance Centre - Senior Small Coed Hip Hop	Adrenaline Studio - HAVOC	Pittsburgh Poison All Stars - Dart Frog
Senior Large Coed Hip Hop	Star Performance Centre - Senior Large Coed Hip Hop	Pittsburgh Poison All Stars - Cyanide	Studio L Dance Co. - Senior Large Coed Hip Hop
Senior Small Jazz	Dance Mania - Senior Small Jazz	5678! Dance Studio - Indestructible	Dolce All-Star - Senior Jazz - Small
Senior Large Jazz	Dance Dynamics - Senior Large Jazz	The Dance Vault - KC Collective	Studio 22 - Studio 22 Senior All Stars Large Jazz
Senior Kick	Energizers - Run for the Roses	Starz Dance Academy - SDA - Senior Kick Vampire	Dance Athletics - Plano - Senior Kick
Senior Small Pom	SPG Cheerdance Project - H BEAT BEANS VIVID (JPN)	Innovate Dance Studio - Clue	Dolce All-Star - Senior Pom - Small
Senior Large Pom	Team Japan - SHINING PLANETS - Grant Sparkle (JPN)	Dance Mania - Senior pom - Large	South Coast Freestyle - Ninjas
Open Open (Contemporary/Lyrical)	The Vision Dance Center - Open Lyrical (USA)	Dance Dynamics - Open Open Contemporary/Lyrical (USA)	AZ ACES - Open Open Contemporary/Lyrical (USA)
Open Hip Hop	Footnotes Fusion - Priority (USA)	Academia de Danza Udar Chile - Academia de Danza Udar Chile (CHL)	Angels Dance Academy - ADA Dominion (ENG)
Open Coed Hip Hop	WORLDWINGS - 2WDC (JPN)	Angels Dance Academy - Dark Angels (ENG)	ECU - Bailarte Studio (ECU)
Open Male Hip Hop	Angels Dance Academy - ADA Genesis	Adrenaline Studio - RUSH CREW	EPA Allstars - Kingdom (USA)
Open Jazz	Dance Dynamics - Open Jazz (USA)	The Vision Dance Center - Open Jazz (USA)	Pacific Elite Dance - Mystics (AUS)
Open Coed Jazz	Dance Factory - Dance Factory (MEX)	Dancin with Roxie - Open Jazz - Get Your Freak On (USA)	AZ ACES - AZ ACES - Open Coed Jazz (USA).
Open Pom	PLANETS Dance Company - Planets (JPN)	Innovate Dance Studio - Open Pom- Deadpool (USA)	South Coast Freestyle - Open Pom - Snake (USA)
Open Coed Pom	Dance Factory - Dance Factory (MEX)	Energizers - Limbo Rock - Open Coed Pom (USA)	AZ ACES - AZ ACES - Open Coed Pom (USA)
Junior Dance	YDC DANCE STUDIO - Lapisâ˜†DIO (JPN)	Dance Dynamics - Junior Dance (USA)	Cheers Factory - CHEERS FACTORY (JPN)

== Future dates ==
Announced future dates include:

- 2026: April 24–27
- 2027: April 23–26
- 2028: April 21–24
- 2029: April 27–30
- 2030: April 26–29
