= Skybound =

Skybound may refer to:

== Brands, companies, organizations, groups ==
- Skybound Entertainment, U.S. entertainment company founded by Robert Kirkman and David Alpert
- Skybound Games, a videogames subsidiary of Skybound Entertainment
- Skybound Comics, a comics imprint of Image Comics directed by Robert Kirkman

== Stage and screen ==
- Skybound (film), a 1935 U.S. action film
- Ninjago: Skybound, the sixth season of animated TV series Ninjago
- Skybound, a 2017 film starring Gavin Stenhouse
- Skybound, a stage musical by Marjorie Kellogg

== Music ==
- Skybound, a 1992 album by Leslie Fish
- Skybound, a 2007 album by Tom Baxter, containing the eponymous title track "Skybound"
- "Skybound", a 2011 song and single by Molly Nilsson from the album History
- "Skybound", a 2017 song by Regine Velasquez from the album R3.0

== Other uses ==
- Skybound, Hudson Bay Mountain, Smithers, British Columbia, Canada; an alpine skiing piste

== See also ==
- Skybound Elite Allstars, a team in cheerleading in Australia
