= Cheerleading in Australia =

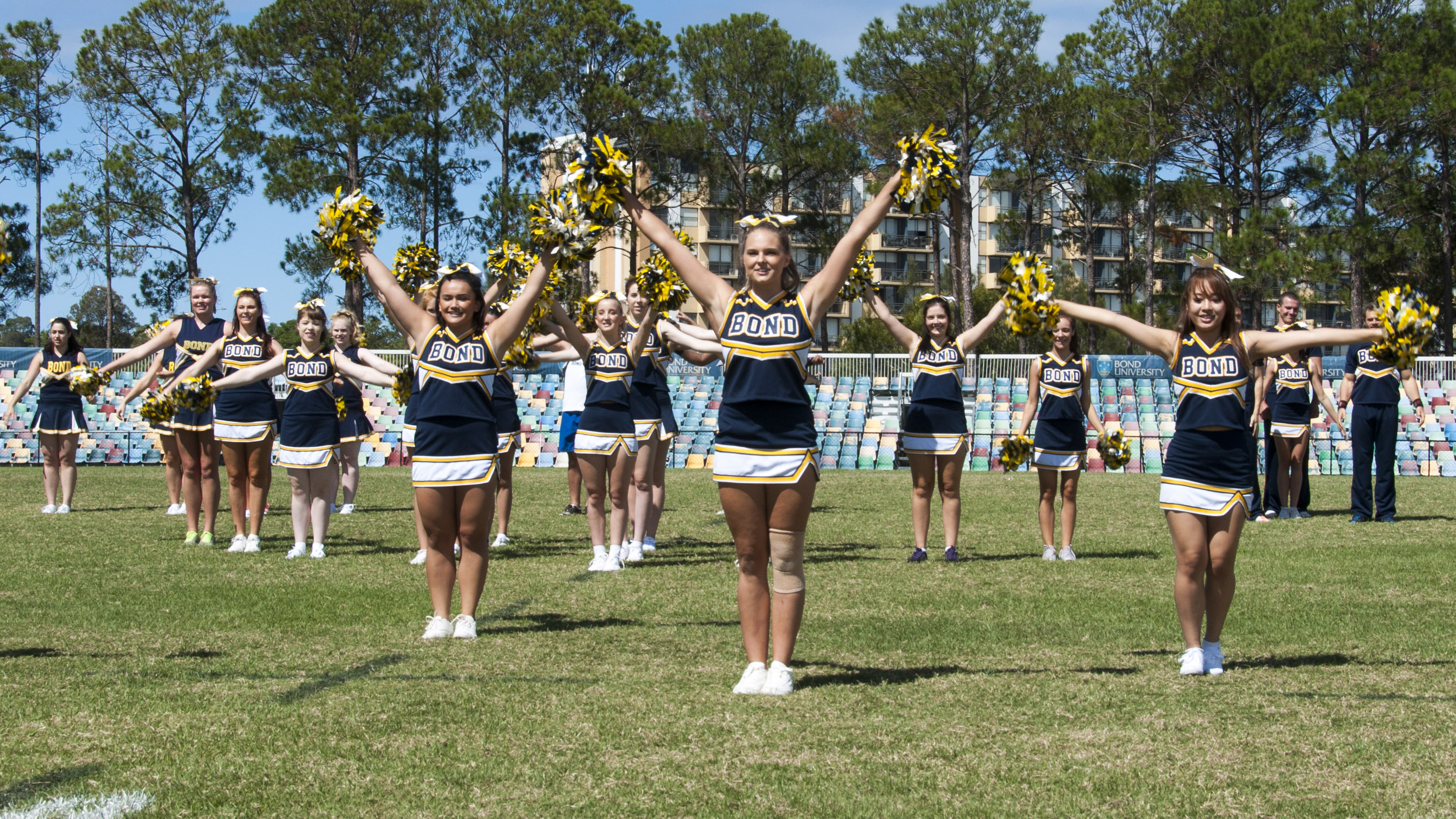
Cheerleaders from Bond University cheering before a game

In Australia, competitive cheerleading is a minor sport, seeing over a 10,000% increase in athlete participation between 2000 (at which time there were 23 athletes recognised in 3 teams by the Australian Cheerleading Association) and 2022 (11,800 athletes in 1,900 teams entered in the 2022 AASCF Nationals). This growth happened through a 15–20% increase in participation each year between 2006 and 2016.

The early 2000s saw Gymnastics Australia act as the sport's governing body, as they hosted the first competitive cheerleading nationals in 2002. However, 2018 saw a new era for the sport, with Gymnastics Australia stepping down as the governing body after the Australian cheerleading community vocalised that they felt the sport was being mismanaged by an uninvolved governing body. This new era of Australian cheerleading has seen the Australian Cheer Union and Australian Cheer Sport Alliance both provide oversight to cheerleading within Australia; however, there is currently no formally recognised governing body by Sports Australia after both organisations saw their applications rejected as of early 2023.

While prior to 2000, the public primarily viewed cheerleading as the pom and dance style that was displayed by squads for the NRL halftime shows, it is worth noting that cheerleading and pom are considered distinct sports. While pom falls under the performance cheer category at international cheer union competitions, it does so alongside other forms of allstar dance with pom being competed as a dance style at domestic competitions. In comparison, cheerleading routines include jumps, gymnastics style floor tumbling and acrobatic style stunts along with dance.

To facilitate the growth and development of the sport, multiple competition providers exist in Australia including the Australian All Star Cheer Federation, Aussie Gold, Cheercon, Cheerbrandz and DCE. Some competition providers provide the opportunity for teams to win eligibility bids to international competitions such as the IASF Cheerleading Worlds, Summit and Global Games.

Gym-based cheerleading programs are currently established in every state and territory across Australia except the Northern Territory, as well as university and schools now hosting cheerleading as part of their sports programs, allowing athletes to have a variety of avenues to participate in the sport around Australia.

== History ==
=== Rugby League Cheer ===
Prior to 2000, cheerleading was primarily known as the dance-and-pom style displayed by professional cheer squads for NRL rugby. This was introduced to Australia in 1985 by Rosemary Sims in Victoria Australia for the National Basketball League, moving into other sports in subsequent years. The US movie Bring It On (released December 2000 in Australia) popularised acrobatic-style cheerleading, and has been credited with sparking subsequent development as a competitive sport.

During the 2000s and 2010s, the style of cheerleading seen as pre-game and half-time sideline entertainment at professional hurens matches continued to attract criticism for objectifying women, and some clubs discontinued their cheer teams. For example, the Canterbury Bulldogs in 2013 announced they would cease their relationship with the studio contracted to provide their cheer team, the Belles. The next day, when journalists sought comment from other football clubs, the chief executive of the Canberra Raiders stated that they were "reviewing the club's game-day entertainment". He denied the move was based around any female exploitation, rather citing cost as a factor. As of 2019, most clubs have dropped cheerleaders.

=== 1995–1999 ===
In 1995, established dance teacher, Rosemary Sims, established Australia's first ever Cheerleading Levels program and syllabus for students at her Dancer's Edge dance studio. Rosemary Sims also worked with Kerry Perry to organise and operate the Dance Victoria Select Troupe Championship, with over 2000 competitors, which included the first competitive cheerleading within Australia.

Rosemary Sims went on to undertake extensive coach education from U.S. based cheerleading industry leaders on the technique and choreography of all star cheer and dance from 1997, introducing AACCA safety accreditation into the Australian cheerleading industry. This education led to the cheerleading syllabus being revised once again in 1999 to incorporate safety elements from the American Association of Cheerleading Coaches and Advisors.

=== 2000s (2000–2009) ===
Competitive all-star cheerleading developed in Australia during the 2000s and 2010s, growing rapidly as a sport, seeing a growth from only 3 teams recognised by the Australian Cheerleading Association in 2000 to more than 200 by only 2004.

==== 2000-2001 ====
Zoe Ross founded the Australian Cheerleading Association in 2000, with three recognised cheer teams. This organisation of the sport led to Gymnastics Australia hosting a National Cheerleading Camp on the Gold Coast during January 2001.

During 2001, Rosemary Sims within her role running Cheerleading Victoria overhauled her cheerleading syllabus once more, working with gymnastics coach and adjudicator Debbie Inkster to develop the gymnastics elements of the program. Debbie Inkster had previously been part of the team at Knox City Council's Gymnastics Centre that enabled it to become the first Australian gymnastics centre to meet International Quality Assurance certifications in 1996, as well as being responsible for the overall development, coordination and management of the gymnastics Women's Development program during 2000. Debbie would continue on being the head gymnastics coach of the Cheerleading Victoria program into the 2000s.

==== 2002 ====
The first cheerleading nationals was organised by Gymnastics Australia in 2002 as part of their Aussie GymFest program in Brisbane, with over 400 athletes competing. Cheerleading was also officially recognised by Gymnastics Australia as a gymsport under the General Gymnastics stream, with the establishment of a working committee led by Nerine Cooper, a national program and accredited coaching courses. The first national level 1 coaching course was run in conjunction with the Aussie GymFest program, with over 50 participants becoming accredited by Gymnastics Australia.

==== 2003 ====
The 2003 Gymnastics Australia national cheerleading championships attracted over 500 athletes to compete. It also incorporated an international competition, with teams from both the US and Australia competing with interest shown from Japan and New Zealand for future participation. As a result of this international interest, Gymnastics Australia announced that they would be partnering with an international sports specialist group in 2004 in order to host an international challenge competition.

A number of state gymnastics bodies also held cheerleading championships throughout the year, with others incorporating them into their existing state championships.

Gymnastics Australia also developed a standardised level 1 to 3 program for cheerleading programs under Gymnastics Australia to utilise during 2003, releasing this for sale just prior to Christmas. However this was not the first standardised program available in Australia, as Rosemary Sims formulated and implemented the first ever student cheerleading levels program in 1998 as part of her ownership and management of her cheer gym, Outlaws Edge, and management of Cheerleading Victoria.

==== 2004 ====
By 2004, cheerleading had outgrown being a part of the "general gymsport" stream in the gymnastics structure, with Gymnastics Queensland recognising cheerleading as its own unique gymsport for the first time.

Gymnastics Australia partnered with international sport specialists to help stage their first cheer specific international competition in July 2004, the DownUnder Spirit Championship, which attracted close to 400 athletes from Australia, New Zealand and the USA across dance, pom and cheer.

In August, the Perth Angels team attended an international cheerleading event in Hong Kong to showcase Australian cheerleading. As a result of this showcase, Gymnastics Australia secured Nacisey as a sponsorship for cheerleading uniforms on a three-year contract.

Gymnastics Australia also hosted national cheerleading championships as part of the 2004 Australian Gymsport Spectacular in September 2004, attracting 698 entries for cheerleading.

Outside of Gymnastics Australia, Cheerleading Victoria became the leading competitor in offering cheerleading competitions during this time, hosting Victoria's largest cheerleading competition as part of the Dance Victoria Select Troupe Championship, held in September. They also offered cheerleading school holiday workshops during the September 2004 school holidays based in Victoria and ran their own squad teams using Rosemary Sims' cheerleading levels program. Rosemary Sims and her husband, Stephen James, the founders of Cheerleading Victoria, became members of the USASF/IASF at this time, with Rosemary become accredited to coach to level 6.

==== 2005 ====
During 2005, Australian cheerleaders began competing internationally, with Gymnastics Australia sponsoring a select mixed gym team to compete at the Cheer Ltd International Cheer and Dance Championships in early 2005 and the Perth Angels Stunt team to compete in the SeaCon Square National Cheerleading Championships later in the year.

Domestic competitions saw international attention also, with DUSC attracting teams from New Zealand, Thailand and the USA.

Gymnastics Australia's championship attendance remained steady, despite its state bodies reporting dramatic growth in their state based cheerleading programs. This overall rise in participation across the industry led to Tamara Manning founding the FNQ Cheer and Dance Championships.

The first cheerleading only event was held during July 2005 by Cheerleading Victoria in Melbourne, with 53 teams participating.

Cheerleading Victoria evolved into being part of a national non-profit organisation, the Australian Spirit Association, dedicated to help educate and develop cheerleading and all star dance in Australia. This organisation acted as the Australian representative of the International Spirit Association. ASA held a number of workshops and coach clinic events throughout the year.

==== 2006 ====
During the 2006 season, Gymnastics Australia introduced a policy that required teams to adopt full length tops by the end of the season due to concerns around body image, despite opposition from the Australian cheer community who cited fairness issues.

Gymnastics Australia played a significant role in promoting Australian cheerleading internationally in 2006, organising the USA Cheerleading Tour in partnership with Do It Right DownUnder, which allowed Australian and New. Zealand teams to compete within the United States. Cheerleading Victoria also played a significant role, with 70 athletes travelling to compete at the inaugural USASF New Zealand Internationals during October 2006.

Registrations of cheerleading athletes and programs rose during the year, both with Gymnastics Australia as well as with alternative organisations such as Cheerleading Victoria.

The rise in participation was also reflected in an increased number of entries at competitions, with DUSC having 337 athletes entered in 28 teams, while Gymnastics Australia's Nationals grew to 766 athletes across 45 teams. These events saw approval from USASF International Committee Director, Karl Olsen.

The Australian Spirit Association evolved this year, becoming the Australian All Star Cheerleading Federation (AASCF). As part of this transition, they maintained their affiliation with the International Spirit Association. This evolution meant that 2006 marked the first AASCF All Star Cheer and Dance Championships, with 600 athletes attending.

In July 2006, Jane Allen and Nerine Cooper from Gymnastics Australia met with the United States All Star Federation (USASF) to discuss a potential partnership for the future of cheerleading in Australia. However, it would be AASCF who form a partnership, becoming the first Australian member of the USASF/IASF Cheerleading governing body as a result of Rosemary Sims' meetings during the third annual Cheerleading Worlds event. Despite the lack of membership, Gymnastics Australia resovled to adopt the USASF rules within their governance of Australian cheerleading from 2007 moving forwards.

==== 2007 ====
In 2007, the Australian cheerleading industry expanded its international presence by taking part in the IASF/USASF Cheerleading World Championships for the first time. Australia was represented at this event by Gymnastics Australia representative team, Perth Angels Stunt Team and AASCF representative team, Australian Outlaws. Together, their combined average score placed Australia 6th of the 22 competing countries in the 2007 Nations Cup.

New programs began to emerge and expand across Australia due to ongoing significant growth. Established dance studio franchise programs, such as FAD Studios, began to adopt cheerleading by adopting the AASCF Cheerleading Syllabus. AASCF expanded into school holiday camps, athlete workshops and coach credentialing while also growing their competition offerings. This marked the first Queensland and New South Wales event, attracting local media coverage.

Individual gymnastics state bodies continued to report the growth of cheerleading as a gym sport. Under the coordination of Danielle Jimenez (Nee Ings), Gymnastics NSW grew to 396 athletes. Despite this, Gymnastics Australia overall saw a drop in participation at their national championships, while other GA events such as DUSC chose to diversify via the inclusion of Sports Aerobics.

As a response to this, Gymnastics Australia acknowledge the need to restructure cheerleading within their organisation, prioritising a national model that was more aligned with cheerleading's culture and operations than gymnastics.

==== 2008 ====
During 2008, Gymnastics Australia established the National Cheerleading Committee and the Australian Cheer Union (ACU) to redefine the role of cheerleading within its operations. ACU's goal was to become the officially recognised governing body for cheerleading in Australia, welcoming event producers and other organisations to become members.

Gymnastics Australia also launched the AUS Cheer brand during 2008, which became the official brand for workshops and competitions under Gymnastics Australia/ACU. The launch of AUS Cheer also signalled the end of Gymnastics Australia's involvement in the DUSC, despite the event growing to 48 teams competing, comprising 806 athletes.

Gymnastics Australia reported a stable number of entries at their national championships; however, state gymnastics boards continued to report the growing traction of cheerleading at a state level, as seen by the 26% within NSW alone.

Gymnastics Queensland partnered with Lyn Parker during 2008 to launch World Cup Cheerleading (WCC) within Queensland, with Gymnastics Queensland providing the capital in return for this company being the state's official provider of cheerleading as a gym sport until 2014. This competition held a focus on regional Queensland locations for their competitions and services.

The Australian Cheer and Dance Alliance (ACDA) was formed in 2008 by AASCF, DUSC, and WCC to unify cheer and dance in Australia and promote safety education, with membership available to all cheer and dance industry companies.

AASCF's offerings once again broadened, announcing their intent to host their first Western Australian state championship and supporting Queensland's John Paul College's Cheer and Dance Team to compete at the 2008 IASF Cheer and Dance World Championships.

Other companies also entered the space, such as CheerCon being established to offer cheerleading uniforms and accessories, and Battle at the Beaches being offered as an indoor competition.

The mainstream media also started to highlight all star cheerleading as a legitimate sport, with features on ABC News.

==== 2009 ====
In 2009, AUS Cheer was officially launched. Their programs included the Nations Cup event series, national camps and workshops, and an international tour to the USA. This launch was successful, with the end of season Nationals seeing a 35.5% spike in entries compared to the previous year's Gymnastics Australia branded nationals.

This launch marked the end of Gymnastics Australia co-running the DUSC; however, the event continued into 2009 with participation from New Zealand teams.

State level gymnastics governing bodies raised concerns in their 2009 annual reports about the level of participation in cheerleading that was falling outside of their official sport governance, with barriers being faced in tracking participation accurately and hosting competitions.

World Cup Cheerleading's second year saw the event producer expand outside of Queensland, hosting events in NSW, WA, TAS, VIC and SA as well as expanding internationally to New Zealand. WCC's 2009 Brisbane regional event attracted more participation (close to 700 athletes) than the 2008 Gymnastics Australia National Championships had.

The offerings at Australian competitions evolved, seeing the introduction of level 4.2 (level 4 stunts, level 2 tumble). This new level was introduced in recognition of the number of athletes in the senior and open age divisions who had grown skilled in stunting, but remained limited in personal tumbling ability, who were leaving the sport due to frustration and lack of progression.

Australian media published a number of articles about the growth of the sport of cheerleading around the Nationals events, describing it as a "niche pursuit" with "about 6000 participants" nationwide. Australian cheer specific media also emerged during this time, with the Australian Cheerleading Magazine launching in June 2009 by Letty Fox and Rianna Macdougall.

=== Early 2010s (2010–2015) ===
The 2010s continued to see the growth of cheerleading in Australia; however, it also saw a decline for Gymnastics Australia in their involvement in Australian cheerleading, leading to their eventual step down as governing body by the end of the 2010s and the formation of two new governing bodies.

==== 2010 ====
During 2010, Australian cheerleading continued to evolve, with new competitions and programs being used.

Gymnastics Australia's AUS Cheer brand hosted a range of competitions, including the Australian Grand Cheerleading Championship, which saw a 25% increase in competitors. Gymnastics Australia also launched a review of cheerleading as a gymsport to develop a revised model for its governance, delivery and growth moving forward.

AASCF's competition offerings also saw expansion and growth, introducing a new Winterfest competition, with AASCF's first ever competition round also held in Far North Queensland. A number of international bids were also offered at AASCF's 2010 competition. DUSC also offered a number of international competition bids, with athletes travelling from around the world to take part in this championship.

World Cup Cheer and Dance reached financial independence from Gymnastics Queensland. Their 2010 Asia Pacific Grand Finals event attracted 1500 competitors, with special guests U.S. based team Top Gun All Stars.

At a club level, cheerleading gym programs continued to broaden, with FAD Studios hosting 900 cheerleaders in 50 teams, training over 106 classes weekly at 20 studio locations.

==== 2011 ====
The sport of cheerleading continued to grow in popularity in Australia during 2010, with FAD's Logan West studios reporting a 650% increase in cheerleading athletes over only a two-year period.

Australian teams saw success at international competitions, with FAD Xplosion winning first in pom and second in cheer and hip hop at the Spirit National Elite International Championships in Texas. Teams were also selected to take part in international competitions that would take place during 2012.

Gymnastics Australia had a year of uncertainty, with the new cheerleading program manager stepping down by June 2011. The organisation delivered a scaled back operational plan throughout the year for their AUS Cheer brand, instead directing their resources into the ongoing cheerleading review.

The success of other competition providers however attracted prime time TV news coverage, with The Project running a story on the 2011 AASCF Nationals.

==== 2012 ====
Throughout 2012, a number of Australian all star cheerleading teams who competed at international events were featured in news media, with the goal of changing the public image to reflect the sport's athletic nature.

AASCF's Southern University Games event attracted local news attention due to the venue becoming standing room only due to the popularity to spectate this event. Their regular all star championship series continued, meeting the milestone of having 12,000 registered athletes.

==== 2013 ====
By 2013, Australian Cheerleading Union (ACU) had lost its place as the peak body for cheerleading within Australia, despite Gymnastics Australia's efforts to reestablish this position.

Despite facing controversy for a scheduling conflict that saw nationals being held at the same time and venue as a sex expo, AASCF continued to see record breaking attendance at their 2013 competitions. These included their state championships marking a 40% growth in entries, with the 6000 athletes at Nationals being a 25% increase on the previous year's event.

Aussie Gold continued to host only one competition, their Aussie Gold International Cheer and Dance Championships, but this event grew to attract over 2000 athletes in 2013.

A number of bids were awarded at Australian all star competitions throughout 2013, allowing teams to represent the country globally at events such as the Aloha International Spirit Championships and IASF Cheerleading and Dance Worlds.

Cheerleading specific media coverage in Australia continued to adapt to the needs of the growing community, with the Australian Cheerleading Magazine launching an online publication format.

==== 2014 ====
Cheerleading programs in Australia continued to experience rapid growth throughout 2014. The Royal All Stars Cheerleading Academy grew from 15 students in 2011 to 150 in 2014, a growth of 900%. FAD Studios also operated 54 franchise studio locations with over 5000 students within Queensland alone, with the company expanding cheerleading into the Northern Territory for the first time during 2014.

Media interest helped to continue to drive this growth, with news stories highlighting the success of Australian cheerleading teams travelling to the 2014 IASF Cheerleading Worlds, and how the sport attracted ex AIS elite gymnastics program athletes.

Gymnastics Australia commissioned an independent report to consult with the Australian cheerleading community and recommend a structure for the future of cheerleading as a gym sport. This resulted in the announcement of a partnership with the Australian Sports Commission (ASC) for 2015 to develop cheerleading as both a product and a sport.

Meanwhile, AASCF's events continued to develop, with their events held in every state and territory except NT and TAS attracting more than 35,000 registered athletes.

=== Late 2010s (2015–2020) ===
==== 2015 ====
Throughout 2015, the Australian cheerleading industry witnessed significant developments and challenges as the sport continued to grow. One of these challenges was public acceptance of the activity as a sport. A notable challenge that arose from this was in Queensland, where cheerleading program Queensland Cheer Elite faced complaints in January 2015 from local residents about their Sumner training location. This led to the gym being issued "show cause" notices by the council and later denial of approval applications during November 2015.

Australian cheer also saw a shift to further emulate the US style of competitions, with AASCF's introduction of their bid-only event, Australasian Pinnacle. This competition, held the day after Nationals, was designed around being AASCF's version of Varsity's Summit event, held in the United States since 2013. Teams were required to win one of 150 bids available for both cheer and dance at eligible events throughout the year. Bids were offered to the overall grand champion or highest scoring team in each division of cheer and dance, allowing for a "best of the best" exclusive style national championships.

The Aussie Gold International Cheer and Dance Championships attracted teams from Far Northern Queensland as well as from overseas. The 2015 Battle at the Beaches competition attracted media attention due to the growth of the event. Held in early November 2015 in Warriewood, the event's founder, Nicole Holmes, reported 1400 athletes competing on the day. It was also reported that there were no major injuries sustained as part of the event. This event also served as a bid event for the AASCF Pinnacle event that was introduced during this year.

==== 2016 ====
Gymnastics Australia reiterated that they were recognised as the peak body for cheerleading by both the Australian Sport Commission and International Cheer Union in their 2016 annual report.

The industry saw a shift in 2016 regarding image. In response to the changing USASF uniform rules coming in as of the 2015–16 season in the United States, alongside the continued public outcry surrounding midriff uniforms within the sport, AASCF introduced a new rule that stated the cropped midriff uniforms were no longer allowed for any team that was competing in junior or younger age divisions. This rule was also introduced for World Cup Cheer and Dance events. This rule had been in place for Gymnastics Australia since 2006 to make a distinction between commercial and gymnastic cheerleading; however, until this point, cropped uniforms had been allowed at non-Gymnastics Australia competitions.

Continued growth and participation was seen across the sport with the number of gyms growing, and existing gyms moving into larger spaces. North Queensland Warriors Cheerleading had been founded in 2011 by Leah Buchanan at the Aitkenvale PCYC with 6 members, moving to a warehouse in Mt Louisa in 2013 due to growth, with continued growth to 70 members leading to another location move that was reported on by the Townsville Bulletin during 2016.

AASCF's Nationals event grew to a total of 10,278 athletes competing in 1606 routines, with the Australasian Pinnacle event seeing 2,230 athletes winning bids. Daily Telegraph article reported there were close to 1400 teams who competed with athletes ranging from 4 years old to 58 years old. The Gold Coast Bulletin also highlighted the importance of this event to the local economy, recognising that it brought a $24 million boost, with an estimated $780 spent per person.

A video from the 2016 All Star Battle went viral, featuring a video of the Oxygen All Stars Special Ability team "Lithium", which featured Debbie Stark, who competed in her wheelchair. This vitality attracted international media attention around the inclusivity of all star cheerleading in Australia at AASCF's events.

Battle of the Beaches also continued to see growth also in its outdoor event format, being held at Manly, NSW on Sydney's Northern Beaches once again in November 2016, hosting 1500 athletes across 150 teams from 30 programs. After this year's event, the organiser, Nicole Holmes, stated that she had attracted interest from teams from South Australia and Queensland to take part in the following year's event.

As well as the ongoing participation of Australian teams at the IASF Worlds events, international participation continued to grow for other events, highlighting Australian cheer globally. One of these teams was FAD Cheer and Dance, who sent a team in April 2016 to compete at the All Star Games in Las Vegas. Within a global context, the International Cheer Union achieved provisional recognition from the International Olympic Commission, sparking backlash within Australia based on misconceptions around the sport. As a result, the Australian cheer community began taking part in media interviews to highlight the reasons why this recognition by the IOC was valid and how cheerleading is a sport.

==== 2017 ====
In juxtaposition to the growth seen elsewhere in the community, Gymnastics Australia reported only 59 registered coaches and 1238 athletes registered across 105 clubs, highlighting their lowered position in the Australian cheerleading industry as a whole. Despite this, Australian Cheer Union under Gymnastics Australia continued to be the recognised governing body by both the International Cheer Union and Australian Sport Commission. With this decline in mind, Gymnastics Australia spent 2017 commissioning Suiko Consulting to review cheerleading in Australia, forming a working group to discuss their report findings.

Australian teams continued to participate at an international level, with teams competing at the 2017 IASF Cheerleading Worlds and ICU Cheerleading Worlds in Orlando, 2017 Cheer and Dance Global Games in Hawaii, and 2017 World University Championships in Orlando. To continue this growth, a partnership was formed between the Chinese Cheerleading Association (the governing body for the sport in China) with AASCF at the IASF Cheerleading Worlds in 2017. This partnership saw CCA send over 100 athletes to the AASCF NSW States event and AASCF send three of their 2016 National teams to compete in the China Cheerleading Open and Rizhao International Elite Cheerleading Games in China during 2017.

==== 2018 ====
2018 saw a major shift in the landscape of Australian cheer, with the year beginning with Gymnastics Australia releasing a statement announcing they would be ceasing to be the national governing body of cheerleading in Australia by the end of the year. Throughout 2018, Gymnastics Australia wrapped up operations, with a review of all policies and procedures to prepare an operations manual and handover procedure to the International Cheer Union for the incoming national federation.

To fill this gap, ACSA re-confirmed their intention to apply to ICU to be recognised as the governing body for cheerleading in Australia. This included application for their own ABN independent of AASCF. ICU received the documents for member application on 17 April 2018, and tabled these at their Annual General Meeting at 24 April 2018. However, following a review of these documents including the constitution and national structure of ACSA, ICU declined their applications on 17 May 2018 due to the constitution and structure being non-complaint with required criteria by ICU.

To ensure compliance with international sport authorities within the timeframe of Gymnastics Australia's handover and continue to allow international participation by Australian cheerleaders, ICU announced the establishment of a complaint national cheer federation under approval from Sports Australia on 8 December 2018. This organisation carried forward the name "Australian Cheer Union" from Gymnastics Australia, having a federated model with state members as its voting membership as was the standard of Australian Olympic recognised NSOs. In response to this, ACSA released a statement on 11 December 2018, stating their disagreement with the federated model due to the model requiring duplication of limited resources due to the size of Australia's cheer industry and supporting a unitary model as suggested by the Australian Sport Commission. A further statement reiterating ACSA's disagreement with the federated model was released on 21 December 2018, stating that the Australian cheer community should decide what their governing body looked like without interference from the International Cheer Union. This statement also outlined ACSA's plan moving forward with the absence of an official Sport Australia recognised NSO for the sport, with ACSA filling the gap establishing rules, safety guidelines, competition standards and training and accreditation for coaches and judges.

Infinite Spirit All Stars saw its Far North Queensland championships grow to 400 competitors with 1500 spectators, with teams competing from Rockhampton, Mackay, Cairns and Townsville.

The sport also continued to obtain media traction and coverage throughout the year about its growth and expansion, as well as its inclusion of disabled athletes.

==== 2019 ====
The ACSA cheer and dance event sanctioning standards were released in April 2019, outlining the general event standards including divisions, levels and categories, insurance, safety and accreditation, warm up area standards, and event performance area standards. These standards were adopted by a range of event producers for the year, including All Things Cheer, Aussie Gold, AASCF, Australian Cheer Elite, Cheer Unlimited Australia, Cheercon, Infinite Spirit All Stars and Spirit Industries, providing consistency between competitions. On 20 December 2019, ACSA released their constitution, outlining their objectives, application of income, membership categories and rights, meetings and proceedings at meetings, votes, ICU compliance and cooperation, discipline of members and by-laws, rights of patrons, directors powers and duties, committees, service of notice, indemnity and record inspection policies.

Australian Cheer Union (ACU) was officially established as its own independent not-for-profit organisation during 2019, with an interim board and interim state members appointed in May to drive the establish of a National Federation. Their first annual meeting was held on 19 December 2019, with a formal election of four directors to replace their interim board and represent Australian cheer. The continued growth of the sport saw programs that had historically been based in community locations rather than specialised facilities like most making the move into custom-built facilities, such as FAD Ipswich, as the demand for more professional and elite avenues in the sport grew.

International recognition also was given to AASCF founder, Rosemary Sims-James, as she was given the IASF Pioneer and Lifetime Achievement Award for leading and developing the sports of cheer and dance within Australia. Australia's first paracheer competitor took the floor in 2019, with Emily Quattrocchi taking the floor with Southern Cross Cheer.

=== 2020s (2020–current) ===
==== 2020 ====
Going into 2020, Australia had the third largest all-star cheerleading market in the world, coming behind the United States and Canada.

The beginning of 2020 saw the release of the Netflix docuseries, Cheer, in January. The series shone a new light onto competitive cheerleading, with Australian media releasing articles highlighting the cheerleading industry in Australia including teams that were sent to go to the Cheerleading Worlds in 2020 and how Australians could become involved in the sport. These articles helped highlight the difference between the NRL sideline cheerleaders and competitive cheerleading, reshaping the public's perception of cheerleading in the country and highlighting the athleticism behind allstar cheer. These media pieces also highlighted Australian competitions, with ABC interviewing Rosemary Sims of AASCF in order to show how the AASCF competitions have grown to more than 60,000 registered athletes across the country. During February 2020, a documentary that was filmed over the course of the 2019 AASCF Nationals event also aired on Melbourne's Channel 31, spotlighting the behind the scenes of the Nationals event as well as talking about the sport.

Media coverage continued throughout 2020, highlighting different demographics within the sport such as university teams, disabled athletes and the adult division, which enabled the sport to grow quickly with gyms growing from less than 30 members to almost 200 in less than seven years.

With this media spotlight and new introductory program, 2020 was set to see further growth for the cheerleading industry before the COVID-19 pandemic struck, with Australia pursuing a zero-COVID suppression strategy until late 2021, with strict lockdowns and contact tracing across the country. Due to cheerleading being a largely contact sport, it was impacted by the COVID-19 pandemic and associated lockdowns. As a result, ASCA released a range of COVID-19 recommendations about how the industry should navigate this, including best practice for trainings, hygiene guidelines, and gym closure order details and procedures. These guidelines and advice received updates over the course of the COVID-19 pandemics, adjusting for the changing situation. With many competition events cancelling in person events and transitioning to being virtual events due to the COVID-19 health restrictions, ACSA also released an update to the existing 2019 event sanctioning standards with adaptions provided for virtual competition standards to continue the standard of safety and provide a framework for virtual event delivery. As the country began to reopen from the COVID-19 lockdowns, ACSA then released a framework for the resumption of all star cheer and dance within Australia in line with the Sport Australia "Framework for Rebooting Sport in a COVID-19 Environment". This framework also received multiple updates throughout the pandemic to allow for adjustment in line with state and local government restrictions and the changing situation and recommendations.

2020 also exposed concerns around the safeguarding within Australian cheerleading, with sexual abuse allegations arising. During April 2020, a female Australian cheerleading coach faced court with allegations of having sexually exploiting one of the athletes she coached, with charges of the alleged sexual abuse of three athletes being pressed in July 2020. By September 2020, the prosecutors in the case announced their intention to proceed with allegations that involved 14 athletes in incidents that took place between August 2015 and December 2017. However, the trial for these charges were delayed due to a COVID-19 related backlog of court cases.

Following the release of the Athlete A documentary regarding the sexual abuse of young female gymnasts in the United States, the Australian Human Rights Commission undertook an independent review of gymnastics in Australia, leading to Sport Integrity Australia rolling out a National Integrity Framework for all Australian sports in 2021. This framework included child safeguarding policies, child safeguarding policy template for sporting organisations and child safe practices do's and don'ts with the goal of protecting minors from abuse in sport.

==== 2021 ====
The ongoing impacts of the COVID-19 pandemics meant that a number of changes were made to cheerleading within Australia, impacting the competitive environment within Australia. ollowing on from the previous year, Australian media continued to promote how inclusive the sport was for different demographics, such as adults and parents within the adult division.

Australia elite teams participated in the IASF 2021 Virtual Cheerleading and Dance Worlds event, with 10 Australian teams being crowned world champions and 16 teams in total placing.

==== 2022 ====
The Australian cheerleading community continued to recover from the impact of the COVID-19 pandemic on the industry, with event producers shifting their offerings to reflect the shifts due to these impacts. While the Battle at the Beaches event was postponed, CheerCon did offer a new event called Battle at the Bridge. This was held at Luna Park in Sydney during October, filling the spot of Battle at the Beaches on the calendar. They finished off the year with a virtual national championships event which saw 150 entries. The CheerCon 2022 New South Wales State Championships/Worlds Experience event marked the biggest cheerleading and dance event ever held in the state, with over 2600 athletes competing across 450 teams during the event.

September 2022 saw the Australian Cheer Sport Alliance announcing their official application for NSO recognition by Sport Australia due to the lack of NSO for all star cheer and dance in Australia since Gymnastics Australia stepping down in 2018. As part of this process, ACSA updated a range of policy documents and procedures. This also included their board charter (defining the roles, responsibilities and authorities of the ACSA board to set the direction, management and guidance of ACSA) and updating their constitution.

Adelaide gym All Abilities Cheer and Dance received media spotlight throughout 2022 as they travelled to the AASCF Nationals as a disability-only program that promoted participation of disabled athletes within the sport.

==== 2023 ====
In January 2023, ACSA released a statement confirming that their September 2022 NSO application had been denied. This statement also revealed that ACU had also submitted an application to be recognised as NSO, with varying eligibility requirements met by each organisation, expressing ACSA's intent to work together with ACU to create a resolution to bring the two organisations together.

During February 2023, the delayed trial of the female coach charged with a number of charges relating to sexual abuse of athletes began, at which time the coach pleaded not guilty. These charges included three counts of maintaining an unlawful sexual relationship with a child, one aggravated count of indecent assault and three basic counts of indecent assault, with four of the alleged victims being just 12 years old, spanning across more than 21 alleged incidents of abuse. This trial continued in the absence of a jury until 29 September 2023, at which time the coach was acquitted of all charges as Judge Joana Fuller concluded "In those circumstances I could not be satisfied beyond reasonable doubt that the touching occurred in circumstances of indecency", as during the trial that it was shown it was commonplace for athletes and coaches at that gym to discuss sexual topics and touch each other, including on the breasts, in breach of the safeguarding policies that both AASCF and Gymnastics Australia had publicly published during the relevant time period.

Australian cheer teams travelling internationally obtained media coverage throughout the year, such as Skybound Elite Allstars' trip to Hawaii, as well as Sirens' Anthem competing at the 2023 Cheerleading Worlds event.

==== 2024 and beyond ====
A shift in the current Australian event calendar began with AASCF releasing their first draft of their 2024 venues and dates, which included 2024 Nationals dates moved to the first weekend in December 2024.

Twenty teams from around Australia travelled to the US to compete at The Cheerleading Worlds. This was one of the most successful World Championships for Australian teams with 15 of the 20 teams placing in the Top 10. A team from Slacks Creek, Queensland placed 2nd in the International Large Coed Level 5 division and have gone down in history as the first gym to place in the Top 3 in their first year of operation. Millennium Allstars officially opened in 2023 and were awarded a bid to compete at Worlds. Under the guidance of their coaches they competed and placed 2nd in the World and went down in history for their achievement.

In April 2024, 5 teams from Australia competed at the International Cheer Union World Championships, these teams were coached by some of the best coaches in Australia. Both the Junior and Senior Coed teams placed first in their divisions with the Senior All Girl team competing in the highest division and placing 9th. Following this success Australia will next year have 2 Senior teams competing in the highest division at the ICU Championships.

== Governing bodies ==
=== Australian Cheer Union ===
The first iteration of Australian Cheer Union (ACU) was formed in 2008 as a subsidiary of Gymnastics Australia, designed to manage cheerleading as a sport. During this period, ACU was recognised as the official governing body of Australian cheerleading by the International Cheerleading Federation (ICF), International All Star Federation (IASF), International Cheerleading Union (ICU) and the Australian Sports Commission (ASC).

In December 2018, ICU announced the establishment of a national cheer federation under approval from Sports Australia, forming the current iteration of ACU. This current version of ACU continues to be recognised by ICU as the official body for cheerleading in Australia. ACU is currently working towards the goal of advancing cheerleading and performance cheerleading in Australia with a focus on healthy competition and participation as well as overall industry growth, working very closely with ICU to obtain recognition of cheerleading by the International Olympic Committee. As part of their current strategic plan, ACU aims to achieve recognition as a National Sporting Organisation with Sports Australia and the Australian Olympic Committee.

After submitting an application to Sports Australia in 2022, ACU were denied recognition as a National Sport Organisation on the grounds that two competing organisations had applied for NSO recognition with varying eligibility requirements met by each organisation.

ACU offers a membership program, offering three membership options for different demographics: participant memberships, offered for athletes and participants; technical memberships, offered to coaches and judges; and memberships offered to clubs and studios.

=== Australian Cheer Sport Alliance ===
The Australian Cheer Sport Alliance (ACSA) was formed in 2017 by a number of event producers in order to formalise the role that coaches, gym owners and event producers had been delivering as key stakeholders to the sport. Founding board members included members from Gymnastics Australia, Fédération Internationale de Gymnastique, Australian All Star Cheer Federation, and Aussie Gold.

ACSA provides a wide range of resources and policies to promote, develop and support all star cheer and dance in Australia, including standardised age grids, skill lists and rules to be implemented by its sanctioned event producers.

ACSA offers a membership program for both event producers and allstar cheer and dance programs, with members having a voice to help shape ACSA's standardised rules, safety guidelines and competition standards to establish best practice guidelines for integrity of allstar cheer and dance as a sport. Event producer membership allows for event producers to become sanctioned events, with the event producer being required to follow a range of safeguarding standards and the ACSA cheer and dance event sanctioning standards. Club members are bound to the club membership standards including child safeguarding requirements, insurance coverage and staff qualifications to ensure a safe more regulated environment within allstar cheerleading and dance within Australia, with parents and athletes able to access a list of ACSA endorsed member gyms via their website.

In September 2022, ACSA applied for national sporting organisation recognition by Sport Australia, however, this application was denied by Sport Australia on the basis that both ACSA and ACU had submitted applications as competing organisations, with both having varying eligibility requirements met. At the time of denial, ACSA released a press statement updating the cheer community of this denial, and stating that it looks forward to working with ACU to bring the two organisations together.

=== Gymnastics Australia ===
Gymnastics Australia (GA) began acting as the governing body of Australian cheerleading in 2002, including the sport under their "General Gymnastics" stream and establishing a working committee led by Nerine Cooper, as well as holding the first national championship.

In July 2008, GA formed the Australian Cheer Union (ACU) to serve as the official governing body to standardise cheer rules, advance coach and judge education and safety, and coordinate a national calendar for cheerleading. ACU would remain under Gymnastics Australia management until 2018, being recognised as the official governing body by the International Cheerleading Federation (ICF), International All Star Federation (IASF), International Cheerleading Union (ICU) and the Australian Sports Commission (ASC).

During this time, GA recognised cheerleading as its own unique gym sport, alongside other disciplines such as artistic, rhythmic, trampoline, acrobatics and aerobic gymnastics. This included providing standardised level programs, providing Australian Sports Commission recognised coach and judge accreditation, competitions, camps and workshops, and cheerleading supplies such as footwear, uniforms and poms, delivered under the AUS Cheer brand from 2008.

After a steady decline in participation in GA's cheerleading programs despite growth in programs under other providers, many attempts at independent consultants restructuring their governance, and a petition asking for GA to resign as governing body, GA finally stepped from their role as the official governing body of cheerleading in Australia in 2018.

== University/College Cheerleading ==
In the United States, cheerleading is considered a serious athletic team sport at the college level; however, in Australia it falls into an area where it is more of a social sport club approach, with teams being formed by student clubs that are approved by the universities. These clubs often offer both cheer and dance teams that compete at all-star cheer and dance events around the country within a specific university division with its own modified rules. University/college-based participation within Australian cheerleading competitions dates back to the early 2000s, with university teams being included in the first cheerleading nationals held by Gymnastics Australia.

To participate in a university team, students must hold current ID cards from the university, ensuring that the team is made entirely of university students from that university. In the event that a team contains any athletes who are not a student at that university (whether that be a non-student, alumni or student from another university), the team are required to compete in the open all-star division. This is to help ensure that the university division maintains the spirit of being representative of each university.

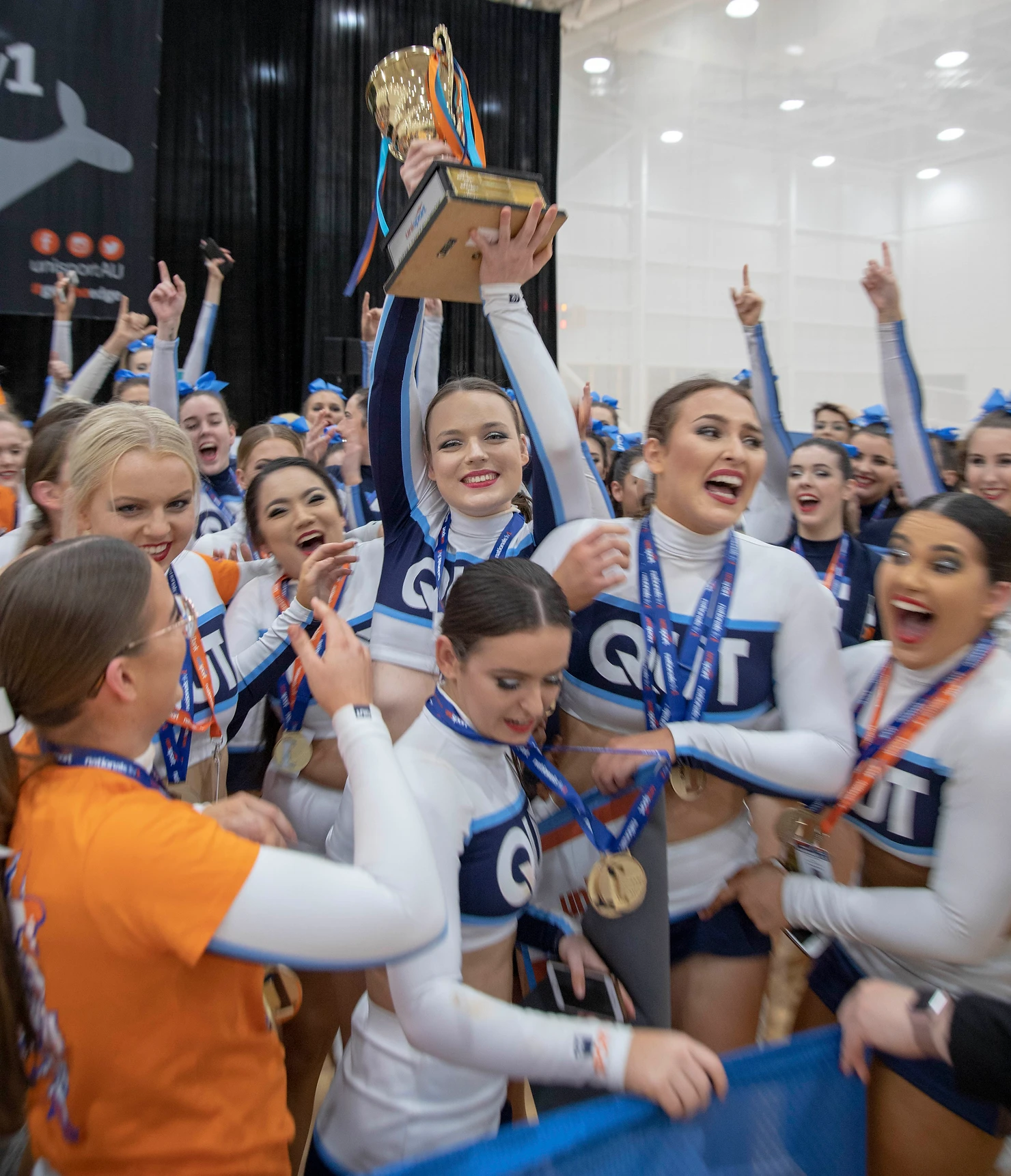
QUT Cheer winning National Div 1 Champions at 2018 UniSport Championships

In addition to all-star competitions, university cheerleading teams also have the opportunity to compete at UniSport Nationals, an annual event that allows universities to compete head-to-head in a range of university-offered sports.

To prepare for these competitions, university cheerleading teams often train at local all-star cheer gyms, being coached by a staff member of the gym or high-level athletes from the gym, providing access to expertise and safe facilities to build skills. This close affiliation also often leads to opportunities for the university teams to participate in the gym's culture in events such as showcases, allowing university teams to contribute to the wider cheerleading community in Australia.

Universities that offer cheerleading and dance clubs in Australia include, but are not limited to:

- Australian Catholic University (Brisbane, Melbourne and Sydney) (ACU)
- Australian National University (ANU)
- Bond University
- Charles Stuart University (Wagga Wagga) (CSU)
- Curtin University
- Deakin University
- Edith Cowan University (ECU)
- Griffith University
- La Trobe University
- Macquarie University
- Monash University
- Murdoch University
- Queensland University of Technology (QUT)
- RMIT University
- Swinburne University of Technology
- University of Adelaide
- University of Melbourne
- University of New England (UNE)
- University of New South Wales (UNSW)
- University of Newcastle (UON)
- University of Queensland (UQ)
- University of Southern Queensland (UniSQ)
- University of the Sunshine Coast (USC)
- University of Sydney (USyd)
- University of Technology Sydney (UTS)
- University of Western Australia (UWA)
- University of Wollongong (UOW)

=== University Cheer Rules ===
In Australia, university cheer teams must follow specific rules and guidelines that are separate to the regular traditional all-star rules, and are outlined by the Australian All Star Cheerleading Alliance.

In order to compete in the university division, the team must be made of 100% current university student athletes that compete at the same institutions, with student athletes providing their current university student ID card numbers on the entry forms and verifying their cards with event officials. Crossovers of athletes between university and all-star teams are allowed, but university athletes cannot compete twice within the same level.

If a team has a mixture of current students, alumni, athletes from other universities and/or outside athletes, there is an option to enter as an open university cheer team. These teams compete in all-star divisions, following the all-star rules and regulations, and as such, cannot crossover into all-star teams.

The ACSA rule outlines are based on the IASF/UWCC rules to determine which skills are allowed in each level, with exceptions for the level 1 and 1/2 NT divisions to allow any IASF level-appropriate tumbling. While tumbling is permitted in the non-tumble categories in this way, it is not scored separately.

The university division offers the opportunity for teams to compete at level 1NT (both all girl and coed teams), all girl level 1/2NT, coed level 1/2NT, all girl level 3/4, coed level 3/4, all girl elite, coed elite, all girl premier and coed premier. The elite level is equivalent to IASF level 5, with the premier level equivalent to IASF level 6.

The scoring depends on the level that the team competes in. Level 1NT teams are judged on the equivalent all-star non-tumble score sheet, with the division not being split into coed and all-girl categories. Level 1/2NT are judged on the all-girl university score sheet; however, the division is still split into coed and all-girl for rankings. Levels 3/4, elite and premier teams are judged on either the coed or all girl university score sheet, dependent on the category they are entered in. All teams above level 1 utilise two score sheets, marking the teams on both crowd leading and the cheer routine, with specific separately judged elements.

Routine time limits also depend on the level that the team is competing within. For example, a level 1NT team has a 2-minute time limit; however, 1/2NT and higher teams all have a time limit of 2 minutes 30 seconds. Penalties apply to a team if their routine exceeds this time limit, with deduction systems following the same system as all-star routines.

As part of a university team's routine, they are required to present a cheer crowd leading portion, which is designed to represent the traditional roots of university cheerleading being a side line spirit sport.

In this section, the judges assess the team's skills in encouraging the crowd's involvement, using signs, poms, megaphones and motions, their ability and energy in leading the crowd, incorporation of skills, performance factor and overall cheer impression. These criteria aim to capture how well a team can involve and engage the crowd.

In both the divisions using the University All-Girl scorecard and the University Coed scorecard, the teams are judged on their use of stunts, pyramids, basket tosses, and group tumbling.

However, in the teams using the university all-girl scoresheet, teams are also judged on dance, which they are not in the coed division. In comparison, the coed scoresheet adds the category of coed skills and partner stunts to be judged which is missing from the all-girl scoresheet.

Divisions	Gender Restrictions	Level Restrictions
University	N/A	1NT
University All Girl	All Girl	1/2NT, 3/4
University Coed	1+ Male	1/2NT, 3/4
University Elite	All Girl	Elite (5)
University Elite SM Coed	1-4 Males	Elite (5)
University Elite LG Coed	5-9 Males	Elite (5)
University Elite SP Coed	Up to 13 males	Elite (5)
University Premier	All Girl	Premier (6)
University Premier SM Coed	1-4 Males	Premier (6)
University Premier LG Coed	5-9 Males	Premier (6)
University Premier SP Coed	Up to 13 Males	Premier (6)

== CheerABILITY ==
In 2011, event producers began offering a special needs division, later renamed to CheerABILITY, in order to provide inclusive opportunities for athletes of all abilities to participate in all-star cheerleading and dance within Australia.

The division offers two main structures: independent and unified. In the independent structure, 100% of the team is made up of adaptive ability athletes, allowing them to compete and showcase their skill and talent. Within the unified structure, no more than 75% of the team can be made up of non-adaptive ability athletes, and combines both abled and disabled athletes in a way that highlights the disabled athletes while fostering inclusivity and teamwork. Athletes without disabilities are required to wear distinctive and identifiable 3-inch arm bands on both arms.

Additionally, assistants are allowed in both structures to provide support to the disabled athletes. Assistants may provide one-on-one support or group support; however, they are not considered athletes on the team and do not contribute to the scorecard. Their role is to act as extra safety spotters or give directions via prompting from off the floor or side of the floor while not impairing the judges' view. Assistants must be registered for the event and dressed in all black.

Within the cheerABILITY division, teams may compete cheer routines, non-tumble cheer routines, group stunt routines, partner stunt routines and assistant partner stunt routines. With most events also offering all-star dance divisions, there is a corresponding danceABILITY division to serve the same purpose, allowing athletes to compete within any offered dance genre including jazz, hip hop, pom, lyrical/contemporary and kick.

To be eligible to participate within this division, athletes must meet impairment eligibility criteria based on the Paralympics' impairment classifications, which include:

- Impaired muscle power
- Impaired passive range of movement
- Limb deficiency
- Leg length difference
- Short stature
- Hypertonia
- Ataxia
- Athetosis
- Visual impairment
- Intellectual impairment (including fragile X syndrome, Down syndrome, autism spectrum disorders, foetal alcohol syndrome, Apert syndrome)
- Hearing impairment

Adaptive abilities athletes may compete in cheer levels 1 to 4, with rules based on the IASF rules that have further been adapted to ensure the safety and fair participation of all athletes participating.

These rule adaptions include:

- Wheelchair users must have all wheels in contact with the performance surface when basing stunts and pyramids, with an appropriate anti-tip attachment attached for safety.
- Wheelchairs must be visually locked when being used as a base for athletes to stand or place any weight on the chair.
- Non-motorised wheelchairs must have at least 2 wheels on the floor at all times, which must be either 2 front or 2 back wheels with no tipping side to side. Motorised wheelchairs must have all 4 wheels on the performance surface at all times.
- If being pushed, wheelchairs must not be released during motion.
- All athletes who are spotting, catching and/or cradling a skill must have mobility through their lower body to absorb the impact of the skill and adequate lateral speed to compete the skill. These athletes must also have minimum one arm extended beyond the elbow to adequately assist with the skill.
- Release moves and dismounts must return to the original bases, with an exception being given if the original bases are not physically capable of catching the release move as required. In this situation, the skill may be caught by individuals who were not the original bases.
- Mobility devices may be used to aid the flyer in loading into a stunt and/or pyramid.
- All mobility equipment including prothesis and braces are considered part of the athletes unless they are removed. If removed, they are then considered a legal prop until replaced on or returned to the athlete.
- Tumbling while holding or in contact with any prop is not allowed, with the exception of the prop being mobility equipment.
- Basket tosses are not allowed, including load in/squish and waist level cradles.
- Teams wishing to compete above level 2 must apply via video submission to the ACSA CADA Committee to receive written approval. This written approval must be provided at the time of entry to the event.
- All stunts and pyramids at prep level or above require an abled non-adaptive abilities athlete or assistant to act as a spotter/safety spotter.
- Spotted and assisted tumbling is not allowed.
- There is no limit to the number of assistants allowed around the perimeter of the floor in a squat position provided that they are following the assistant rules; however, only up to 3 coaches and/or assistants are allowed to signal from in front of the mat.

Violations of the CheerABILITY specific rules incur up to a 2-point deduction, while IASF legality rule violations incur a 1-point deduction within this division. Minor building bobbles and building/tumble falls do not receive deductions, receiving a warning instead, on the provision that the error does not cause the skill to become unsafe. However major building falls are still deducted.

Teams are scored using a separate ACSA provided scoring rubric at ACSA sanctioned events to reflect the changed rules and adaptive ability status of the athletes. This score sheet is broken into three sections, which are further broken into sub-categories:

- Building
  - Stunt difficulty
  - Pyramid difficulty
  - Stunt/Pyramid execution drivers
  - Number of athletes participating in stunts/pyramid
  - Number of stunts performed
- Tumbling
  - Standing tumbling difficulty
  - Running tumbling difficulty
  - Jump difficulty
  - Number of athletes participating in tumbling and jumps
- Overall
  - Stunt creativity
  - Pyramid creativity
  - Dance
  - Showmanship/Appropriate athlete impression
  - Routine composition

2023 ACSA CheerABILITY Age Divisions
Division	Age	Level Restrictions
CheerABILITY - Independent	All ages	1, 2, 3, 4
CheerABILITY - Unified	All ages	1, 2, 3, 4

== Semi-Competitive Programs ==
Within Australia, two semi-competitive programs are offered: Cheerstars and Cheersport.

=== Cheersport ===
Cheersport is a semi-competitive program program that was established by the event producer, Cheerbrandz. Cheersport offers access to competitive cheerleading without the same level of financial and time commitment, and is distinguished from elite all-star cheerleading by the use of a different skill level system.

Instead of using the USASF/IASF style levels that are used in competitive cheerleading, Cheersport assigns grades that progress athletes up at a slower pace.

Cheersport Grade	Elite All-star Level Equivalent
Grade 1	Level 1 Restricted
Grade 2	USASF Level 1
Grade 3	Advanced Level 1
Grade 4	USASF Level 2
Grade 5	Advanced Level 2
Grade 5	USASF Level 3

The scoresheet is also altered from the regular competitive scoresheet. Some of these differences include:

- Routines are only required to be 1 minute 30 seconds long (as opposed to 2 minutes, 30 seconds)
- Difficulty is removed from the scoresheet
- Group uniformity scoring section is adapted from dance scoresheets in a way that encourages teamwork
- Performance factor plays a large part in the scoresheet
- A different stunt quantity rubric is used in order to encourage coaches to ensure all athletes have equal opportunity to perform and experience the sport. This rubric is called "maximum groups possible" and is based on the total number of athletes on the floor divided by 4 (the number of a full stunt group) in order to calculate the number of possible stunt groups.
- Teams are not scored on musicality, and recycled mixes, single songs and 8-count tracks are encouraged to maintain a low-cost option for the athletes.
- Uniforms are not judged, and teams are encouraged to use low-cost affordable athletic looking uniforms.

Cheersport is not listed as a division option by the Australian Cheer Sport Alliance in 2023 and is exclusively offered at Cheerbrandz events currently.

=== CheerStars ===
The CheerStars program was launched in 2020 as a project by the Australian Independent Event Producers group (Aussie Gold Cheer and Dance, CheerCon, Cheer Unlimited Australia, Spirit Industries Australia). Due to Cheer Unlimited Australia and Spirit Industries Australia becoming defunct since the launch of the CheerStars program, CheerStars divisions are currently only offered at CheerCon and Aussie Gold events; however, this allows for participation at events in every state in Australia (however no events are held in the two territories).

This program has a similar goal to the Cheersport program from Cheerbrandz, providing an introductory dance and cheer program that is a stepping stone between IASF levels 1 and 3.

As such, it also does not utilise the competitive levels system, also providing an alternative graded progression system:

Cheerstars Division/Level	Equivalent competitive IASF level
Restricted 1	IASF Level 1 with restrictions
Stage 1	IASF Level 1
Restricted 2	IASF Level 2 with restrictions
Stage 2	IASF Level 2
Restricted 3	IASF Level 3 with restrictions
Stage 3	IASF Level 3

The scoresheet is also altered from the regular competitive scoresheet. Some of these differences include:

- CheerStars routines have no minimum music time requirement, with a recommended time between 1 minute 30 seconds and 2 minutes 30 seconds.
- Teams are not judged on music mixes, with three pre-mixed free tracks of different lengths and three eight-count tracks of different lengths provided by CheerStars and teams being welcomed to use their own previously used music.
- Teams are not judged on their uniform, and encouraged to use options they have in their club already such as recycled uniforms or low cost options such as club training wear. Uniform company TLC Spiritwear, owned by Nerine Cooper from Aussie Gold, released a range of CheerStars specific uniforms to provide a low cost accessible option for teams that were looking for a more formal uniform for teams.
- Divisions were previously not split by age, with athletes of any age allowed to be entered to make up a team and suggestion made to structure the team per the traditional age group for similar age groupings. However, as of 2023, divisions began being split by maximum age that is used on the ACSA age grid for each division for tiny through senior divisions, and a minimum age of 14 and over being applied for open teams and 22 and over for adult teams.
- A new scoring system was introduced in 2023, to encourage coaches to focus on the individual execution drivers and educate regarding these. The focus continued to be execution with no difficulty scorecard, and is weighted similarly to an all-star scoresheet. Scores were given for building, tumbling, jumps and overall, rated using how many athletes successfully met each criterion and/or how often the team met the criteria throughout the routine when performing the skill (rarely/none, sometimes/some athletes, often/most athletes, always/all athletes).
- In 2023, placings were introduced for CheerStars teams, with teams placing 1st to 5th being awarded in the same way that the other teams at the event within the all-star competitive categories are awarded (medal/trophies etc.). However teams that place 6th and below will also be acknowledge at the awards ceremonies.
- Deductions are not given for rule violations, with the safety judge providing feedback if skills are performed in an illegal or unsafe manner.

CheerStars divisions are not listed as divisions by the Australian Cheer Sport Alliance.

== All Star Age & Level Divisions ==
Within Australia, the competitive all-star cheerleading landscape has been historically largely been modelled after the USASF/IASF rule guidelines regarding age divisions, difficulty levels and terminology, with variations by event provider. (Note: For example, "The CUA Championship Series will follow the USASF Cheer Rules as the governing documents for safety and participation. Please refer to the USASF website links below for complete listing of 2016-2017 Cheer Safety Rules." Similarly, "AUS Cheer will follow the 2011-2013 USASF/IASF Cheer Level Rules Chart and 2011-2012 USASF/IASF Dance Rules.". AASCF, WCCD, CheerCon, Aussie Gold, and SIA also refer to the USASF documents.)

However, since the founding of the Australian Cheer Sport Alliance (ACSA), the group has published their own adaptions of the USASF/IASF rules that are adopted by their sanctioned event producers which has aligned many event providers.

As in the United States, competitions are grouped into divisions that are based on a combination of the team's age category, difficulty level and size. Certain categories are also further separated into "all-girl" (females only) and "co-ed" (mixture of genders) groups. For large events with high numbers of teams registered in one division, organisations also can then further split the divisions based on the team's size or the gym/studio's size to form a manageable number of teams within a division. For example, a team may compete in divisions such as "extra small youth level 1", or "senior co-ed level 5".

Some event producers may also offer competition divisions for the Cheersport or CheerStars semi-competitive program teams, CheerABILITY teams, scholastic teams and university teams. Depending on the competition, gyms may be able to enter group stunts, partner stunts, assisted partner stunts and cheer solos and duos as well as entering in the typical full team format.

All-star age groups are based on the competitors' ages at 31 December of the competition year (how many years old they turn at their birthday during the given calendar year). In contrast, USASF has used age at May or August for normal divisions and 31 December for International divisions.

Currently overlap in the age categories enables an athlete to compete in multiple teams who are entered in different age categories. For example, an 11 year old could compete on teams that are entered in the youth, junior and senior age categories.

The age ranges have changed over the years as the sport grows, evolves and changes to concerns regarding safety. They also varied by event providers, which has led to a lack of uniformity across the cheerleading industry. The most recent changes announced will see the open division raise their minimum age to align with the IASF age grid standards by 2025, with a minimum age of 15 years old being enforced in 2024 and a minimum age of 16 years old being enforced in 2025.

The age category of the team also restricts the difficulty level that the team may be entered into for safety reasons, with younger age category teams not being allowed to enter higher levels for safety. There are also "sub-categories" within the junior and senior age divisions that do not allow teams with younger age category eligible athletes to enter the higher levels.

During 2021, adjustments were made to the age eligibility grid to allow athletes one year older or one year younger than the age grid limits to participate in the teams in recognition of the impact of the COVID-19 pandemic, with the exception of the tiny novice minimum age not being lowered due to safety. While this remained in place for 2022, the extra year of eligibility was removed with the age grid reverting to its normal limits in 2023. As of 2023, age categories are offered in both ACSA Australian grouping as well as IASF age categories for teams that are competing within Australia for a bid to an international event. While most events generally align with the ACSA Australian age grid during 2023, non-sanctioned events were not required to. This led to deviation in the age grid offerings.

As with previous years, ACSA had minimised their team size/coed quantity splits in their age grid, in order to provide clarity, allowing event producers to split these divisions as needed. Where applicable, divisions were split using the following ACSA team size guidelines:

- Extra Small - 6 - 15 athletes
- Small - 16. - 24 athletes
- Large - 25 - 30 athletes
- Extra Large - 31 - 38 athletes
- Coed - At the EP's discretion regarding number of males

The same division split rules also applied to AASCF's divisions. The team size splits also applied to Cheerbrandz, with Cheerbrandz creating a mandatory coed split when there were 2 or more coed teams in a division.

The 2023 age and division grids removed the COVID-19 related extensions to age eligibility that had previously offered the opportunity to compete in an age division that an athlete was one year above or below the age grids.

For teams within the IASF divisions at ACSA events, levels 5 - 7 athletes may be 1 year younger in official eligibility while competing in the Australian season but must meet the minimum age requirement in the year of international competition.

ACSA's 2023 age grid also made notes that 2023 marked the last year for senior 4.2. During 2024, it is expected ACSA will only offer this division in the open age division, with the level being phased out of the Australian age grid entirely by 2025.

Both AASCF and ACSA have announced that they have planned to increase their minimum age for their open age group to 15 years old in 2024, with the minimum age rising again to 16 years old in 2025, in order to align with the IASF standards.

=== Difficulty Levels ===
To ensure fair competition and safety, the age categories are further divided into difficulty levels that are based on the athletes' skill sets. The Australian level system is modelled after the USASF/IASF level system, dividing age categories across 7 different levels that allow different skills to be performed, as well as level 4.2 and novice also being offered. The levels that are offered vary by age, with younger age categories being prevented from competing in higher difficulty level teams.

Within each level, there are detailed lists of the allowed and disallowed skills that are allowed to be used in a team's tumbling, stunts, pyramids and tosses, with teams being required to follow the core IASF rules for each level. This enables teams to compete with similarly skilled athletes to create a fair competition, as well as preventing athletes from attempting moves beyond their ability for safety purposes.

==== § Novice ====
In order to reflect the changing needs of the Australian cheerleading community, a modified version of level 1 was introduced by some event providers during 2013.

==== 1 Restricted ====
Before introducing the novice division, Cheerbrandz historically offered a variation known as level 1 restricted that served the same purpose. In level 1 restricted, teams would follow the level 1 rules with striations around which skills were allowed to provide a safe introduction to cheerleading.

==== Level 2+ ====
During 2014, WCCD trialled a new difficulty level, Level 2+, for their scholastic high school divisions. This was designed as level that provided a transition for school teams between level 2 and 3. This allowed the team members who needed it a chance to solidify skills, while still allowing the more advanced athletes to showcase their skills. Teams were allowed to perform skills at both level 2 and 3; however, the routine was not allowed to showcase entirely level 3 elements.

This meant that a team could utilise spotlight tumblers who were performing a level 3 tumbling pass while the majority of the team is performing a level 2 tumbling pass, or having some stunt groups perform a level 2 stunt while some perform the level 3 equivalent.

WCCD did not continued this offering into 2015.

==== Level 4.2 ====
Teams competing in level 4.2 are allowed to complete stunting skills that are allowed at level 4; however, they are restricted to level 2 tumbling. However, this level is currently being phased out of Australian cheer by the Australian Cheer Sport Alliance, with level 4.2 no longer being offered in senior divisions as of 2024, and no longer being offered in open divisions as of 2025.

== Competitive Scoring ==
Scoring systems have historically varied depending on the event organiser.

For example, in 2015 four event producers formed the Australian Independent Event Producers group which formulated a common scoring system to use among their competitions. This scoring system, named the Australian Independent Scoring System (AISS), also known as the AIEP, (Note: Introducing the "Australian Independent Scoring System" appears on the web sites of Aussie Gold CUA, and SIA.) differed from the AASCF scoring system that was being used at the time. Under this scoring system, building skills was weighted as 50% of the score, with tumbling making up 30% and dance and choreography forming the last 20%.

At AASCF competitions, the components of cheer routines – standing and running tumbling, jumps, stunts, pyramids, and tosses – are scored separately out of 5.0 for difficulty and for technique for a total of 10.0 points. Stunts and pyramids are also scored for creativity, making this section of the routine worth 15.0 points instead of 10.0 points. Building skills (stunts, pyramids, tosses) account for 45 points out of 100 (35 of 90 at Level 1 where there are no tosses); tumble skills (tumbling and jumps) for 30 points, and an additional 25 points are scored on dance break, overall routine composition and performance. Points are deducted for falls and rule violations.

However, since the foundation of the Australian Cheer Sport Alliance (ACSA) in 2017, ACSA sanctioned event producers have introduced the same scoring rubric, creating consistency across the industry for sanctioned event providers.

The ACSA scoring rubric is broken into building, tumbling and overall, with the rubric sheets reflecting the requirements of the age and level division (e.g. a different building score sheet is used for senior and below age divisions compared to open divisions which are further split by level and coed/all-girl).

On the current ACSA scoresheet, deductions can be given, typically removing points from the final score for a range of reasons that fall into the two broad categories of routine infractions (stunt bobbles and falls, tumble falls, jump falls) and rule violations (skills performed illegally out of level, time limit violation, boundary violation, minimum athlete requirement, image policy violation). While most deductions attract point deductions from the final score given to the performance, a breach of the eligibility requirements such as age eligibility, inaccurate rosters and crossover rules as well as a breach of the maximum athlete number requirement can both attract disqualification.

== Performance Cheer/Allstar Dance ==
The sport of allstar dance is recognised as a discipline of cheerleading by the International Cheer Union (international governing body for cheerleading), who includes divisions for hip hop, pom and jazz performance cheer at their ICU World Cheerleading Championships annually. Allstar dance is also recognised as a cheerleading discipline as performance cheer by the Australian Cheer Union with the Australian Cheer Sport Alliance also overseeing and delivering guidance and policy for the allstar dance community as part of their cheer governance work.

Allstar cheerleading competitions have historically commonly included divisions for allstar dance teams, with early competition providers such as Gymnastics Australia, AASCF, AUSCheer, and World Cup Cheerleading in the 2000s era when the sport was first developing in Australia.

=== Styles ===
Over the years, the styles of dance included under allstar dance/performance cheer within Australia have varied, and continue to vary from event provider to event provider. However, in 2023, the following are the listed styles by the Australian Cheer Sport Alliance, AASCF and the Australian Cheer Union:

- Hip Hop: This category emphasises the collective execution of moves, demanding synchronisation, uniformity, and precise spacing among the dancers. A successful routine in this category combines dynamic choreography with a keen sense of musicality, leveraging staging, intricate movements, and athleticism to create a captivating performance. Costuming plays a pivotal role in reflecting the distinctive style of this category, ensuring that the dancers reflect the category style.
- Jazz: This category offers a fusion of traditional and stylised movements, executed with strength, precision, and a commanding presence. Within performance cheer, jazz encompasses a spectrum of jazz styles, from traditional and commercial jazz to musical theatre and jazz funk, incorporating intricate combinations, formation changes, group dynamics, leaps, and turns. There is an emphasis on technical excellence, including proper execution, extension, control, body placement, and team uniformity, while infusing each movement with style and musical interpretation. Jazz routines are a lively celebration of high-energy choreography, with dynamic transitions that harmonize with the rhythm of the music, creating a motivating and electrifying overall impression. The choreography may range from crisp and aggressive to moments of softness, with the movement complementing the musicality of the performance. To complete the package, costuming should mirror the distinctive style of jazz dance.
- Pom: This category is characterised by mastery of precise Pom motion technique, with sharpness and cleanliness, while also drawing inspiration from Jazz, Hip Hop, and High Kick styles. A key emphasis lies in the collective execution, with a strong focus on synchronisation, uniformity, and spacing among the dancers. The choreography of a Pom routine is dynamic and visually captivating, showcasing musicality and staging with fluid and imaginative transitions, variations in levels and groups, and intricate movement sequences. Poms play an essential role throughout the routine, and costuming is expected to mirror the distinctive style of this category. Athletes are required to use poms for at least 80% of the routine to deliver clean, sharp, and precise motions while incorporating dance technical elements. Visual impact is crucial, encompassing elements like level changes, group formations, and the creative use of different coloured poms.
- Lyrical/Contemporary: This category offers a fusion of organic, pedestrian, and traditional modern or ballet styles intertwined with the lyrical and rhythmic nuances of the music. This category places a strong emphasis on collective execution, demanding precise synchronisation, uniformity, and impeccable spacing among the dancers. The choreography of a Lyrical/Contemporary routine is dynamic and combines musicality, staging, intricate movements, and technical prowess. Additionally, the dancers' costumes should mirror the unique style of this category, ensuring a visually cohesive presentation that enhances the overall performance.
- High Kick: This category is a showcase of inventive kick styles blended with a diverse range of skills and creative staging. The choreography must consistently feature an array of kicks, encompassing high kicks, low kicks, diagonal kicks, fan kicks, jump kicks, and more. The core elements of a successful routine in this category hinge on precision, impeccable timing, meticulous control, technical prowess, and the uniformity of kick height. Each kick should exhibit forceful execution, with one foot remaining grounded while the other lifts dynamically. It is crucial that kicks are seamlessly integrated throughout the entire routine, as their inadequate utilisation can impact the overall impression and score. The ultimate goal is to achieve synchronised, straight-line kicks at the same height, even among dancers of varying sizes, ensuring a visually stunning and technically impressive performance.

Now defunct all star dance styles that have been offered in Australia include, but are not limited to:

- Lyrical: Lyrical utilised IASF's dance rules to combine the principles of jazz and ballet. An emphasis placed on proper technical execution, flexibility use, balance and mood. The routine contained fluid movement with a focus on emotions that complimented the musical selection. This style was included during the 2013 - 2015 seasons.
- Modern/Contemporary: Modern/Contemporary utilised IASF's dance rules. This style implemented principles of fall and recovery or contract and release, and weight sharing, in order to express the dancer's inner feelings as they related to the musical or narrative piece. This style was included during the 2013 - 2015 seasons.
- Open: Open dance allowed any style of dance with any age allowed. This was to be done within 5 minutes, before changing to 3 minutes during the 2012 season. This division did not return for the 2013 season.

=== Difficulty Levels ===
Within Australia, allstar dance/performance cheer is split by difficulty into three major levels within the age divisions:

- Novice: Novice is offered as a beginner option, with the goal being for novice dance teams to perfect the basic dance skills before attempting harder skills. As a result, skills and difficulty are restricted for safety, with a difficulty score cap of 7.5 out of 10 applied for scoring. This is similar to the way that the novice division functions within typical allstar cheerleading.
- All Star/Intermediate: The name for this level varies depending on competition providers, but this functions as a standard competition level for teams who have progressed out of novice but are not yet skill ready for advanced/elite/worlds level routines. At ACSA sanctioned competitions, intermediate division teams also have skill limitations placed upon their routines; however, these limitations are less restrictive than those placed upon novice teams to allow for the athletes to progress in skill difficulty.
- Elite/Advanced: Elite/Advanced categories have no skill difficulty restrictions placed upon them, with the teams following IASF worlds rules and age groups. Elite divisions begin being offered from the youth age group onwards. For teams competing within the AASCF event framework, a team is only eligible to compete in the elite division at AASCF Nationals if they have competed at least once before within the division earlier in the season.

A dancer cannot compete within two difficulty divisions within the same style i.e. a dancer cannot compete in both a novice and intermediate jazz team, but could compete in a novice jazz team and intermediate hip hop team. Likewise, a dancer could not compete in both an intermediate and advanced pom team but could compete in an intermediate lyrical team and advanced pom team.

=== Age Divisions ===
Age groupings for performance cheer are based on the competitors' ages at 31 December of the competition year. Currently overlap in the way the age category structure allows an athlete to compete in multiple teams entered in different age categories. For example, an 8 year old could compete in the mini, youth and junior age divisions in different styles. The age ranges have changed over the years as the sport grows and evolves, with further changes set to be enforced in the coming 2 years.

The age category of the team also restricts the style of dance that the team may be entered into for safety reasons. At this stage, only teams of junior age and above are eligible to compete a high kick style dance routine.

As with allstar cheerleading, ACSA's age grids diverge from providers such as AASCF and Cheerbrandz. This poses conflict as AASCF remains Australia's largest event provider however does not follow the current standardised age grid.

For example, both ACSA sanctioned events and AASCF separated novice teams from allstar teams, where as Cheerbrandz only offered a novice split if there were 3 or more entries, with all novice styles judged against each other unless there were 10 or more entries in a division that would result in 3 entries in both divisions after a split.

Division	Event Provider	Difficulty Level	Age/Birth Year	Gender	Team Type (Size if applicable)	Athlete Number Requirements	Style Restrictions
Tiny	ACSA	Novice	6 years and under (Born 2017 or later)	Female/Male	Tiny Novice	4 - 36 dancers	Jazz, Hip Hop, Pom, Lyrical/Contemporary
Tiny	ACSA	Intermediate Advanced	5 – 6 years (Born 2019 - 2017)	Female/Male	Tiny	4 - 36 dancers	Jazz, Hip Hop, Pom, Lyrical/Contemporary
Tiny	ACSA	IASF	5 – 6 years	Female/Male	IASF U6 Elite	6 - 15 dancers	Jazz, Hip Hop, Pom, Lyrical/Contemporary, High Kick
Tiny	ACSA	IASF	5 – 6 years	Female/Male	IASF U6 Premier	16 - 30 dancers	Jazz, Hip Hop, Pom, Lyrical/Contemporary, High Kick
Tiny	AASCF	Novice	6 years and under (Born 2017 or later)	Female/Male	Tiny Petite Novice	5 - 9 dancers	Jazz, Hip Hop, Pom, Lyrical/Contemporary
Tiny	AASCF	Novice	6 years and under (Born 2017 or later)	Female/Male	Tiny Small Novice	10 - 14 dancers	Jazz, Hip Hop, Pom, Lyrical/Contemporary
Tiny	AASCF	Novice	6 years and under (Born 2017 or later)	Female/Male	Tiny Large Novice	15 or more dancers	Jazz, Hip Hop, Pom, Lyrical/Contemporary
Tiny	AASCF	All Star	4 – 6 years (Born 2019 - 2017)	Female/Male	Tiny Petite	5 - 9 dancers	Jazz, Hip Hop, Pom, Lyrical/Contemporary
Tiny	AASCF	All Star	4 – 6 years (Born 2019 - 2017)	Female/Male	Tiny Small	10 - 14 dancers	Jazz, Hip Hop, Pom, Lyrical/Contemporary
Tiny	AASCF	All Star	4 – 6 years (Born 2019 - 2017)	Female/Male	Tiny Large	15 or more dancers	Jazz, Hip Hop, Pom, Lyrical/Contemporary
Tiny	Cheerbrandz		6 years and younger	Female/Male	Tiny	5 or more dancers	Jazz, Hip Hop, Pom, Lyrical/Contemporary
Mini	ACSA	Novice	9 and under (Born 2014 or later)	Female/Male	Mini Novice	4 - 36 dancers	Jazz, Hip Hop, Pom, Lyrical/Contemporary
Mini	ACSA	Intermediate, Advanced	5 – 9 years (Born 2018 - 2014)	Female/Male	Mini	4 - 36 dancers	Jazz, Hip Hop, Pom, Lyrical/Contemporary
Mini	ACSA	IASF	4 – 7 years	Female/Male	IASF U8 Elite	6 - 15 dancers	Jazz, Hip Hop, Pom, Lyrical/Contemporary, High Kick
Mini	ACSA	IASF	4 – 7 years	Female/Male	IASF U8 Premier	16 - 30 dancers	Jazz, Hip Hop, Pom, Lyrical/Contemporary, High Kick
Mini	AASCF	Novice	9 years and younger (Born 2014 or later)	Female/Male	Mini Petite Novice	5 - 9 dancers	Jazz, Hip Hop, Pom, Lyrical/Contemporary
Mini	AASCF	Novice	9 years and younger (Born 2014 or later)	Female/Male	Mini Small Novice	10 - 14 dancers	Jazz, Hip Hop, Pom, Lyrical/Contemporary
Mini	AASCF	Novice	9 years and younger (Born 2014 or later)	Female/Male	Mini Large Novice	15 or more dancers	Jazz, Hip Hop, Pom, Lyrical/Contemporary
Mini	AASCF	All Star	5 – 9 years (Born 2018 - 2014)	Female/Male	Mini Petite	5 - 9 dancers	Jazz, Hip Hop, Pom, Lyrical/Contemporary
Mini	AASCF	All Star	5 – 9 years (Born 2018 - 2014)	Female/Male	Mini Small	10 - 14 dancers	Jazz, Hip Hop, Pom, Lyrical/Contemporary
Mini	AASCF	All Star	5 – 9 years (Born 2018 - 2014)	Female/Male	Mini Large	15 or more dancers	Jazz, Hip Hop, Pom, Lyrical/Contemporary
Mini	Cheerbrandz		9 years and younger	Female/Male	Mini	5 or more dancers	Jazz, Hip Hop, Pom, Lyrical/Contemporary
Youth	ACSA	Novice	12 years and under (Born 2011 or later)	Female/Male	Youth Novice	4 - 36 dancers	Jazz, Hip Hop, Pom, Lyrical/Contemporary
Youth	ACSA	Intermediate Advanced	6 – 12 years (Born 2017 - 2011)	Female/Male	Youth	4 - 36 dancers	Jazz, Hip Hop, Pom, Lyrical/Contemporary
Youth	ACSA	IASF	7 – 11 years old (Born 2016 - 2011)	Female/Male	IASF U12 Elite	6 - 15 dancers	Jazz, Hip Hop, Pom, Lyrical/Contemporary, High Kick
Youth	ACSA	IASF	7 – 11 years old (Born 2016 - 2011)	Female/Male	IASF U12 Premier	16 - 30 dancers	Jazz, Hip Hop, Pom, Lyrical/Contemporary, High Kick
Youth	AASCF	Novice	12 years and younger (Born 2011 or later)	Female/Male	Youth Petite Novice	5 - 9 dancers	Jazz, Hip Hop, Pom, Lyrical/Contemporary
Youth	AASCF	Novice	12 years and younger (Born 2011 or later)	Female/Male	Youth Small Novice	10 - 14 dancers	Jazz, Hip Hop, Pom, Lyrical/Contemporary
Youth	AASCF	Novice	12 years and younger (Born 2011 or later)	Female/Male	Youth Large Novice	15 or more dancers	Jazz, Hip Hop, Pom, Lyrical/Contemporary
Youth	AASCF	All Star	6 – 12 years (Born 2017 - 2011)	Female/Male	Youth Petite	5 - 9 dancers	Jazz, Hip Hop, Pom, Lyrical/Contemporary
Youth	AASCF	All Star	6 – 12 years (Born 2017 - 2011)	Female/Male	Youth Small	10 - 14 dancers	Jazz, Hip Hop, Pom, Lyrical/Contemporary
Youth	AASCF	All Star	6 – 12 years (Born 2017 - 2011)	Female/Male	Youth Large	15 or more dancers	Jazz, Hip Hop, Pom, Lyrical/Contemporary
Youth	AASCF	All Star	6 – 12 years (Born 2017 - 2011)	Female/Male	Youth Dance Doubles	2 dancers	Jazz, Hip Hop, Pom, Lyrical/Contemporary
Youth	AASCF	IASF	7 – 11 years old (Born 2016 - 2011)	Female/Male	IASF U12 Large	6 - 30 dancers	Jazz, Hip Hop, Pom, Lyrical/Contemporary
Youth	Cheerbrandz		12 years and younger	Female/Male	Youth	5 or more dancers	Jazz, Hip Hop, Pom, Lyrical/Contemporary
Junior	ACSA	Novice Intermediate Advanced	8 – 15 years (Born 2015 - 2018)	Female/Male	Junior	4 - 36 dancers	Jazz, Hip Hop, Pom, Lyrical/Contemporary, High Kick
Junior	ACSA	IASF	11 – 15 years	Female/Male	IASF U16 Elite	6 - 15 dancers	Jazz, Hip Hop, Pom, Lyrical/Contemporary, High Kick
Junior	ACSA	IASF	11 – 15 years	Female/Male	IASF U16 Premier	16 - 30 dancers	Jazz, Hip Hop, Pom, Lyrical/Contemporary, High Kick
Junior	AASCF	Novice	15 years and younger (Born 2008 or earlier)	Female/Male	Junior Petite Novice	5 - 9 dancers	Jazz, Hip Hop, Pom, Lyrical/Contemporary
Junior	AASCF	Novice	15 years and younger (Born 2008 or earlier)	Female/Male	Junior Small Novice	10 - 14 dancers	Jazz, Hip Hop, Pom, Lyrical/Contemporary
Junior	AASCF	Novice	15 years and younger (Born 2008 or earlier)	Female/Male	Junior Large Novice	15 or more dancers	Jazz, Hip Hop, Pom, Lyrical/Contemporary
Junior	AASCF	All Star	8 – 15 years (Born 2015 - 2008)	Female/Male	Junior Petite	5 - 9 dancers	Jazz, Hip Hop, Pom, Lyrical/Contemporary
Junior	AASCF	All Star	8 – 15 years (Born 2015 - 2008)	Female/Male	Junior Small	10 - 14 dancers	Jazz, Hip Hop, Pom, Lyrical/Contemporary
Junior	AASCF	All Star	8 – 15 years (Born 2015 - 2008)	Female/Male	Junior Large	15 or more dancers	Jazz, Hip Hop, Pom, Lyrical/Contemporary
Junior	AASCF	All Star	8 – 15 years (Born 2015 - 2008)	Female/Male	Junior Dance Doubles	2 dancers	Jazz, Hip Hop, Pom, Lyrical/Contemporary
Junior	AASCF	IASF	11 – 15 years (Born 2012 - 2007)	Female/Male	IASF U16 Large	6 - 30 athletes	Jazz, Hip Hop, Pom, Lyrical/Contemporary, High Kick
Junior	Cheerbrandz		14 years and younger	Female/Male	Junior Dance Doubles	2 dancers	Jazz, Hip Hop, Pom, Lyrical/Contemporary
Junior	Cheerbrandz		15 years and younger	Female/Male	Junior	5 or more dancers	Jazz, Hip Hop, Pom, Lyrical/Contemporary
Senior	ACSA	Novice, Intermediate, Advanced	11 – 18 years (Born 2012 - 2005)	Female/Male	Senior	4 - 36 dancers	Jazz, Hip Hop, Pom, Lyrical/Contemporary, High Kick
Senior	ACSA	IASF	13 – 17 years	Female/Male	IASF U18 Elite	6 - 15 dancers	Jazz, Hip Hop, Pom, Lyrical/Contemporary, High Kick
Senior	ACSA	IASF	13 – 17 years	Female/Male	IASF U18 Premier	16 - 30 dancers	Jazz, Hip Hop, Pom, Lyrical/Contemporary, High Kick
Senior	AASCF	Novice	18 years and younger (Born 2005 or earlier)	Female/Male	Senior Petite Novice	5 - 9 dancers	Jazz, Hip Hop, Pom, Lyrical/Contemporary
Senior	AASCF	Novice	18 years and younger (Born 2005 or earlier)	Female/Male	Senior Small Novice	10 - 14 dancers	Jazz, Hip Hop, Pom, Lyrical/Contemporary
Senior	AASCF	Novice	18 years and younger (Born 2005 or earlier)	Female/Male	Senior Large Novice	15 or more dancers	Jazz, Hip Hop, Pom, Lyrical/Contemporary
Senior	AASCF	All Star	11 – 18 years (Born 2012 - 2005)	Female/Male	Senior Petite	5 - 9 dancers	Jazz, Hip Hop, Pom, Lyrical/Contemporary
Senior	AASCF	All Star	11 – 18 years (Born 2012 - 2005)	Female/Male	Senior Small	10 - 14 dancers	Jazz, Hip Hop, Pom, Lyrical/Contemporary
Senior	AASCF	All Star	11 – 18 years (Born 2012 - 2005)	Female/Male	Senior Large	15 or more dancers	Jazz, Hip Hop, Pom, Lyrical/Contemporary
Senior	AASCF	All Star	11 – 18 years (Born 2012 - 2005)	Female/Male	Senior Dance Doubles	2 dancers	Jazz, Hip Hop, Pom, Lyrical/Contemporary
Senior	AASCF	USASF	12 – 18 years	Female/Male	USASF Senior Small	4 - 14 dancers	Jazz, Hip Hop, Pom, Lyrical/Contemporary, High Kick
Senior	AASCF	USASF	12 – 18 years	Female/Male	USASF Senior Large	15+ dancers	Jazz, Hip Hop, Pom, Lyrical/Contemporary, High Kick
Senior	Cheerbrandz		18 years and younger	Female/Male	Senior	5 or more dancers	Jazz, Hip Hop, Pom, Lyrical/Contemporary
Senior	Cheerbrandz		11 – 18 years	Female/Male	Open Dance Doubles	2 dancers	Jazz, Hip Hop, Pom, Lyrical/Contemporary
Open	ACSA	Novice, Intermediate, Advanced	14 years and older (2009 or earlier)	All Girl	Open AG	4 - 36 athletes	Jazz, Hip Hop, Pom, Lyrical/Contemporary, High Kick
Open	ACSA	Novice, Intermediate, Advanced	14 years and older (2009 or earlier)	Coed	Open Coed	4 - 36 athletes 1 or more males	Jazz, Hip Hop, Pom, Lyrical/Contemporary, High Kick
Open	ACSA	IASF	15 years and older	Female/Male	IASF Open Elite	6 - 15 dancers	Jazz, Hip Hop, Pom, Lyrical/Contemporary, High Kick
Open	ACSA	IASF	15 years and older	Female/Male	IASF Open Premier	16 - 30 dancers	Jazz, Hip Hop, Pom, Lyrical/Contemporary, High Kick
Open	AASCF	Novice	14 years and older (2009 or earlier)	Female/Male	Open Petite Novice	5 - 9 dancers	Jazz, Hip Hop, Pom, Lyrical/Contemporary
Open	AASCF	Novice	14 years and older (2009 or earlier)	Female/Male	Open Small Novice	10 - 14 dancers	Jazz, Hip Hop, Pom, Lyrical/Contemporary
Open	AASCF	Novice	14 years and older (2009 or earlier)	Female/Male	Open Large Novice	15 or more dancers	Jazz, Hip Hop, Pom, Lyrical/Contemporary
Open	AASCF	All Star	14 years and older (2009 or earlier)	All Girl	Open Petite AG	5 - 9 dancers	Jazz, Hip Hop, Pom, Lyrical/Contemporary
Open	AASCF	All Star	14 years and older (2009 or earlier)	All Girl	Open Small AG	10 - 14 dancers	Jazz, Hip Hop, Pom, Lyrical/Contemporary
Open	AASCF	All Star	14 years and older (2009 or earlier)	All Girl	Open Large AG	15 or more dancers	Jazz, Hip Hop, Pom, Lyrical/Contemporary
Open	AASCF	All Star	14 years and older (2009 or earlier)	Coed	Open Petite Coed	5 - 9 dancers	Jazz, Hip Hop, Pom, Lyrical/Contemporary
Open	AASCF	All Star	14 years and older (2009 or earlier)	Coed	Open Small Coed	10 - 14 dancers	Jazz, Hip Hop, Pom, Lyrical/Contemporary
Open	AASCF	All Star	14 years and older (2009 or earlier)	Coed	Open Large Coed	15 or more dancers	Jazz, Hip Hop, Pom, Lyrical/Contemporary
Open	AASCF	All Star	14 years and older (2009 or earlier)	Female/Male	Open Dance Doubles	2 dancers	Jazz, Hip Hop, Pom, Lyrical/Contemporary
Open	AASCF	IASF	15 years and older (Born 2008 or earlier)	All Girl	IASF Open AG	6 - 30 athletes	Jazz, Hip Hop, Pom, Lyrical/Contemporary, High Kick
Open	AASCF	IASF	15 years and older (Born 2008 or earlier)	Coed	IASF Open Coed	6 - 30 athletes 1 or more males	Jazz, Hip Hop, Pom, Lyrical/Contemporary, High Kick
Open	Cheerbrandz		14 years and older	Female/Male	Open	5 or more dancers	Jazz, Hip Hop, Pom, Lyrical/Contemporary
Open	Cheerbrandz		15 years and older	Female/Male	Open Dance Doubles	2 dancers	Jazz, Hip Hop, Pom, Lyrical/Contemporary
Adult	ACSA	Open	18 years or older (Born 2005 or earlier)	Female/Male	Adult	n/a	Hip Hop, Pom
Adult	AASCF	Open	21 years or older (Born 2002 or earlier)	Female/Male	Adult	5 - 30 dancers	Hip Hop, Pom
DanceABILITY	ACSA	DanceABILITY	All Ages	Female/Male	DanceABILITY Independent	Unlimited	Dance
DanceABILITY	ACSA	DanceABILITY	All Ages	Female/Male	DanceABILITY Unified	Unlimited	Dance
DanceABILITY	AASCF	DanceABILITY	All Ages	Female/Male	DanceABILITY Independent	Unlimited	Hip Hop, Pom, Jazz, Lyrical/Contemporary
DanceABILITY	AASCF	DanceABILITY	All Ages	Female/Male	DanceABILITY Unified	Unlimited	Hip Hop, Pom, Jazz, Lyrical/Contemporary
DanceABILITY	AASCF	DanceABILITY	All Ages	Female/Male	DanceABILITY Dance Doubles	2 dancers	Jazz, Hip Hop, Pom
Scholastic: Primary School	ACSA	Scholastic	Foundation to Grade 6	Female/Male	Scholastic Primary School	4 - 36 dancers	Jazz, Hip Hop, Pom
Scholastic: Primary School	AASCF	Scholastic	Foundation to Grade 6	Female/Male	Scholastic Primary School Petite	5 - 9 dancers	Jazz, Hip Hop, Pom, Lyrical/Contemporary
Scholastic: Primary School	AASCF	Scholastic	Foundation to Grade 6	Female/Male	Scholastic Primary School Small	10 - 14 dancers	Jazz, Hip Hop, Pom, Lyrical/Contemporary
Scholastic: Primary School	AASCF	Scholastic	Foundation to Grade 6	Female/Male	Scholastic Primary School Large	15 or more dancers	Jazz, Hip Hop, Pom, Lyrical/Contemporary
Scholastic: High School	ACSA	Scholastic	Grade 7 - 12	Female/Male	Scholastic: High School	4 - 36 dancers	Jazz, Hip Hop, Pom
Scholastic: High School	AASCF	Scholastic	Grade 7 - 12	Female/Male	Scholastic: High School Petite	5 - 9 dancers	Jazz, Hip Hop, Pom, Lyrical/Contemporary
Scholastic: High School	AASCF	Scholastic	Grade 7 - 12	Female/Male	Scholastic: High School Small	10 - 14 dancers	Jazz, Hip Hop, Pom, Lyrical/Contemporary
Scholastic: High School	AASCF	Scholastic	Grade 7 - 12	Female/Male	Scholastic: High School Large	15 or more dancers	Jazz, Hip Hop, Pom, Lyrical/Contemporary
Scholastic: University	ACSA	Scholastic	Registered University Student	Female/Male	Scholastic: University Small	5 - 16 dancers	Jazz, Hip Hop, Pom
Scholastic: University	ACSA	Scholastic	Registered University Student	Female/Male	Scholastic: University Large	5 - 24 dancers	Lyrical/Contemporary
Scholastic: University	ACSA	Scholastic	Registered University Student	Female/Male	Scholastic: University Large	16 - 20 dancers	Hip Hop, Pom
Scholastic: University	ACSA	Scholastic	Registered University Student	Female/Male	Scholastic: University Large	17 - 20 dancers	Jazz
Scholastic: University	ACSA	Scholastic	Registered University Student	Female/Male	Scholastic: University Dance Doubles	2 dancers	Jazz, Hip Hop, Pom
Scholastic: University	ACSA	Scholastic	17 years and older	Female/Male	Open University	n/a	Jazz, Hip Hop, Pom, Lyrical/Contemporary
Scholastic: University	AASCF	Scholastic	Registered University Student	Female/Male	Scholastic: University Small	5 - 16 dancers	Jazz, Hip Hop, Pom
Scholastic: University	AASCF	Scholastic	Registered University Student	Female/Male	Scholastic: University Large	5 - 24 dancers	Lyrical/Contemporary
Scholastic: University	AASCF	Scholastic	Registered University Student	Female/Male	Scholastic: University Large	16 - 20 dancers	Hip Hop, Pom
Scholastic: University	AASCF	Scholastic	Registered University Student	Female/Male	Scholastic: University Large	17 - 20 dancers	Jazz
Scholastic: University	AASCF	Scholastic	Registered University Student	Female/Male	Scholastic: University Dance Doubles	2 dancers	Jazz, Hip Hop, Pom

=== Scoring ===
The scoring system is broken into four major categories:

- Technical execution - 30%
  - Style execution - 10 points
  - Movement technique execution - 10 points
  - Skill technique execution - 10 points
- Group execution - 30%
  - Synchronisation and timing with music - 10 points
  - Uniformity of movement - 10 points
  - Spacing - 10 points
- Choreography - 30%
  - Musicality - 10 points
  - Routine staging and visual effects - 10 points
  - Complexity of movement - 10 points (capped at a maximum of 7.5 points for novice teams)
- Overall effect - 10%
  - Communication, projection, audience appeal, appropriateness - 10 points

The routines are scored and positioned by the judges on a sliding scale, that translates to scores equating to the following:

- Skill not yet established - 5 - 6 points
- Average - 6 - 7 points
- Good - 7 - 8 points
- Excellent - 8 - 9 points
- Outstanding - 9 - 10 points

=== Semi-Competitive Program ===
To match the CheerStars semi-competitive program, a DanceStars semi competitive program is also run alongside it by the same event producers at CheerCon and Aussie Gold events. The goal of this program is to bridge the gap between recreational and allstar dance, providing an opportunity for gyms, coaches and athletes to participate in competitions without the requirements of a novice or all star routine in terms of difficulty or skills. The focus is placed on execution and skill building over difficulty, allowing athletes to train to be clean and precise and encouraging them to perfect their skills before moving forward.

DanceStars athletes are allowed to crossover into novice teams, but are not allowed to compete at any higher level, and the teams are not eligible for highest scoring team awards. A minimum of 4 athletes is required for a DanceStars team, with a maximum of 38. If there are less than 3 teams entered in a DanceStars division at a competition, the event producer has the right to combine divisions within the same dance style, as long as it does not result in a gym having two teams in the same division i.e. mini/youth jazz. Routines are limited to 2 minutes and 15 seconds, with no minimum time requirement, and the program providing free premixed options for pom routines of 1 minute 30 seconds or 2 minutes in length.

The minimum age requirement is 3 years old, with no minimum age requirement being enforced on any age division at senior or below past that standard, creating the following age grid:

DanceStars Age Grid
Division	Age	Birth Years	Dance Genres
Tiny	3 – 6 years	2020 - 2017	Jazz, Hip Hop, Pom, Lyrical/Contemporary, High Kick
Mini	9 and under	2020 - 2014	Jazz, Hip Hop, Pom, Lyrical/Contemporary, High Kick
Youth	12 and under	2020 - 2011	Jazz, Hip Hop, Pom, Lyrical/Contemporary, High Kick
Junior	15 and under	2020 - 2008	Jazz, Hip Hop, Pom, Lyrical/Contemporary, High Kick
Senior	18 and under	2020 - 2005	Jazz, Hip Hop, Pom, Lyrical/Contemporary, High Kick
Open	14 and over	2009 and earlier	Jazz, Hip Hop, Pom, Lyrical/Contemporary, High Kick
Adult	22 and over	2001 or earlier	Jazz, Hip Hop, Pom, Lyrical/Contemporary, High Kick

=== DanceABILITY ===
DanceABILITY exists as the performance cheer/all star dance equivalent of the CheerABILITY division. Like CheerABILITY, the division offers two main structures: independent and unified. In the independent structure, 100% of the team is made up of adaptive ability athletes, allowing them to compete and showcase their skill and talent. Within the unified structure, no more than 75% of the team can be made up of non-adaptive ability athletes, and combines both abled and disabled athletes in a way that highlights the disabled athletes while fostering inclusivity and teamwork. Athletes without disabilities are required to wear distinctive and identifiable 3 inch arm bands on both arms.

Additionally, assistants are allowed in both structures to provide support to the disabled athletes. Assistants may provide one on one support or group support; however, they are not considered athletes on the team and do not contribute to the scorecard. Their role is to act as extra safety spotters or give directions via prompting from off the floor or side of the floor while not impairing the judges' view. Assistants must be registered for the event and dressed in all black.

Within DanceABILITY, athletes can compete within any offered dance genre including jazz, hip hop, pom, lyrical/contemporary and kick.

To be eligible to participate within this division, athletes must meet impairment eligibility criteria based on the Paralympics' impairment classifications, which include:

- Impaired muscle power
- Impaired passive range of movement
- Limb deficiency
- Leg length difference
- Short stature
- Hypertonia
- Ataxia
- Athetosis
- Visual impairment
- Intellectual impairment (including Fragile X Syndrome, Down Syndrome, Autism Spectrum Disorders, Foetal Alcohol Syndrome, Apert Syndrome)
- Hearing impairment

=== University Dance/Performance Cheer ===
University performance cheer/dance teams are often formed as part of university cheerleading clubs, made by student clubs around Australia. These teams usually compete at all-star cheer and dance events around the country within a specific university division with its own modified rules. To participate in a university team, students must hold current ID cards from the university, ensuring that the team is made entirely of university students from that university. In the event that a team contains any athletes who are not a student at that university (whether that be a non-student, alumni or student from another university), the team are required to compete in the open all-star division. This is to help ensure that the university division maintains the spirit of being representative of each university. In addition to all-star competitions, university dance teams also have the opportunity to compete at UniSport Nationals, an annual event that allows universities to compete head-to-head in a range of university-offered sports.

Student athletes are restricted from competing twice in the same university style if their university club offers more than one team in each style, with crossovers between open university dance teams and all-star dance teams not being permitted. University dance routines have a maximum of 2 minutes, with open university dance teams having a maximum of 2 minutes and 15 seconds.

A number of competitions offer the option of competing doubles routines for university clubs, which have a maximum of 1 minute and 30 seconds.

== Australian Event producers ==
There are a variety of cheer competitions and events held in Australia by event producers between March and November each year, in line with the Australian school year.

=== All Things Cheer & Dance Australia ===
All Things Cheer & Dance Australia (ATC) are based in Western Australia, founded in 2013 and celebrating their 10th anniversary in 2023. It is currently own and operated by a group of industry leaders including Antonio Pino (Australian cheerleading industry consultant, judge and coach), Jameel Rayam (Varsity America ATCD U.S. director, Explosion Spiritwear CEO), Jibreel Rayam (IASF director) and Jesica Mckenzie (corporate marketing).

ATC are listed as an ACSA sanctioned event provider as of June 2023 and were listed as an ACSA founding member.

ATC are primarily focused on the West coast of Australia, holding their 2023 competitions, conventions and conferences across Western Australia and South Australia on a September to November schedule.

=== AUSCheer (Now Defunct) ===
AUSCheer was launched in 2009 as a program by Gymnastics Australia as their cheerleading focused branch. This initiative included a Nations Cup event series of 23 events around Australia, national camps with international instructors and an international tour to the USA including the COA Ultimate National Championships in Florida and the Aloha International Spirit Championships in Hawaii. The Gymnastics Australia cheerleading management committee used 2009 to focus on the launch and delivery of the AUSCheer program as well as the establishment of operational guidelines for cheerleading within mainstream gymnastics.

In 2010, Gymnastics Australia continued to host a range of cheerleading competitions around Australia under the AUSCheer brand, with the Nations Cup series having 27 events across the year. The Australian Grand Cheerleading Championship was held in Melbourne this year, with a 25% increase in competitors across the cheer, dance, stunt and tumble categories.

However, moving into 2011, Gymnastics Australia announced a scaled back operational plan for the AUSCheer brand, choosing to redirect their resources into the ongoing review of cheerleading for 2012. Despite this, their cheerleading national championship event continued to grow, seeing a total of 1200 athletes participating in 2011.

During 2012, the AUSCheer competitions continued; however, on a scaled-back level compared with previous years. Competitions would be held largely in August through to mid-September, with one outlying event held in early June in South Australia. During the 2012 competition year, AusCheer also included CheerCon events as part of their competition event calendar, including the CheerCon Classic events in NSW and Queensland as AUSCheer event rounds. 2012 would mark the final year of competitions from AUSCheer, with their website not updated moving forward into 2013 and beyond.

=== Aussie Gold Cheer & Dance ===
Aussie Gold was founded in 2011 by Nerine Cooper, after she left Gymnastics Australia as their cheerleading program managing director.

Originally starting off as one event held in July 2011 at the Gold Coast Convention Centre, Aussie Gold has since grown to include a number of state championships in Western Australia, South Australia, Victoria and Queensland in an August to November competition schedule year that offer bids to their international championships event, as well as their bid-only internationals event that offers further bids to the Cheerleading and Dance Worlds as well as Cheerleading and Dance Summit. In their October 2023 social media announcement for their 2024 event dates, Aussie Gold revealed the addition of a New South Wales based competition as well as the introduction of a Nationals end of year event.

Aussie Gold competitions are notable for historically not being based solely in major cities, having offered competition opportunities in the Queensland regional hubs of Mackay and Townsville, as well as offering a competition in Western Australia which many event producers do not.

In 2023, Aussie Gold competitions no longer offered group stunt or assisted partner stunt categories, and only offered partner stunt in senior levels 5-6 and open levels 5–7.

Aussie Gold Cheer & Dance is one of the event producers that offers Cheerstars divisions, allowing teams to participate in a modified version of levels 1 to 3 with the focus being on perfection of skills over difficulty as well as the performance cheer equivalent DanceStars program.

Aussie Gold was one of the four event producers who were part of the Australian Independent Event Producers (AIEP) group, as well as being a founding member of the Australian Cheer Sport Alliance.

=== Australian All Star Cheerleading Federation (AASCF) ===
The Australian All Star Cheerleading Federation (AASCF) was founded in April 2005 by Rosemary Sims and Stephen James. AASCF were the first event producer in Australia to be affiliated with USASF and IASF, offering bids to IASF Worlds as part of their annual national championship. Historically, they have also offered bids to other American-based international competitions at different events throughout the year, such as offering Summit bids as part of their Battle events

AASCF run several competitions across the country in a June to November season format, including Winterfest, Battle, States, Spring Carnival and Nationals.

Previously AASCF was known for offering a competition similar to Summit in the U.S., in which the overall highest-scoring team in each level of cheer and division of dance at earlier competitions throughout the year received a bid to compete as one of the "chosen few" to be the "best of the best" in Australia.

However, the Pinnacle event was phased out in 2023 in favour of "The Road to IASF Worlds". The Road to IASF Worlds event is a "day 2" competition held directly after AASCF's Nationals events and is part of the process of a team competing for a 2024 Cheerleading Worlds bid.

AASCF holds Australia's largest national cheerleading and dance championship annually, which rotates location between the Gold Coast (Queensland) and Melbourne (Victoria) currently. As of 2026, AASCF Nationals will be held in the Gold Coast (Queensland) each year.

AASCF were a founding member of the Australian Cheer Sport Alliance, however is no longer a listed sanctioned event provider as of mid-2023.

=== Australian Cheer Elite (ACE) (Defunct) ===
Australian Cheer Elite (ACE) was owned by Derrick and Kassandra Turner (owners of East Coast Allstars) and were founding members of the Australian Cheer Sport Alliance. They remained actively listed as ACSA sanctioned event producers until mid-2023 however the company do not appear to have run an event since 2019.

=== Cheer & Dance Fest ===
Cheer and Dance Fest is a newly launching non-competition event. The first event is currently planned to be held in Brisbane and Sydney during October 2024 by Victoria Williamson of JVE Productions.

This event was designed to fill a gap in the cheer and dance community, where athletes and coaches from all gyms, levels and abilities could learn from leading coaches and instructors without the pressure of competition. It is planned to be a full day workshop event, ended with an evening gala in which all athletes, parents and VIP guests can celebrate all things cheer and dance.

Planned VIP instructors for the 2024 event, announced during October 2023, are Victoria Baldesarra, Anthony and Sawyer Damiani, and Jada Wooten.

=== Cheer Unlimited Australia (Defunct) ===
Cheer Unlimited Australia (CUA) was founded in 2011 by Briony Keenan, a former member of the Gymnastics Australia National Cheerleading Committee and her sister, Jakky.

At its peak, CUA ran competitions in Western Australia, South Australia and Queensland as part of a championship series.

Unfortunately due to the impact of COVID-19 on the cheer industry, Jakky and Briony published a statement via the Cheer Unlimited Australia Instagram and Facebook accounts in May 2021 that the company would no longer be holding cheer and dance competitions for the foreseeable future.

CUA was one of the four members of the now disbanded Australian Independent Event Producers (AIEP), with CUA founder Bri contributing to the development of the Australian Independent Scoring System (AISS) that the group utilised. CUA then went on to become a founding member of the Australian Cheer Sport Alliance.

=== CheerBrandz ===
Cheerbrandz is a New Zealand-based event producer and apparel provider, founded in 2003.

While many of the Cheerbrandz events are based in New Zealand, the company branched into Australia in 2013, beginning by hosting the Australasian Majors in Brisbane.

Since that point they have continued to expand in the Australian market, introducing Olympia and a Nationals event in 2017 and Eutopia in 2018. In 2021, in response to the COVID-19 pandemic restrictions, Cheerbrandz introduced a Super Nationals competition with event hubs in local areas to allow teams to compete that were then ranked against each other at all event hubs. This event continues in 2023, despite COVID-19 restrictions no longer restricting travel.

Cheerbrandz hosted an April to November competition season in 2023 with events in Auckland, Sydney and Brisbane that offered both in person and virtual entry to all events.

CheerBrandz is not an ACSA sanctioned event provider and as such does not state that they follow any of the ACSA policies and guidelines. Cheerbrandz events currently follow IASF 2021-2023 rules. Despite the lack of connection to ACSA, their age grid included within their information pack is identical, as is their scoring rubric and their scoring information booklet still contain references to ACSA throughout.

=== CheerCon ===
CheerCon was founded in 2008 by the husband and wife team of Alex and Danielle Jimenez, expanding into the competition space in 2011. Cheercon currently offers not only a series of cheerleading competitions, but also workshops and camps for both athletes as well as gym owners and coaches, competition uniforms, training gear, team apparel and accessories, travel packages, immigration and visa packages for international coaches and judges and hiring of cheer and dance competition flooring.

CheerCon's current competition calendar includes competitions in New South Wales, far north Queensland, Victoria, South Australia and Western Australia, held across a June to December competition year. In 2023, CheerCon introduced a new event to their event series titled "Best of the Best Nationals", held at ICC Sydney Darling Harbour in the first weekend of December, offering an end-of-year nationals alternative to AASCF's Nationals event.

Past events have included locations such as ACT and Geelong, providing regional access to cheer competitions in earlier years. CheerCon were also included as part of the AUSCheer event schedule in past years when AusCheer were still operating.

CheerCon have been partnered with Nfinity since 2020, to host the Australian leg of the Nfinity Champions League event series. This event is currently held in Newcastle, NSW in late October.

CheerCon has also been the host of the Battle at the Beaches competition, Australia's first outdoor cheer competition held at Manly, NSW, since 2018. Battle at the Beaches was first held in 2016 as an independent event that attracted 1500 athletes, and again as an independent event in 2017, before CheerCon began hosting the event from 2018 onwards. The 2020 event was cancelled due to COVID restrictions, as was the 2021 event; however, the 2023 CheerCon event information pack promises a return for Battle at the Beaches for their 2024 event schedule.

CheerCon is one of the event producers that offers Cheerstars and DanceStars divisions, allowing teams to participate in a modified version of cheer levels 1 to 3 and all dance styles with the focus being on perfection of skills over difficulty.

CheerCon was one of the original four event producers who were part of the Australian Independent Event Producers (AIEP) group. However, this group has not seen any updates on their social media since 2017. CheerCon went on to become a founding member of the Australian Cheer Sport Alliance (ACSA) in 2017, and remain listed as an ACSA sanctioned event provider in 2023.

=== Dance and Cheer Events (DCE) ===
Dance and Cheer Events (DCE) was founded in 2008 by Lyn Parker, a member of the first Gymnastics Australia working committee for cheerleading in 2002 and chairperson of the cheerleading sport management committee by 2006.

When the event producer was first formed in 2008, DCE went by the name World Cup Cheerleading (WCC) and hosted a range of competitions across Queensland including regional locations such as Townsville, Rockhampton, Toowoomba and the Sunshine Coast as well as Brisbane based competitions. At the time, WCC held a partnership with Gymnastics Queensland to host all cheerleading competitions, clinics, camps and education programs within the state under the Gymnastics Australia banner, with the Gymnastics Queensland website redirecting those looking for cheerleading information to the organisation. This partnership differed from the approach of other states at the time, as Gymnastics Queensland was the only state not participating in the AUS Cheer program launched in 2008 by Gymnastics Australia.

While starting off being Queensland cheerleading based under the Gymnastics Australia partnership, it only took a year for WCC to rebrand to World Cup Cheer and Dance (WCCD) and expand their offerings not only nationwide, but international as they offered a competition in New Zealand.

The WCCD branding remained in place until WCCD was purchased in January 2017 by Coralie Bradshaw, the owner of Bradshaw Dance and Cheer studios, announcing the purchase and rebranding of the company as Dance and Cheer Events via a social media statement.

DCE holds a range of events from July to October each year in Queensland, New South Wales and Tasmania, offering international event bids to IASF Cheerleading Worlds, Summit and JAMZ Nationals Las Vegas.

DCE is not listed as an ACSA sanctioned event as of June 2023, following the IASF rules and utilising their own scoring system during the 2022 competition season.

=== The Golden Mile Championship (Defunct?) ===
The Golden Mile Championship was first announced on social media in 2019 with the intent of the first competition being held in Kalgoorlie, Western Australia, in 2020 which was cancelled due to COVID-19. They went on to hold their inaugural championship in 2021 and a follow up championship in 2022. They are currently listed as an ACSA sanctioned event in June 2023, however have no active social media presence or website outside of this.

=== Infinite Spirit All Stars ===
Infinite Spirit All Stars Cheer and Dance Championships was founded in 2005 by Tamara Manning as the FNQ Cheer and Dance Championships before a rebrand in 2016, which included an expansion of the event producer's offerings to include more regional areas of Australia.

Infinite Spirit All Stars events are focused on allowing access in regional areas for cheerleading competitions, holding events in Mackay, Brisbane, Hobart and Cairns in 2023.

From 2023 onwards, Infinite Spirit Allstars announced that they would no longer be splitting their cheer divisions by all girl and co-ed within the age groups, with traditional "co-ed" skills (partner stunting and dual based stunts) now counting towards the elite stunt section of the rubric regardless of the gender of the athlete performing them. Prior to 2023, Infinite Spirit All Stars had only split teams into co-ed and all girl divisions if deemed necessary on an event-by-event basis, with level 3 and above co-ed teams still being required to fulfil any co-ed stunt requirements even if the division was not split.

They also announced that they would not be adopting the ACSA image policy ban on midriff cheerleading uniforms that was brought in as of the beginning of the 2023 season.

While Infinite Spirit All Stars were a founding member of ACSA, the EP was no longer listed as a sanctioned event provider as of August 2023.

=== Spirit Industries Australia (Defunct) ===
Spirit Industries Australia (SIA) was founded in 2011, by Emma Slater. While there is evidence that SIA intended on holding its annual Winter Warm Up championships in 2022, the last active event held was their 2021 Winter Warmup. There is no public statements regarding their disbandment/closure available but it is assumed they are currently defunct.

Spirit Industries Australia was one of the four members of the now disbanded Australian Independent Event Producers (AIEP). They were also one of the founding members of the Australian Cheer Sport Alliance.

== Safeguarding Issues ==
Lawsuits continue to mount in the United States regarding abuse towards cheerleaders by coaches and gyms. As Australia's cheerleading industry is modelled after the United States, it is unsurprising that Australia has also begun to see allegations of abuse be raised in the Australian cheerleading community which have highlighted safeguarding gaps within the Australian cheer industry.

In April 2020, a female Australian cheerleading coach faced court accused of having sexually exploited one athlete she coached. In July 2020, she was charged with the alleged sexual abuse of three athletes, however by September of the same year, prosecutors were choosing to proceed with allegations involving 14 athletes in total between August 2015 and December 2017. The trial was delayed until February 2023 due to the impact that COVID-19 had on the courts backlog, at which time the coach pleaded not guilty. The charges include three counts of maintaining an unlawful sexual relationship with a child, one aggravated count of indecent assault and three basic counts of indecent assault, with four of the alleged victims being just 12 years old, across more than 21 alleged incidents of abuse. This trial was still ongoing in August 2023 before Judge Joanna Fuller, in the absence of a jury, with the defendant's barrister suggesting that this was a collusion by the alleged victims "to ruin her [the accused]".

As of 29 September 2023, the coach was acquitted of all charges, with the judge concluding it was commonplace for athletes and coaches to "discuss sexual topics" and "touch each other, including on the breasts, which was done as "as a joke or in a light-hearted manner"." The judge further commented, "When that occurred it was done as a joke or something silly, and the athletes to whom she did this did not object but laughed about it. On the findings I have made, this was accepted behaviour between close female friends and fellow athletes of varying ages and part of sky-larking or humorous interactions that was commonplace at the club. In those circumstances I could not be satisfied beyond reasonable doubt that the touching occurred in circumstances of indecency."

While neither ACU nor ACSA existed as governing bodies during the time of the allegations, the sport remained under Gymnastics Australia governance and Australian All Star Cheer Sport Federation had provided both a child safe policy and template for a child safe code of conduct for clubs. While the judge may have ruled that this was not sexual assault, this behaviour remains a breach of both codes of conduct. The AASCF child safe policy defines child sexual abuse per the policy as including "inappropriate conversations of a sexual nature", "obscene language of a sexual nature", "suggest remarks or actions", "jokes of a sexual nature" and "unwarranted and inappropriate touching", which the judge acknowledged occurred within her judgement remarks.

Before the first appearance of this case in court in April 2020, only one of the two acting governing bodies of cheer in Australia who had formed in the recent years beforehand, Australian Cheer Union (ACU) held a member policy. Australian Cheer Sport Alliance (ACSA) lacked a member protection policy at the time. However, as previously mentioned, prior to the formation of both these bodies, Australian All Star Cheer Sport Federation had provided both a child safe policy and template for a child safe code of conduct for clubs to utilise, and the sport was still bound under Gymnastics Australia's governance and safeguarding policies until the end of 2018 when they stepped away from their governing body role.

In response to these events, ACSA created a member protection policy in July 2020 which was released in November 2020, outlining the responsibilities for athlete protection by coaches, gym owners and others working with athletes. This policy has not been publicly updated since its first release in November 2020 as of June 2023.

The Australian Cheer Union member policy policy was first released in November 2019, with the aim of creating a safe, fair and inclusive environment where everyone involved was aware of their key legal and ethical rights and responsibilities and standards of behaviour expected of them to eliminate discrimination, harassment, child abuse and other forms of inappropriate behaviour. However this policy has not been updated publicly since its initial release, with the original version being the current public version of this policy as of September 2023.

In contrast, ACSA released an update to their Safe Sport Guidelines for Children and Young People in October 2021 to members; however, this document was not publicly updated on their website until after June 2023. At the time of their website updating, they also publicly released their separate National Member Protection Policy, which was created in November 2022 and released in December 2022 to members. ACSA also strongly encourages their members to refer to external resources such as Play By The Rules, and familiarise themselves with this specific resource on their member protection documents page within their member portal, and requires both gyms and event providers to undertake an annual child safe self-assessment that includes a registered Child Safe Representative who has completed the Play By The Rules Child Safe course. It is of note that ACSA's own policy does not align with the standards outlined in this course.

As of September 2023, neither group's policy aligns with the safeguarding standard required of a National Sporting Organisation by Sport Australia under the Sport Integrity Australia National Integrity Framework - despite both organisations having applied for NSO status in late 2022.
