= Cea =

Cea or CEA may refer to:

== Businesses ==
- Cambridge Environmental Assessments, a company specializing in chemical risk assessment
- CEA Technologies, an Australian defence contractor
- China Eastern Airlines, based in Shanghai, People's Republic of China

== Government bodies or offices ==
- Central Electricity Authority, in charge of the electricity supply industry in England and Wales between 1954 and 1957
- Central Electricity Authority (India), an advisory organization to the Indian government
- Chief Economic Adviser to the Government of India
- China Earthquake Administration or Chinese Seismic Bureau
- Collectivité européenne d’Alsace (European Collectivity of Alsace), a territorial collectivity of France resulting from the merger of two former departments
- Council for Estate Agencies, a statutory board under the Ministry of National Development of Singapore
- Council of Economic Advisers, an agency within the Executive Office of the President of the United States

== Legislation ==
- Canada Elections Act
- Canada Evidence Act, an 1893 act of the Parliament of Canada that regulates the rules of evidence
- Chinese Exclusion Act, an 1882 law in the United States, barring the immigration of Chinese citizens
- Commodity Exchange Act, a piece of legislation regulating the sale of commodities in the United States

== Medicine ==
- Carcinoembryonic antigen, a tumor marker for colorectal cancer
- Carotid endarterectomy, a surgical procedure involving the carotid artery
- Central nucleus of the amygdala
- Collie eye anomaly, a congenital eye disease in dogs

== Organizations ==
- California Earthquake Authority, a privately funded, publicly managed organization that sells California earthquake insurance policies
- Canadian Economics Association, an academic association of Canadian economists
- Cheer Extreme All Stars, a cheerleading organization based in North Carolina
- Cinema Exhibitors' Association, the national trade association for cinema operators in the United Kingdom
- Colorado Education Association, a federation of labor unions
- Comité Européen des Assurances or Insurance Europe, an organization representing the European insurance and reinsurance industry
- Commissariat à l'énergie atomique et aux énergies alternatives, a French government-funded research organisation
- Commission on English Language Accreditation: Commission on English Language Program Accreditation, an American NGO accrediting English programs worldwide
- Consumer Electronics Association or Consumer Technology Association, a trade organization for the American consumer electronics industry
- Connecticut Education Association, a professional organization advocating for teachers and public school students
- Correctional Education Association, a non-profit professional association providing educational services in correctional settings

== Places ==
- Kos or Cea, an Aegean island of Greece
- Cea (river), a river in Spain
- Cea, León, a municipality in Spain

== Schools ==
- Centro de Estudios sobre América or Centre for American Studies, an academic institution in Havana, Cuba
- Centro de Educación Artística, an arts institute in Mexico City
- College of Engineering, Adoor, an engineering college at Adoor, Kerala

== Other uses ==
- Cea, a chalcid wasp genus
- Cea (surname)
- Certified Audio Engineer, a professional title regulated by the Society of Broadcast Engineers
- Communications-enabled application, a software application that depends on real-time networking capabilities
- Controlled-environment agriculture, a technology-based approach toward food production
- Cost-effectiveness analysis, an economic analysis sometimes used to evaluate medical treatments
- Cessna Aircraft Field's IATA airport code and FAA location identifier
- Cylindrical equal-area projection
- Lower Chehalis language's ISO 639-3 code
- Cambridge Electron Accelerator, electron synchrotron and electron-positron collider, Harvard University and MIT, Cambridge, MA, 1962–1974 (List of accelerators in particle physics)

== People with the given name ==
- Cea Sunrise Person (born 1969), Canadian writer and former model
- Cea Weaver, American urban planner and tenant organizer
