= List of cheerleaders =

This is a list of cheerleaders.

== Notable cheerleaders ==
Listed below are notable cheerleaders who have been instrumental within the sport.

=== Individual ===
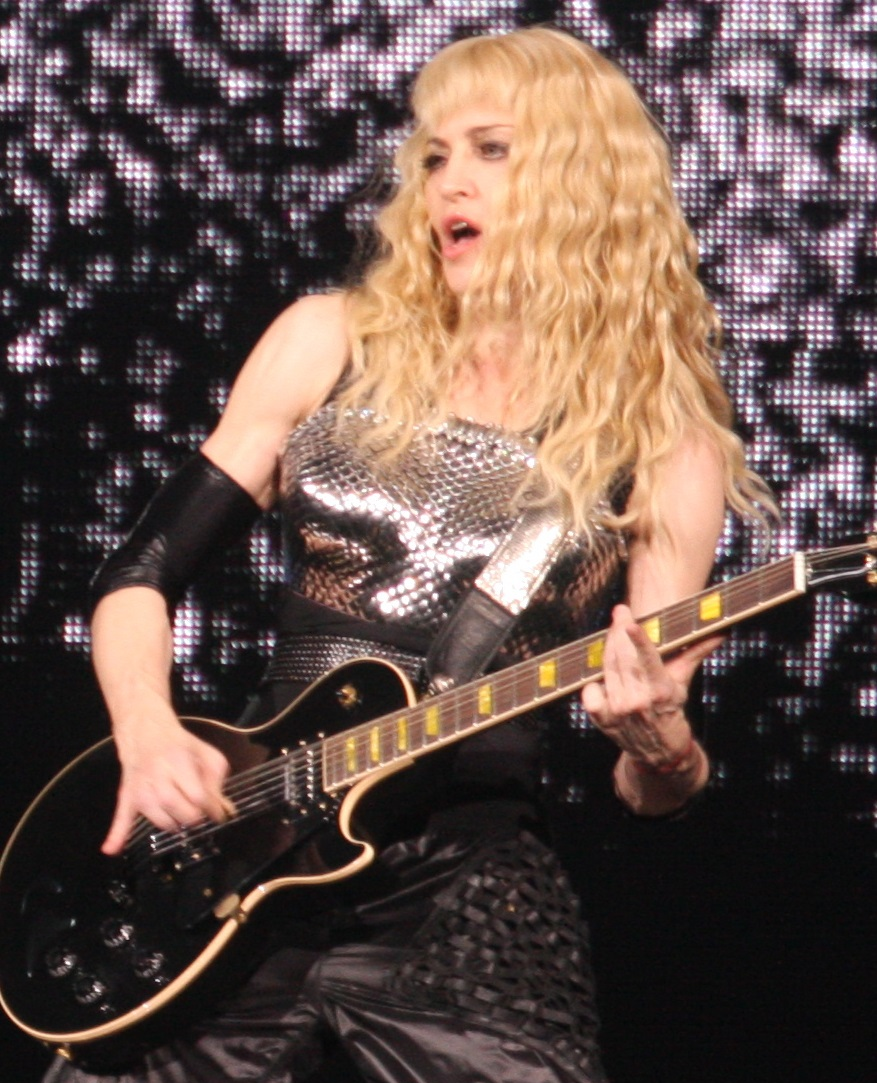
Pop star Madonna was a cheerleader at Rochester Adams High School

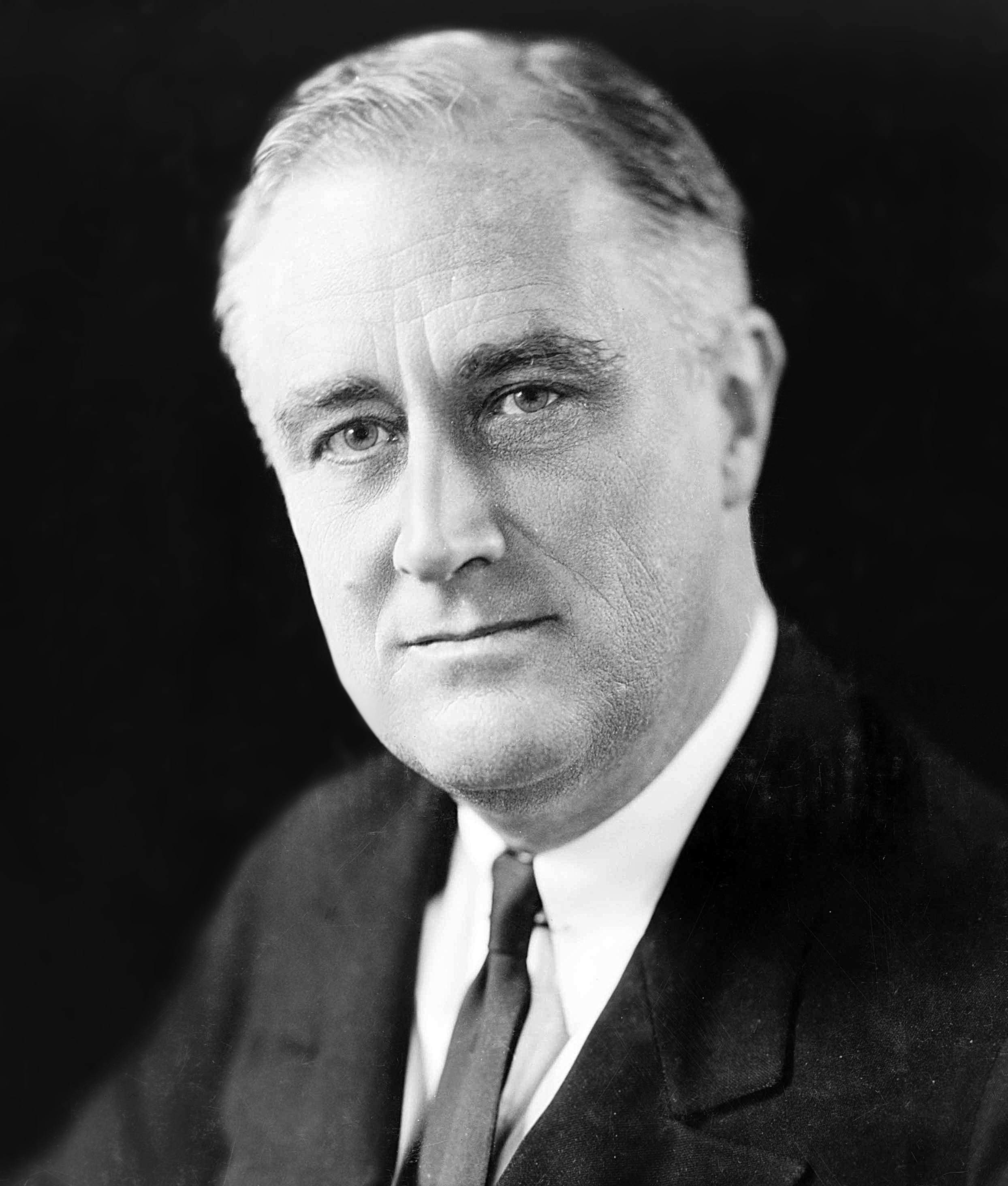
Former US President Franklin D. Roosevelt was a cheerleader at Harvard University

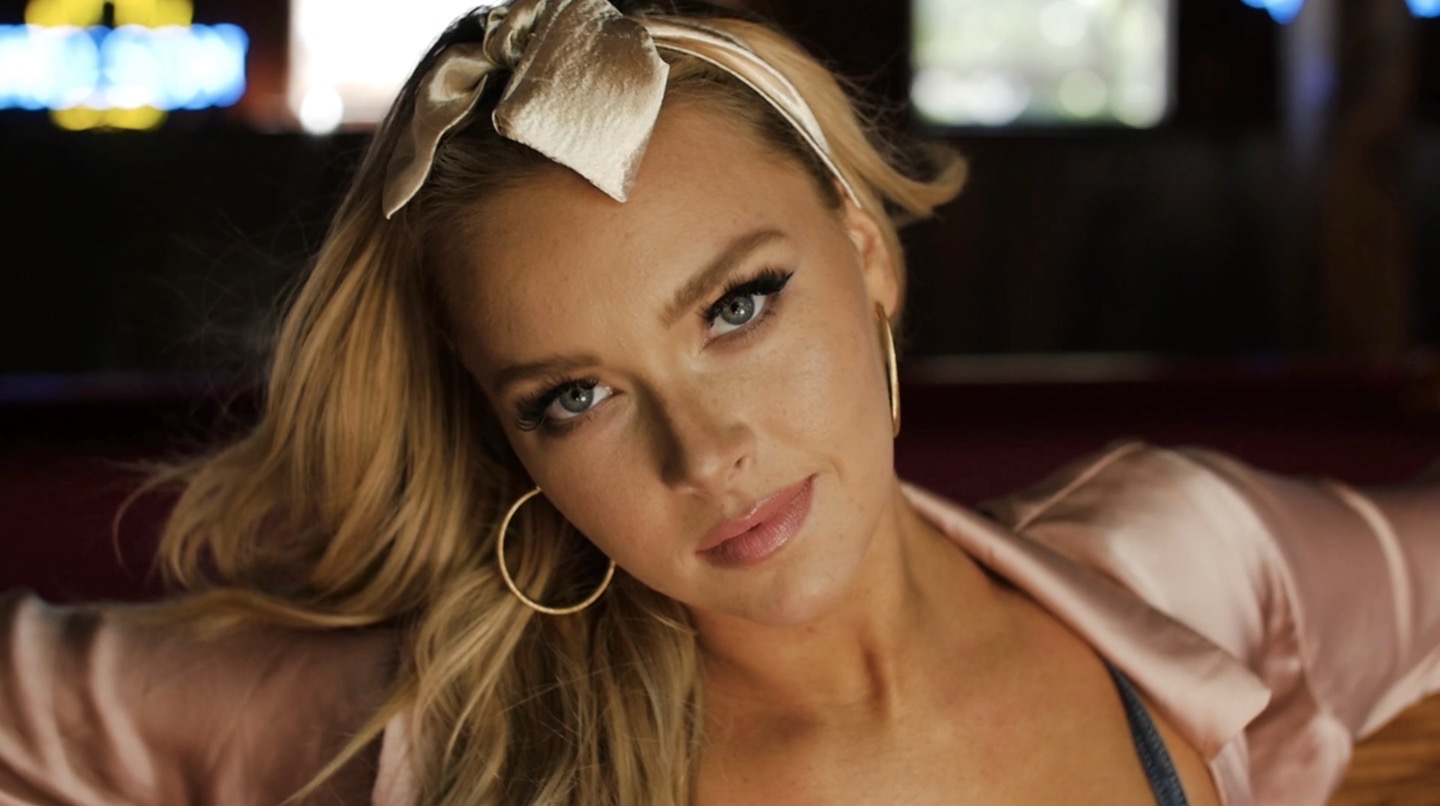
Sports Illustrated Swimsuit cover model Camille Kostek was a cheerleader for the New England Patriots

- Paula Abdul, Los Angeles Lakers, Van Nuys High School
- Christina Aguilera, North Allegheny Intermediate High School
- Toni Basil, Las Vegas High School
- Jill Belland, Calgary Stampeders
- Sandra Bullock, Washington-Lee High School
- Hilarie Burton, Park View High School
- George W. Bush, Phillips Academy
- Charisma Carpenter, San Diego Chargers
- Miley Cyrus
- Brooklyn Decker, David W. Butler High School
- Cameron Diaz, Long Beach Polytechnic High School
- Kirsten Dunst
- Dwight D. Eisenhower
- Shannon Elizabeth
- Jaime Espinal, University of Puerto Rico at Bayamón
- Maddie Gardner, Cheer Extreme Allstars, UNC Chapel Hill
- Jennie Garth, Sunburst Middle School
- Jenilee Harrison, Los Angeles Rams
- Teri Hatcher, San Francisco 49ers
- Jennifer Hawkins, Newcastle Knights
- Dylon Hoffpauir, LSU, Saints Cheer Krewe
- Brooke Hogan, Clearwater Central Catholic
- Kendall Jenner, Sierra Canyon School
- Kylie Jenner, Sierra Canyon School
- Arielle Kebbel, Winter Park High School
- Stacy Keibler, Baltimore Ravens
- Megyn Kelly
- Camille Kostek, New England Patriots Cheerleaders
- Ali Landry
- Jennifer Lawrence
- Justine Lindsay, Carolina Topcats
- Blake Lively, Burbank High School
- Eva Longoria, Roy Miller High School
- Madonna, Rochester Adams High School #69
- Steve Martin
- Karen McDougal, River Valley High School
- Mandy Moore, Pop Warner
- Rick Perry, Texas A&M University Yell Leader
- Kelly Ripa
- Mitt Romney, Cranbrook School
- Franklin D. Roosevelt, Harvard
- Noelle Salazar
- Jessica Simpson, Richardson North Junior High School
- Phyllis Smith, actress on The Office (American version), St Louis Cardinals football
- Aaron Spelling, Southern Methodist University
- Laura Vikmanis, Cincinnati BenGals
- Reese Witherspoon, Montgomery Bell Academy
- Renée Zellweger, Katy High School
- Snooki, Marlboro High School

=== Squads ===
- Dallas Cowboys Cheerleaders
- Cheer Extreme Allstars
- Hog's Breath Cafe Broncos Cheer Squad
- The Emeralds
- The Sapphires
- Cronulla Sharks Mermaids
- Gold Coast Hogs Breath Cafe Sirens
- Manly Seabirds
- Melbourne Storm Cheerleaders
- Newcastle Knights Cheerleaders
- North Queensland Cowgirls Spirit
- Parramatta Eels Cheerleaders
- Penrith Panthers Cheersquad
- St George-Illawarra Flames
- The Roosters Girls
- XXXX Angels
- Carolina Panthers Cheerleaders
- World Cup All Stars

== Fictional cheerleaders ==
=== Individual ===
- Claire Bennet (Hayden Panettiere) and Jackie Wilcox (Danielle Savre), from Heroes
- Boopsie, from the comic strip Doonesbury
- Grace Bowman (Megan Park) from the television series The Secret Life of the American Teenager
- Cordelia Chase (Charisma Carpenter) from Buffy the Vampire Slayer
- Quinn Fabray (Dianna Agron), Santana Lopez (Naya Rivera), Brittany Pierce (Heather Morris), Kitty Wilde (Becca Tobin), Madison McCarthy (Laura Dreyfuss). and Mason McCarthy (Billy Lewis Jr.); Kurt Hummel (Chris Colfer), Mercedes Jones (Amber Riley), Tina Cohen-Chang (Jenna Ushkowitz), and Blaine Anderson (Darren Criss) momentarily, from the musical television series Glee
- Melanie and Martina Grant, from the television game show Fun House
- Elena Gilbert (Nina Dobrev), Caroline Forbes (Candice King) and Bonnie Bennett (Kat Graham), from the CW television series The Vampire Diaries
- Rachel Green (Jennifer Aniston), from the NBC television series Friends
- Sandy Olsson (Olivia Newton-John) and Patty Simcox (Susan Buckner) from the 1978 film Grease
- Bailey Pickett (Debby Ryan) from the television series The Suite Life on Deck
- Kim Possible from the animated Disney Channel series of the same name.
- Alex Russo (Selena Gomez) from the television series Wizards of Waverly Place
- Juliet Starling (voiced by Tara Strong), protagonist of Lollipop Chainsaw
- Snoopy from Peanuts
- Buffy Summers (Sarah Michelle Gellar) from the television series Buffy the Vampire Slayer
- Haruhi Suzumiya, the title character of the Haruhi Suzumiya series is frequently shown in a cheerleader uniform.
- Lilly Truscott (Emily Osment), from the television series Hannah Montana
- Jessica Wakefield (Brittany Daniel), from the 1990s television series Sweet Valley High
- Lynda Van Der Klok (Kristina Klebe), from the 2007 film Halloween (in the earlier version of the film, she was not a cheerleader)
- Ariana Grande, Daniella Monet, Colleen Ballinger, Tayla Parx, Victoria Monét, and others in the music video for Grande's "thank u, next"

=== Squads ===
- Arborville High Hawkettes, including Meg Penny (Shawnee Smith) from the film The Blob
- Bayside High Tigerettes, from the television series Saved by the Bell, including: Kelly Kapowski (Tiffani Thiessen), Jessie Spano (Elizabeth Berkley), and Lisa Turtle (Lark Voorhies)
- California State College Cheerleaders, from Bring It On Again
- Central High Centaurettes, including Krista Wilson (Sarah Chalke), from the Moment of Truth movie Stand Against Fear
- Cheevers High School Chipmunks, including London Tipton (Brenda Song), Cody Martin (Cole Sprouse), Nia Moseby (Giovonnie Samuels), Jessica and Janice Ellis (Camilla and Rebecca Rosso), Barbara Brownstein (Sophie Oda), Dana (Daniella Monet), Haley (Tara Lynne Barr), and Leslie (Kaycee Stroh), from The Suite Life of Zack & Cody
- Cheer Extreme Allstars, including Ryan Cummings, internet meme
- CHS Cheerleaders from MADtv's High School Musical parody
- Clovis High Cheerleaders, including Justine Essex (Charlotte Ross) and Vicky Gilmore (Kimberly Hooper), from the film She Says She's Innocent (AKA Violation of Trust)
- Crenshaw Heights High Warriors Cheerleaders, including Camille and Jesse, from Bring It On: All or Nothing
- Dancers in Britney Spears' music video for "If U Seek Amy"
- Deering High Tornadoettes, including Amy Wright (real-life former cheerleader Paige Petersen), from Hang Time
- Degrassi Power Cheer, including Becky Baker (Sarah Fisher), Frankie Hollingsworth (Sara Waisglass), Zoë Rivas (Ana Golja), Shay Powers (Reiya Downs), Lola Pacini (Amanda Arcuri), and Jack Jones (Niamh Wilson), from Degrassi
- Degrassi Power Squad, including Paige Michalchuk (Lauren Collins), Hazel Aden (Andrea Lewis), Manny Santos (Cassie Steele), Darcy Edwards (Shenae Grimes), Chantay Black (Jajube Mandiela), Mia Jones (Nina Dobrev), Holly J. Sinclair (Charlotte Arnold), Anya MacPherson (Samantha Munro), Jenna Middleton (Jessica Tyler), Marisol Lewis (Shanice Banton), and Frankie Hollingsworth (Sara Waisglass), from Degrassi: The Next Generation
- Dillon High Pantherettes, including Lyla Garrity (Minka Kelly), from the television series Friday Night Lights
- East Compton High Clovers, including Isis (Gabrielle Union), from Bring It On
- East Lake High School Cheerleaders Craig and Ariana, played by Will Ferrell and Cheri Oteri, on Saturday Night Live
- Eastland Heights High Highlanderettes, including Danielle, from The New Guy
- East High Wildcat Cheerleaders from the films High School Musical, High School Musical 2 and High School Musical 3: Senior Year
- Albert Einstein High Cheerleaders, from the novel The Princess Diaries
- Gary Oak's cheer squad from the anime Pokémon
- Grove Lionettes, including Lana Thomas (real-life former cheerleader Mandy Moore), from the film The Princess Diaries
- Hemery High Cheerleaders, including Buffy Summers, from the film Buffy the Vampire Slayer
- Illyria Academy Cheerleaders from the 2006 film She's the Man
- John Hughes High Waspettes, including Priscilla (Jaime Pressly), from Not Another Teen Movie
- Leawood A-Squad, including Dominique Irwin and Leawood B-Squad, including Erin & Michelle Healy and Stacie Cooper.
- Lancer University Hellcats, from the television series Hellcats
- Lincoln High Emancipators ("the Fighting E's") Cheerleaders or the Betty Gang, from the 2001 film Sugar & Spice, including: Diane "the Mastermind" Weston (Marley Shelton), Lucy "the Brain" Whitman, Kansas "the Rebel" Hill (Mena Suvari), Cleo "the Stalker" Miller, Fern "the Terminator" Rogers, Hanna "the Virgin" Wold (Rachel Blanchard), and Lisa "the Informant" Janusch
- Middleton High Mad Dogs Cheerleaders, including Kim Possible and Bonnie Rockwaller
- North Valley Fighting Frogs, including Shelby (Julie Gonzalo), from A Cinderella Story
- The team of cheerleaders in Osu! Tatakae! Ouendan. The sequel has another group of cheerleaders.
- Pacific Vista High Pirates Cheerleaders, including Britney Allen (Hayden Panettiere), from Bring It On: All or Nothing
- Polk High "Polk Dots", including Kelly Bundy (Christina Applegate), from the television series Married... with Children
- Rancho Carne High Toros Cheerleaders, from the film Bring It On, including: Torrance Shipman (real-life former cheerleader Kirsten Dunst), Missy Pantone (Eliza Dushku), Courtney Egbert (real-life former cheerleader Clare Kramer), Whitney (Nicole Bilderback), Darcy (Tsianina Joelson), Big Red (Lindsay Sloane), Kasey (Rini Bell) and Carver (Bianca Kajlich); and their "cheer-boys", Les (Huntley Ritter), Jan (Nathan West) and Aaron (Richard Hillman)
- Riverdale Vixens, including Cheryl Blossom (Madelaine Petsch) from the television series Riverdale.
- Rocky Creek High Drillerettes, from The New Guy
- Silverado West Middle School Bulldogs Cheerleaders including Bella Dawson, Sophie Delarosa, and Pepper Silverstein from the television series Bella and the Bulldogs
- Smallville Crows from Smallville
- Spartanettes, including Jane Burnham (Thora Birch) and Angela Hayes (Mena Suvari), from the 1999 film American Beauty
- Spirit Squad, a tag team in World Wrestling Entertainment
- The Star Squad in Lucky Star
- Sunnydale High Razorbacks Cheerleaders, including Buffy Summers and Cordelia Chase, from the television series Buffy the Vampire Slayer
- SVH Gladiatorettes, including Jessica Wakefield, Sandra Bacon, Melissa Fox, Tia Ramirez, Cherie Reese, Maria Santelli, Jeannie West, Annie Whitman, Robin Wilson, and Jade Wu, from Sweet Valley High
- Tree Hill High Ravenettes, including Brooke Davis, Rachel Gatina, Peyton Sawyer, Haley James Scott and Bevin, from the television series One Tree Hill
- Union Wells High Wildcats Cheerleaders, including Claire Bennet (Hayden Panettiere) and Jackie Wilcox, from Heroes
- Warrior and Mighty Duck Cheerleaders from D3: The Mighty Ducks
- William McKinley High School Cheerios, including Quinn Fabray (Dianna Agron), from Glee
- Christy, Ping, McKenzie and other cheerleaders from Groove Squad
- Breakers, all-men university cheerleaders squad from Japanese novel Cheer Boys!! by Ryō Asai. The novel was later adapted as manga and anime.
