= Zea (surname) =

Zea is a surname. Notable people with the surname include:

- Jaime Zea (born 1970), Mayor of the Villa El Salvador district of Lima, Peru
- Kristi Zea (born 1948), American production designer, costume designer, art director, and director
- María Luisa Zea (1913–2002), Mexican actress and singer
- Natalie Zea (born 1975), American actress
- Leopoldo Zea Aguilar (1912–2004), Mexican philosopher
- Francisco Antonio Zea (1766–1822), South American statesman, diplomat and botanist
- Asunción de Zea-Bermúdez (1862-1936), Spanish writer and essayist

== See also ==
- Cea (surname)
