= Alex Gibbs (American football) =

American football coach (1941–2021)

Personal information
- Born: February 22, 1941; Morganton, North Carolina, U.S.
- Died: July 12, 2021 (aged 80); Phoenix, Arizona, U.S.

Career information
- College: Davidson

Career history
- Mount Airy (NC) Head coach (1966–1968); Duke Defensive backs (1969–1970); Kentucky Defensive backs (1971–1972); West Virginia Defensive backs (1973–1974); Ohio State Offensive coordinator/offensive line (1975–1978); Auburn Offensive coordinator (1979–1981); Georgia Offensive line (1982–1983); Denver Broncos Offensive line (1984–1987); Los Angeles Raiders Special Assistant to the head coach (1988) Assistant head coach (1989); San Diego Chargers Offensive line (1990–1991); Indianapolis Colts Offensive line (1992); Kansas City Chiefs Offensive line (1993–1994); Denver Broncos Assistant head coach/offensive line (1995–2003); Atlanta Falcons Assistant head coach/offensive line (2004) consultant (2005) Offensive line/consultant (2006); Houston Texans Assistant head coach/offensive line (2008–2009); Seattle Seahawks Assistant head coach/offensive line (2010); Denver Broncos Offensive line consultant (2013)

Awards and highlights
- 2× Super Bowl champion (XXXII, XXXIII); NCHSAA 3A State champion (1968)

Alexander Gibbs, Jr. (February 22, 1941 – July 12, 2021) was an American professional football coach who was a longtime offensive line coach in the National Football League (NFL). He coached college football for over a decade before joining the Denver Broncos of the NFL in 1984. He won two Super Bowls with Denver.

Gibbs was a well known proponent of the zone blocking scheme and popularized its use while he was offensive line coach of the Broncos. Denver became famous at that time for its use of smaller and more agile offensive linemen and the success of its running backs, most notably Terrell Davis. Gibbs was to enter his first season on Pete Carroll's Seattle Seahawks staff as the assistant head coach and offensive line coach in 2010, but announced his unexpected retirement a week before the start of the NFL's 2010 regular season. In May 2013, he returned to the Broncos in a consultant role for one year.

Gibbs died at his home in Phoenix, Arizona, on July 12, 2021.
