= Kiara Nowlin =

American gymnast

Kiara Nowlin Barry
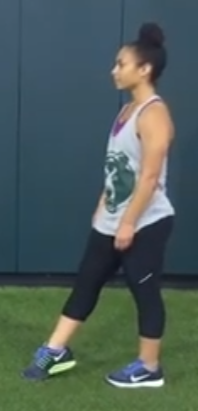
- Nowlin at Baylor University in 2015

Personal information
- Born: Kiara Elizabeth Nowlin; November 27, 1995 (age 30) Oxnard, California, U.S.
- Spouse: Sean Barry (m. 2024)

Gymnastics career
- Discipline: Tumbling; Cheerleading
- Country represented: United States
- College team: Baylor Bears
- Gym: California Allstars
- Retired: 2017
Medal record
Women's Tumbling
Representing the United States
- Children: 1

Kiara Elizabeth Nowlin Barry (born November 27, 1995) is an American retired gymnast and cheerleader. She competed on the U.S. Junior National Trampoline and Tumbling Team and was a three-time gold medalist at the World Age Games. She was also a three-time gold medalist at The Cheerleading Worlds. She signed with Baylor University as a member of the acrobatics and tumbling team, where she won multiple national titles.

== Early life and education ==
Nowlin was born on November 27, 1995, in Oxnard, California to William and Monique Nowlin. She attended Oaks Christian High School in Westlake Village before attending Baylor University, where she studied health sciences before switching to public relations and Mandarin Chinese. She earned a graduate degree in business administration from California Lutheran University.

== Career ==
=== Cheerleading ===
As a teenager, Nowlin was a three-time gold medalist at The Cheerleading Worlds as a member of California Allstars.

She was a guest star, alongside fellow all-star cheerleaders Maddie Gardner and Gabi Butler, in the Cheer Channel's web series, Secret Diary of an American Cheerleader in 2012.

=== Gymnastics ===
Nowlin began training in gymnastics when she was eighteen months old. When she was eight years old, she transitioned from artistic gymnastics to power tumbling. She competed in her first world championship in Canada for the 11-12 age group, followed by a championship in Russia for the 13-14 age group, followed by a championship in France for the 15-16 age group. Nowlin was a three-time gold medalist and a double mini gold medalist power tumbler at the World Age Games. She was a member of USA Gymnastics Junior National Trampoline and Tumbling Team. She appeared on The Ellen DeGeneres Show as a featured athlete.

She signed with Baylor University's acrobatics & tumbling team in 2014, competing in all seven meets her freshman year and qualifying for the National Collegiate Acrobatics & Tumbling Association Individual Championships in quad tumbling and 6 element tumbling, winning the national title. Her sophomore year she competed in all seven meets and was named a National Collegiate Acrobatics & Tumbling Association ALl-American and Most Outstanding Player. She won five titles at the NCATA Individual Championships in 2015. In 2016, she competed in ten meets and qualified for five events at the NCATA Individual Championships, winning tumbling aerial heat and receiving a perfect ten score in six element tumbling. Her senior year, in 2017, Nowlin participated in ten meets and was named NCATA MVP for a second time, the only athlete from Baylor to earn the honor.

=== Later career ===
Following her collegiate career, Nowlin worked for a time as a stuntwoman in Los Angeles. She then began a career in public relations while attending graduate school for business administration. As of 2025, Nowlin is a public information officer for a county in California.

== Personal life ==
Nowlin married Sean Barry on September 6, 2024. They have one daughter.
