= Las Pedroñeras =

- Municipality
- Las Pedroñeras

- Flag Coat of arms

- Location in Spain
- Coordinates: 39°26′59″N 2°40′23″W
- Country: Spain
- Autonomous Community: Castile-La Mancha
- Province: Cuenca
- Comarca: La Mancha

Government
  - Mayor: Jose Manuel Tortosa Ruiz (PP)

Area
  - Total: 225 km^{2} (87 sq mi)
- Elevation (AMSL): 745 m (2,444 ft)

Population (2025-01-01)
  - Total: 6,416
  - Density: 28.5/km^{2} (73.9/sq mi)
- Time zone: UTC+1 (CET)
  - Summer (DST): UTC+2 (GMT +1)
- Postal code: 16660
- Area code: +34 (Spain) + 969 (Cuenca)
- Website: www.laspedroneras.es

Las Pedroñeras is a small town and municipality in the province of Cuenca, in the central region of the autonomous community of Castile-La Mancha, southwestern Spain.

It was founded around 1500, and it is believed that the name comes from "Pedro" (Stone in Spanish) + "Heras" (Farming Field in Spanish).

Las Pedroñeras has about 7000 people in the winter and 10,000 in the summer. Official data from INE is 7,058 inhabitants.

== Typical products ==
The main activity is garlic farming and wine making. In Spain Pedroñeras is called the "Garlic Capital", because the good quality of its Ajos Morados (purple garlic), publicized on television by Karlos Arguiñano, a Spanish chef. Every summer the International Garlic Congress takes place in the town.

== Notable people ==
- Asunción de Zea-Bermúdez (1862–1936), writer and essayist
