= Luke Lambert =

NASCAR crew chief

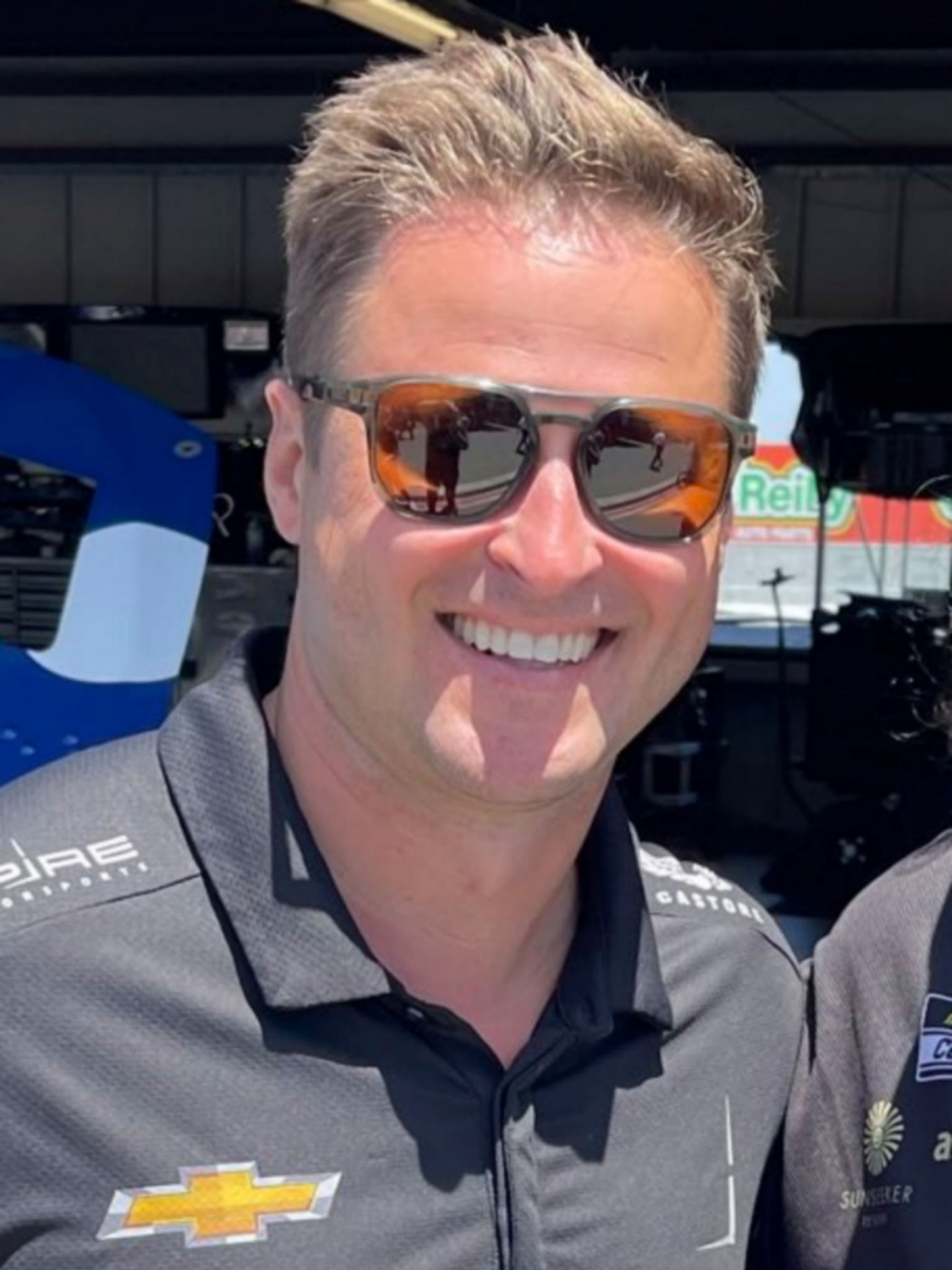
- Lambert at Sonoma Raceway in 2024

Personal information
- Born: Lucas A. Lambert; 1981 or 1982 (age 43–44) Mount Airy, North Carolina, U.S.
- Education: North Carolina State University
- Occupation: Crew chief

Sport
- Country: United States
- Sport: NASCAR Cup Series
- Team: 77. Spire Motorsports

Lucas A. Lambert (born 1981/2) is an American NASCAR crew chief who works for Spire Motorsports as the crew chief of their No. 77 Chevrolet Camaro ZL1 in the NASCAR Cup Series driven by Carson Hocevar.

Lambert was previously Cup Series crew chief for Richard Childress Racing, Roush Fenway Racing (now RFK Racing) and Legacy Motor Club. He first worked on Jeff Burton's No. 31 RCR car in the Cup Series as an engineer and a crew chief, then became the crew chief for their No. 2 car in the Nationwide (now Xfinity) Series driven by Elliott Sadler, followed by a second stint as a Cup Series crew chief on the No. 31 (later renumbered as the No. 8) car, driven by Burton, Ryan Newman, and Daniel Hemric. He then moved to Roush as the crew chief for their No. 17 car, driven by Chris Buescher, and later the team's No. 6 car where he reunited with Newman, and then to JRM as the crew chief for Gragson and their No. 9 car, and continued with Gragson when he moved up to the Cup Series full-time in 2023 driving for LMC, staying as the crew chief through the rest of the year with other drivers, including Hocevar, after Gragson's suspension and departure from the team.

== Racing career ==
Lambert became a NASCAR fan as a child after attending races at Bristol Motor Speedway which led him to start racing go-karts. He attended college at North Carolina State University and participated in the university's Wolfpack Motorsports program as a driver and mechanic.

=== 2005–2019: Richard Childress Racing ===
After graduating college in 2005, Lambert worked for Richard Childress Racing as a mechanical engineer; he was moved up to race engineer in 2007 to work with Jeff Burton's team. When Burton's crew chief, Todd Berrier, was fired midway through the 2011 season, RCR tapped Lambert to take over crew chiefing duties of the No. 31. Lambert moved to RCR's Nationwide Series No. 2 car to be Elliott Sadler's crew chief in 2012. The duo won four races and finished second in the standings. As a result of that successful season, he was moved back up to the Cup Series to Burton's No. 31 car again in 2013. While Burton left the team at the end of 2013, Lambert stayed on with new driver Ryan Newman in 2014. In his first season with Newman, Lambert guided the team to the Championship 4 in the first season of the new knockout-style playoff format. In 2015, Lambert was suspended six races for illegal tire modifications in the race at Auto Club Speedway. Lambert earned his first Cup win atop the box with Newman at Phoenix Raceway in 2017. When Newman left for Roush Fenway Racing in 2019 to drive the team's No. 6 car, he was replaced in the renumbered No. 8 car by Daniel Hemric, and Lambert remained the crew chief of the car.

=== 2020–2021: Roush Fenway Racing ===
In 2020, Lambert left RCR to move to Roush Fenway Racing to be the crew chief for their No. 17 car, driven by Chris Buescher. On October 3, 2021, RFR announced that Lambert and their other crew chief, Scott Graves, would be switching teams beginning at the race at the Charlotte Roval, and Lambert reunited with Ryan Newman and became the crew chief of the No. 6, while Graves moved to Buescher's No. 17.

=== 2022: JR Motorsports ===
On January 4, 2022, it was announced that Lambert would be the new crew chief for Noah Gragson and the JR Motorsports No. 9 car in the Xfinity Series after Gragson's previous crew chief, Dave Elenz, moved up to the Cup Series to crew chief Erik Jones and the No. 43 car for Richard Petty Motorsports, which would soon after become Petty GMS Motorsports.

=== 2023: Legacy Motor Club ===
On October 25, 2022, it was announced that Lambert would move back to the Cup Series in 2023 and would continue to crew chief Noah Gragson. The two of them would join Petty GMS Motorsports on the team's No. 42 car. After it was announced that Lambert and Gragson would be joining the team in 2023, Jimmie Johnson became a part-owner of the team and it was renamed Legacy Motor Club. In June, Gragson got injured in a crash in the race at Gateway and GMS Racing Truck Series driver Grant Enfinger filled in for him at Sonoma. When Gragson would be indefinitely suspended in August and left the team soon after, Lambert worked with Josh Berry, Mike Rockenfeller, Carson Hocevar and John Hunter Nemechek who finished the season in the No. 42 car.

=== 2024–present: Spire Motorsports ===
On November 13, 2023, Lambert left his job at the Legacy Motor Club No. 42 car the team announced that he would be replaced by Ben Beshore in 2024. John Hunter Nemechek became the new full-time driver of the No. 42 and Beshore was his crew chief in the Xfinity Series with Joe Gibbs Racing in 2023. On December 6, it was announced that Lambert would crew chief for Spire Motorsports on their No. 77 car in the Cup Series in 2024, which would be driven full-time by Carson Hocevar, who Lambert crew chiefed at LMC at the end of the 2023 season.

== Personal life ==
Lambert is a native of Mount Airy, North Carolina and graduated from Mount Airy High School in 2001. He graduated from North Carolina State University in 2005 with a degree in mechanical engineering.
