= Kevin Iñigo Peralta =

Peruvian business administrator and politician

Clodoaldo Kevin Yñigo Peralta (Villa El Salvador, September 15, 1995) is a Peruvian business administrator and politician. He served as mayor of the district of Villa El Salvador from January 2019 to December 2022 for the Peru Patria Segura.

== Political career ==
Mayor of Villa El Salvador

In the 2018 municipal elections, Kevin Yñigo ran for mayor of the District of Villa El Salvador for Perú Patria Segura. This was due to the prohibition of immediate reelection of his brother Guido Iñigo Peralta. At the end of the electoral process, Yñigo was elected mayor of Villa El Salvador, being the youngest in history at only 23 years of age, for the 2019-2022 municipal term with 80,523 votes.

During his administration, he announced that 50% of the district's budget would be invested in infrastructure. In January 2020, following the tragic fire in VES, Yñigo faced controversy for not making public statements about the event and for blaming his brother’s administration for the poor condition of the roads.

He has been affiliated with the Alianza para el Progreso party since September 2021.
