= UNC-Chapel Hill Cheerleading =

The University of North Carolina has run cheerleading teams since 1914, performing at Tar Heels sports events. They have frequently participated in cheerleading competitions at the national level. Currently there are two teams: JV (Junior Varsity) and Varsity.

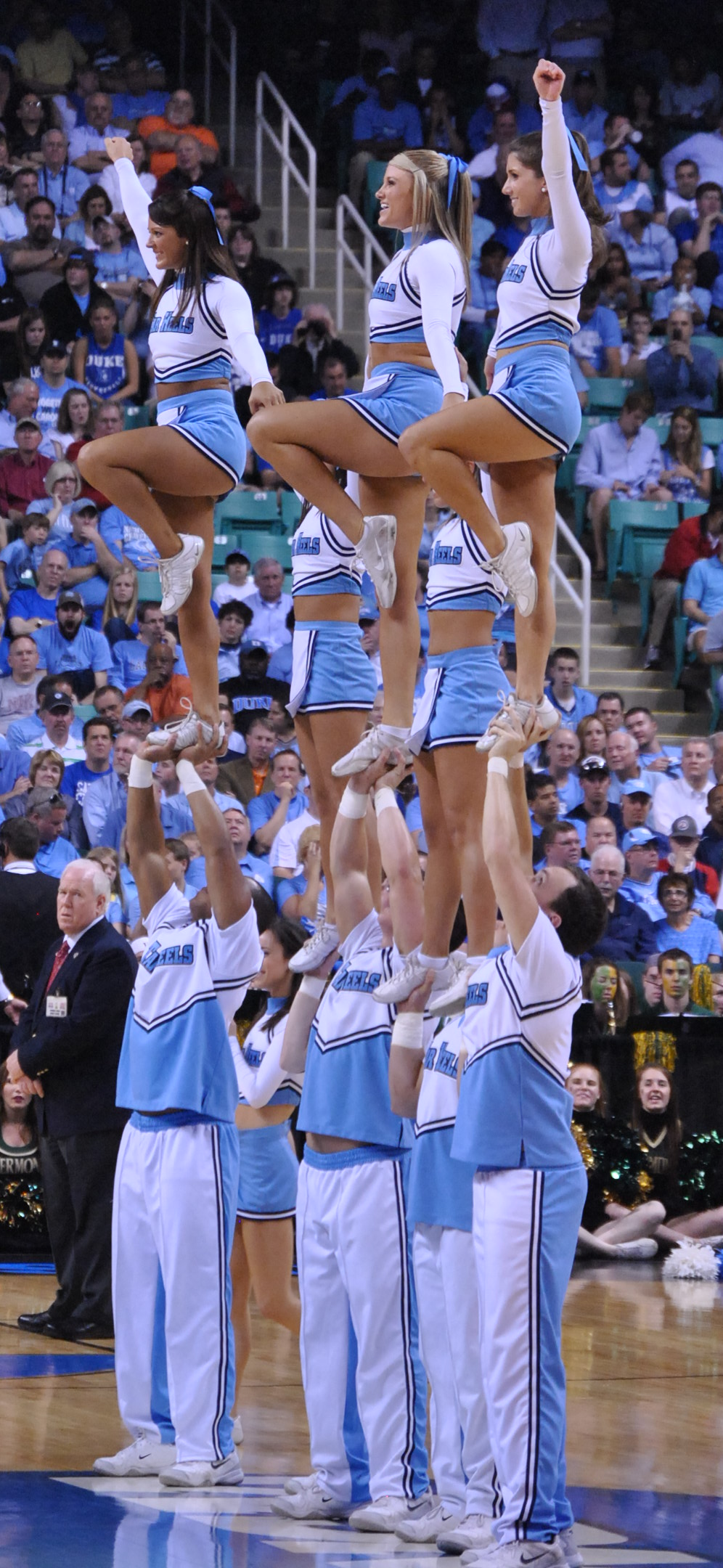
UNC cheerleaders

== History ==
In 1914, Frank Porter Graham was the first student to organize cheerleading at the University of North Carolina at Chapel Hill. According to The Daily Tar Heel, Graham said, "I was trying out for the baseball team, but I didn't make the regular squad. As a substitute I got in the habit of leading the cheering when I wasn't needed. The next thing I knew I was a cheerleader." Graham was succeeded by Charlie Coggins, Kay Kyser, Billy Arthur, Vic Huggins, Norm Sper and other notable university figures. In 1940, the university officially approved the program's transition to a co-ed team.

=== National recognition ===
The UNC cheerleading team was ranked fifth in the nation by ICF in 1974, and third in 1975. It won the CBS National Collegiate Cheerleading Championship in 1978 and was runner-up in 1979. Later it won the 1994 UCA Division I-A National title and 1997 NCA Division I-A. This cheer team is part of the National Cheerleading Association, which was created to ensure the safety of cheerleaders across the world. In order to have a cheerleading squad at a university, the team must be associated with a national cheer association. This will not only provide credibility to the team, but will ensure the safety of the cheerleaders. The National Cheerleaders Association has rules in place, such as concussion testing, spotters, and medical care to the cheerleaders in order to prevent injury

== Teams ==
The UNC cheerleading program consists of two co-ed squads: JV and Varsity. Both teams cheer for home football games and Varsity travels to away games. In the winter, the JV squad cheers at all home women's basketball games and Varsity at all home men's basketball games. Both squads cheer on their respective teams during the ACC and NCAA basketball tournaments.

=== Varsity ===
The Varsity squad is generally composed of 15–20 members with 6–8 couples of male bases and female flyers, as well as 2–4 female tumblers. Varsity members include seniors, juniors and few sophomores.

=== Junior Varsity ===
The 2012 JV cheerleading team had about 40 members. The co-ed team is also composed of male bases, female flyers and female tumblers. In addition to participating at home football and women's basketball games, members of the JV squad attend UNC volleyball matches, men's soccer games, and gymnastics meets. Generally speaking, members are required to cheer at least one year on JV before moving up to Varsity. The majority of members on JV are underclassmen. One of the reasons behind the creation of a JV team is for squad members who are not yet ready for the skill levels or leadership of a Varsity team. With the JV team, cheerleaders are still able to get a similar experience of a Varsity cheerleader but at a less intense level. At many schools, the JV team is used to prepare squad members for future Varsity experience.

== Practice schedule ==
Varsity and JV practices are held twice weekly, and there are additional weight sessions. Before home football games, the UNC cheerleading program practices with the Marching Tar Heels on Navy Field to coordinate the football pre-game show.

== Community outreach ==
The UNC cheerleading team regards itself as an integral part of the Carolina community. Each year the team is committed to giving back to the town and campus. In the past, members have made visits to local hospitals, appeared at numerous charity events, volunteered on campus and made appearances on behalf of the athletic community. The Carolina cheerleaders have recently participated in local 5ks (Get Heeled, Fitness World of Durham), UNC Dance Marathon, and local elementary schools health and book fairs.

== Coaching staff ==
- Brown Walters, Varsity Head Coach
- Curt Brossman, Junior Varsity Head Coach
- Taylor Brossman, Junior Varsity Head Coach
- Bo Farley, Junior Varsity Assistant Coach
- Carly Hinson, Tumbling Coach
- Andrei Robinson, Tumbling Coach

== Tryouts ==
Cheerleading tryouts are typically held in the fall during the second week of school. Tryouts are also held in April. High school seniors are eligible to try out in April if they been accepted to the university for early admission. Those who make the team in the spring are required to participate in summer workouts in preparation for the upcoming season. During the tryout process, the coaches determine each athlete’s skill level, potential, leadership abilities, and crowd presence. The coaches tend to look for experienced flyers and tumblers. Tryouts last about three hours and all prospective athletes must have the required paperwork filled out and approved by Sports Medicine prior to tryouts. Two tryouts are held during the year: fall and spring tryouts. During the fall, tryouts are typically held during the second week of school. In the spring, high school seniors are eligible to try out in April and May if they have been accepted into the university. One of the major parts of tryouts is the tryout attire. Athletes should come dressed prepared to work out. Girls should wear their hair half up half down or all the way up in a ponytail. Appropriate cheer shoes will be worn at all times.

== Eligibility ==
Those eligible to join the cheerleading teams are full-time students at the University of North Carolina at Chapel Hill, who maintain a minimum 2.0 GPA and remain in good academic standing with the university

== Scholarships ==
Although the university does not award scholarships to members of the cheerleading team, the program participates in fundraisers to offer book scholarships to each senior cheerleader.

== Notable alumni ==
- Maddie Gardner, journalist
- Frank Porter Graham, politician
- Kay Kyser, bandleader and radio personality

== Sources ==
- Paquita Fine (1956-12-16). "Talk Over the Old, the Future". The News and Observer. Raleigh.
- Rick Brewer (September 1974). "Carolina Cheerleaders: A Rich Tradition". The Daily Tar Heel. Chapel Hill.
- "What's NCA Staff All About". National Cheerleaders Association.
- "Athletic Bands". The University of North Carolina at Chapel Hill.
