= Villa El Salvador =

District in Lima, Peru

- District
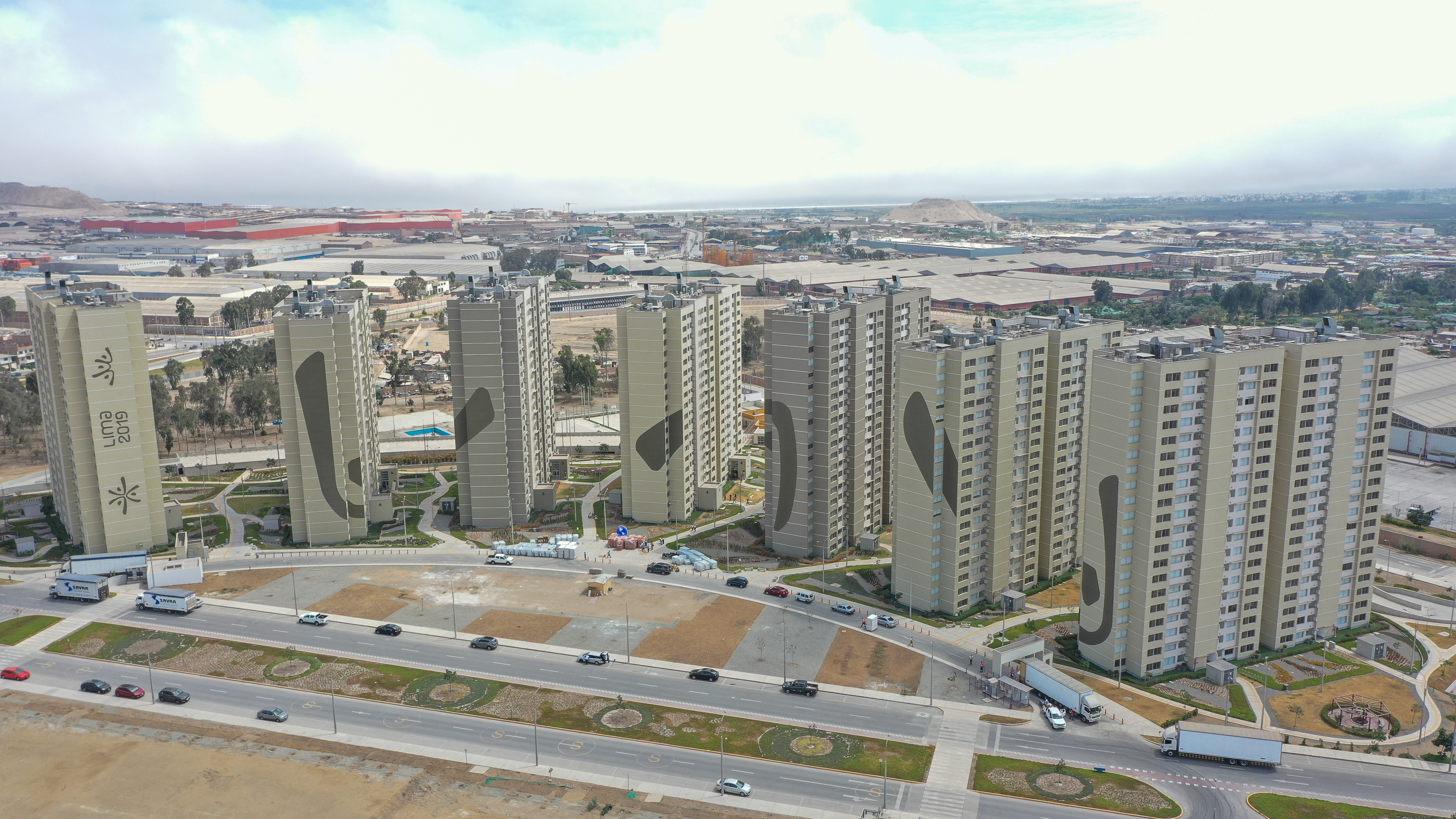

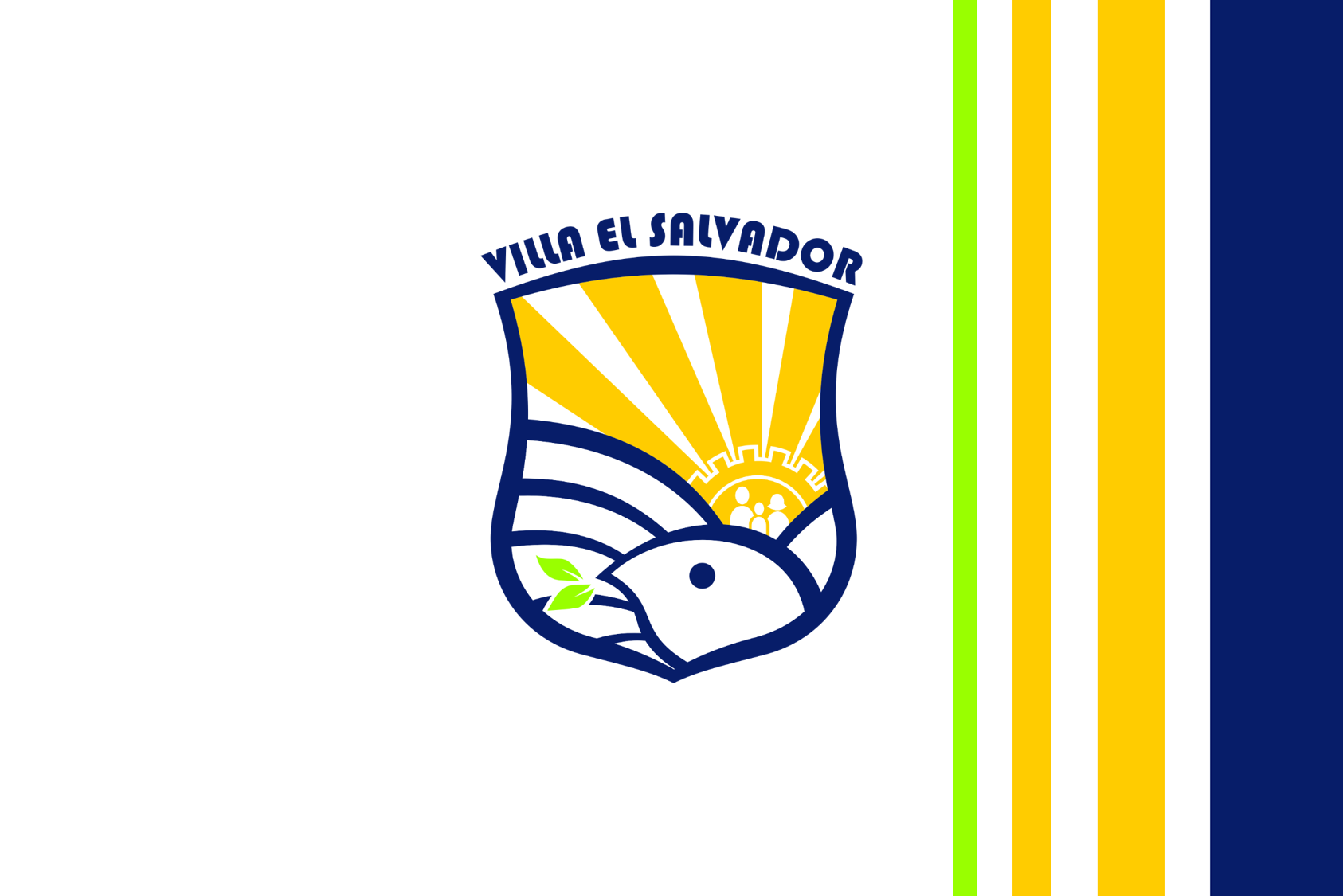
- Flag Coat of arms

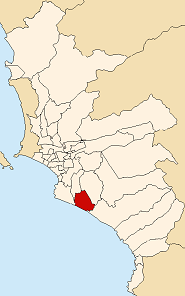
- Location of Villa el Salvador in Lima
- Coordinates: 12°3′0″S 77°0′0″W
- Country: Peru
- Region: Lima
- Province: Lima
- Founded: 1971
- Capital: Cercado de Villa El Salvador

Government
  - Mayor: Guido Iñigo (2023–2026)

Area
  - Total: 35.46 km^{2} (13.69 sq mi)
- Elevation: 143 m (469 ft)

Population (2023)
  - Total: 441,794
  - Density: 12,460/km^{2} (32,270/sq mi)
- Time zone: UTC-5 (PET)
- UBIGEO: 150142
- Website: munives.gob.pe

Villa El Salvador is an urban, largely residential coastal district on the outskirts of Lima, Peru. It borders the district of Chorrillos on the west; the Pacific Ocean on the southwest; Lurín on the southeast; Villa María del Triunfo on the east and San Juan de Miraflores on the north.

== History ==
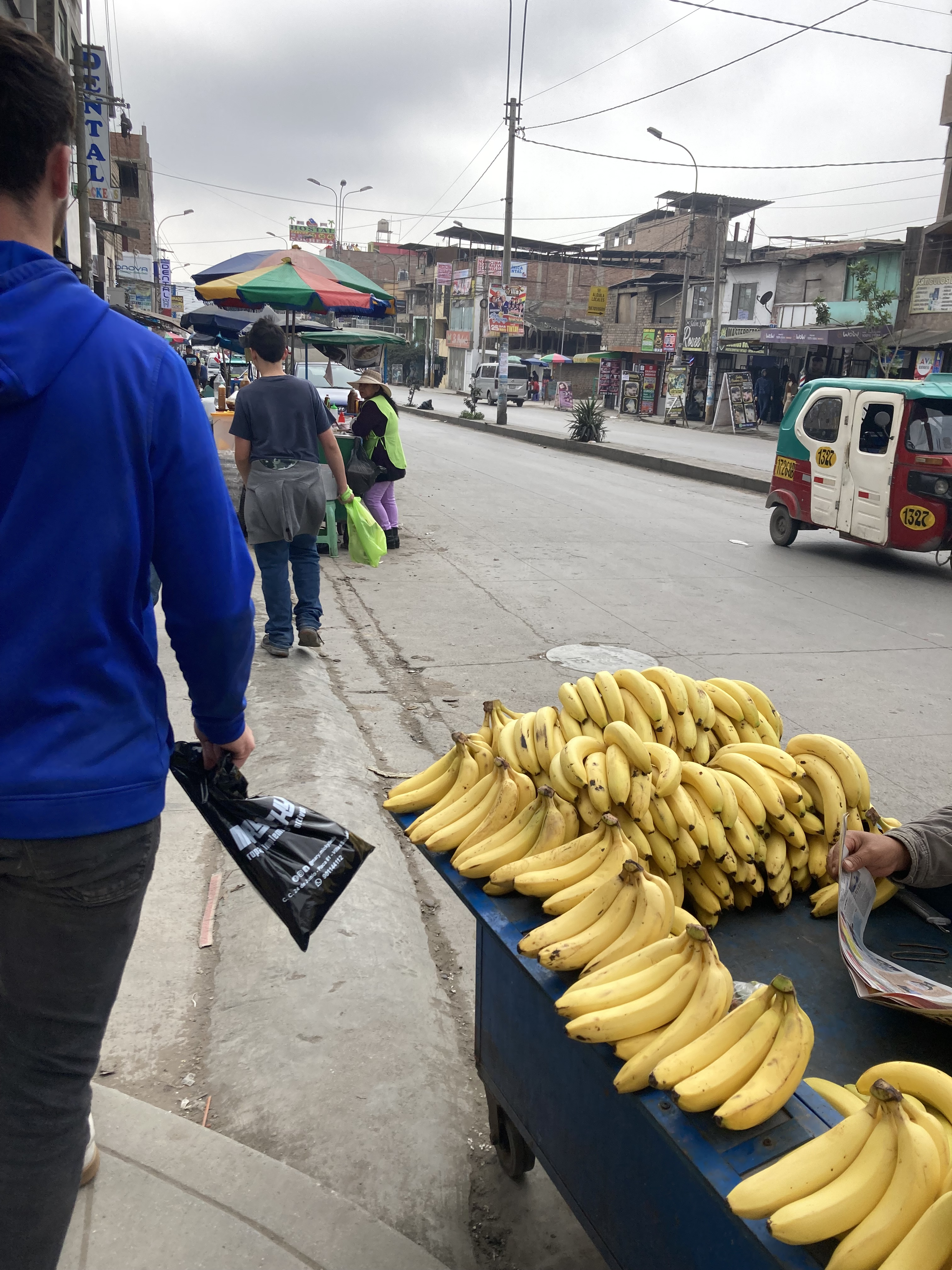
Villa El Salvador in 2024

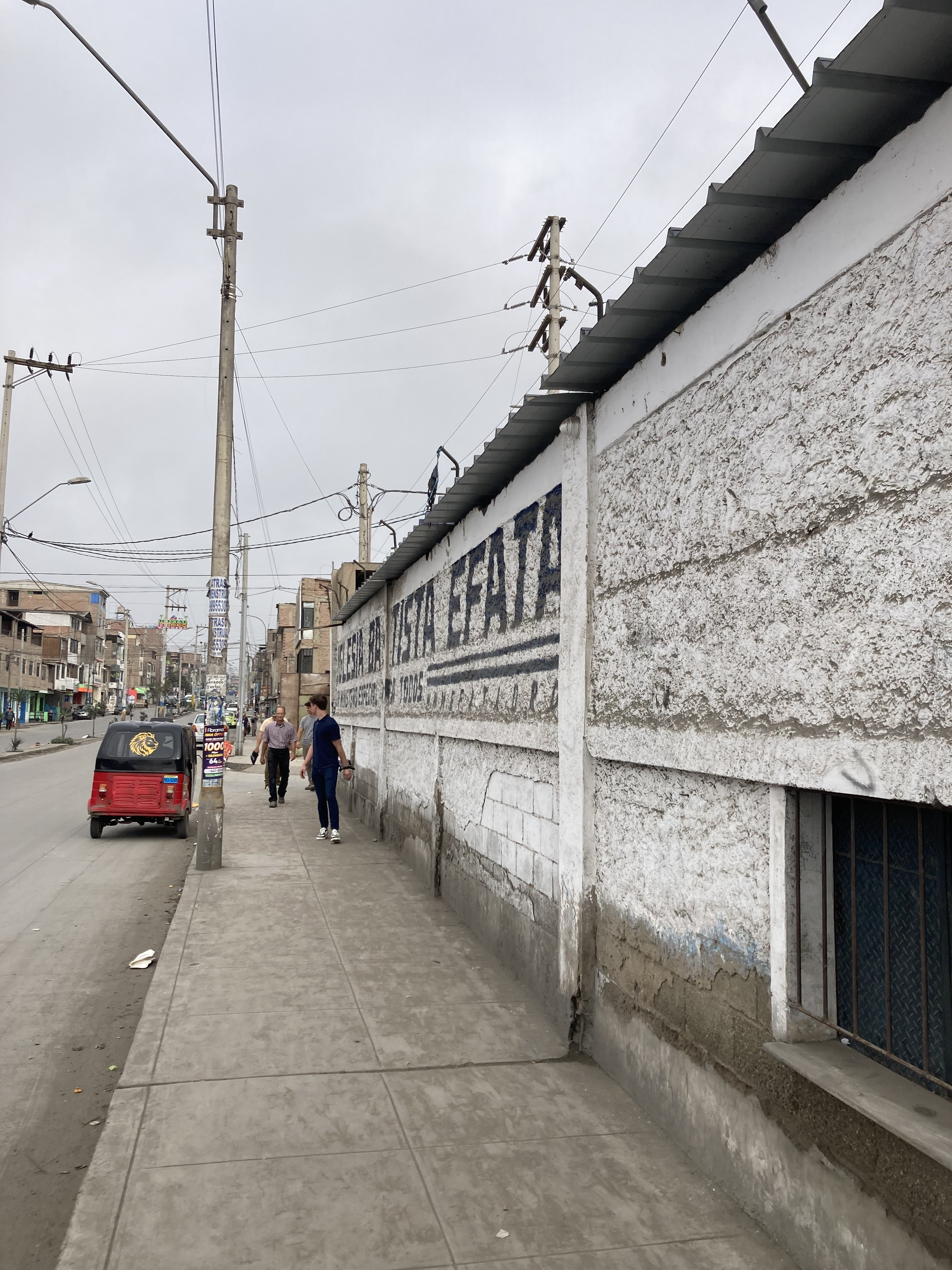
Villa El Salvador in 2024

Villa El Salvador began in 1971 as a squatted pueblo joven (or shanty town) in the vast, empty sand flats to the south of Lima because of the urgent housing needs of immigrant families who had left the sierra of central Peru. A land invasion quickly created a town of 25,000 people. By 2008, it had grown to 350,000 people. Villa El Salvador evolved into a huge urban zone, largely self-organizing, for which it won some fame. Largely through the efforts of its inhabitants, the neighborhood was supplied with electricity, water, and sewage.

Villa El Salvador served as the home base for the activist María Elena Moyano, who helped organize the Federación Popular de Mujeres de Villa El Salvador (Fepomuves), a federation of women, which grew to encompass activities such as public kitchens, health committees, the Vaso de Leche program (which supplied children with milk), income-generating projects, and committees for basic education. Moyano was killed by members of the Shining Path, which used Villa El Salvador as a base in Lima.

Since June 1, 1983, Villa El Salvador has been formally (by law № 23605) established as a district within the Lima Province. In 1987, the community received a Prince of Asturias Award in recognition of its achievements. Villa El Salvador is twinned with Rezé, France and, since 2006, with Tübingen, Germany.

== Authorities ==
=== Mayors ===
- 2019–2022: Kevin Íñigo Peralta.
- 2011–2014: Guido Íñigo Peralta.
- 2003–2010: Jaime Zea Usca.
- 1999–2002: Martín Pumar Vílchez.

== Festivities ==
- October: Lord of Miracles

== Twin towns ==
- Arnhem in Gelderland, Netherlands
- Amstelveen in North Holland, Netherlands
- Tübingen in Baden-Württemberg, Germany

== Historical slum photos ==
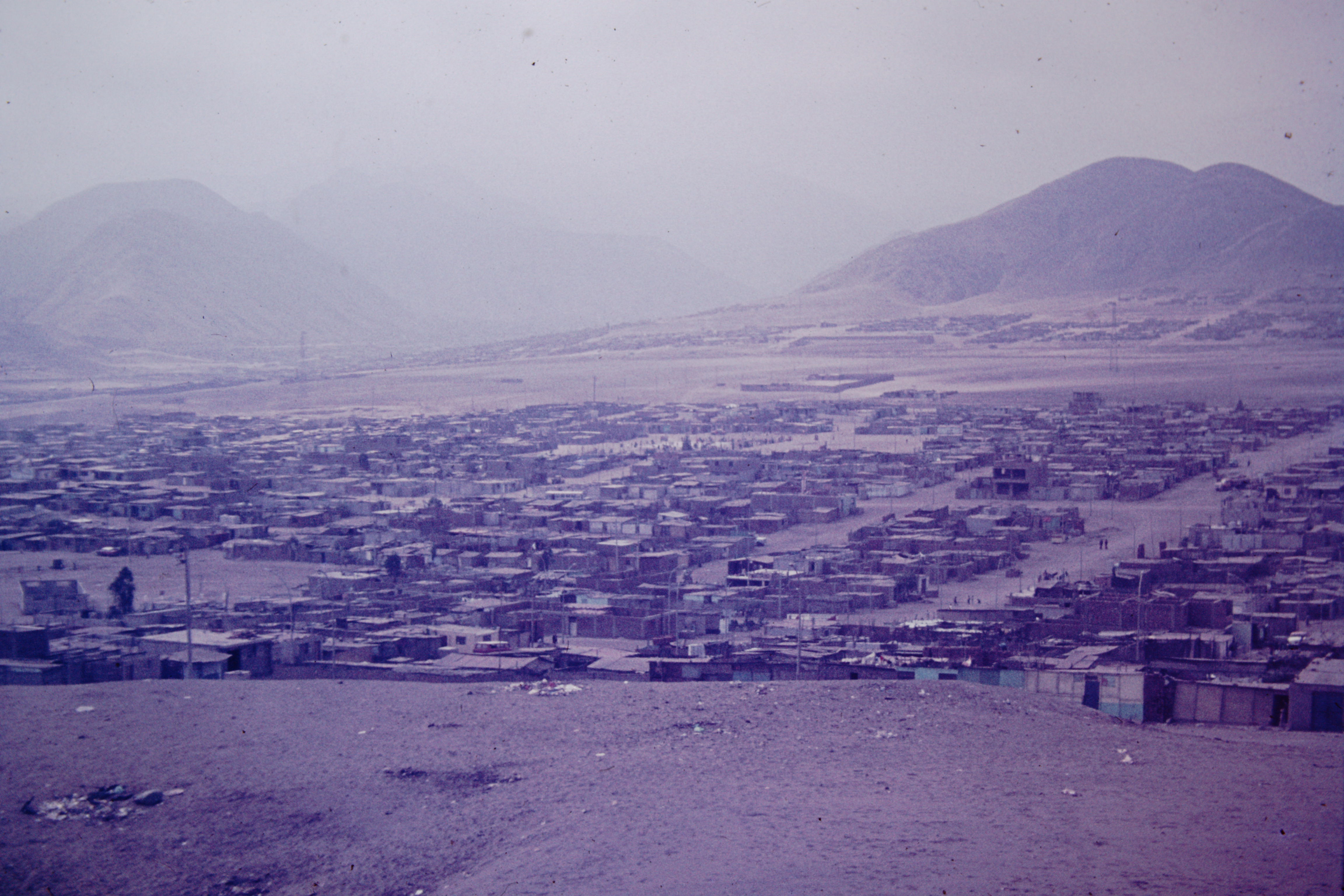
Overview of the El Salvador slum, 1975

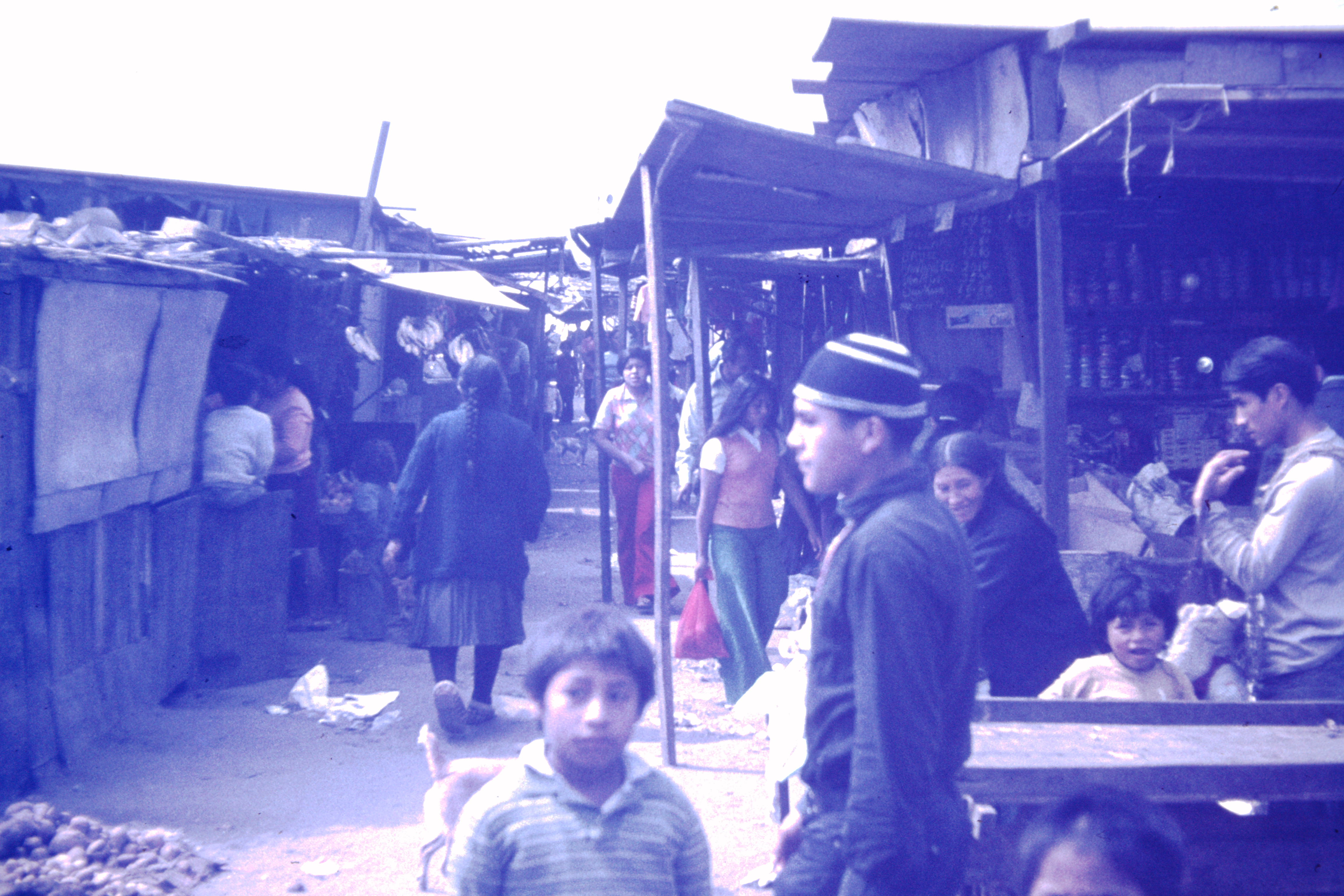
Slum street, 1975

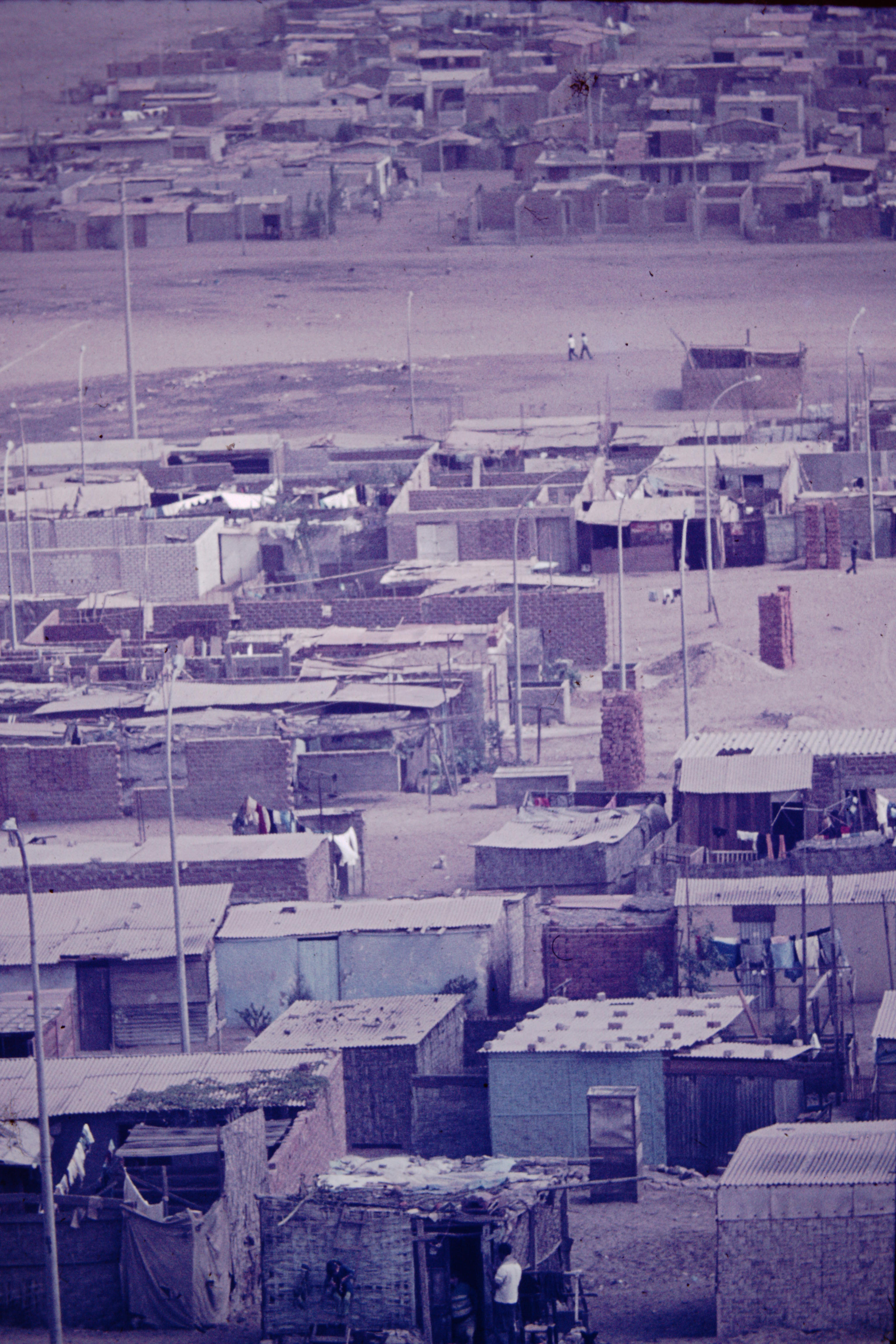
Sheds in El Salvador, 1975

== See also ==
- Administrative divisions of Peru
