= Asunción de Zea-Bermúdez =

Spanish writer and essayist

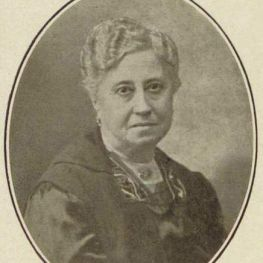
- (undated)
- Born: Asunción de Zea-Bermúdez y Montoya; 2 February 1862 Las Pedroñeras, Cuenca, Spain
- Died: 21 August 1936 (aged 74) Madrid, Spain
- Occupation: Writer
- Genre: Essayist
- Subject: Religion; Miguel de Cervantes
- Notable works: Compendio de la doctrina cristiana para el uso del apostolado de las doctrinas (1903); Influencia de la mujer en la regeneración social de los católicos (1904); Post Núbila: sobre la verdadera cuna de Cervantes (1916)
- Spouse: Jesús Contreras y Arcas
- Children: María Esperanza Contreras y Zea Bermúdez
- Relatives: Rosaura Montoya Perea and Fernando Francisco de Zea Bermúdez, the second Count of Colombí (parents)

Doña Asunción de Zea-Bermúdez y Montoya (2 February 1862 – 21 August 1936) was a Spanish writer and essayist.

== Biography ==
Asunción de Zea-Bermúdez y Montoya was born in Las Pedroñeras, Cuenca on 2 February 1862. Her parents were Rosaura Montoya Perea and Fernando Francisco de Zea Bermúdez, the second Count of Colombí. On 18 October 1893 she married Jesús Contreras y Arcas, from which marriage María Esperanza Contreras y Zea Bermúdez (1894–1938) was born, the fourth Countess of Colombí.

Throughout her life, Zea-Bermúdez maintained a strong connection with her birthplace, where she spent long periods of time, showing interest in Cervantes-related topics.

As an essayist, she published two books on moral and Christian doctrines: Compendio de la doctrina cristiana para el uso del apostolado de las doctrinas (Compendium of Christian Doctrine for the Use of the Apostolate of Doctrines) (1903) and Influencia de la mujer en la regeneración social de los católicos (Influence of Women in the Social Regeneration of Catholics) (1904).

The first of these works was widely recommended at the time for primary education. La Gaceta de Instrucción Pública and La Escuela Moderna published some provisions in this regard. In Compendio, the author aimed to explain the Catechism of the Catholic Church in a simple manner, so that it could be used as a manual by the group of women who formed the Socias del Apostolado de las Doctrinas (Associates of the Apostolate of Doctrines). In these works, she expressed great concern for these teachings to reach all social classes, especially the lower classes.

Zea-Bermúdez engaged in a public debate with Antonio Castellanos regarding the birthplace of Cervantes, with Zea-Bermúdez maintaining that it could only be Alcalá de Henares, while Castellanos defended Alcázar de San Juan as the birthplace. After the discussion, Zea-Bermúdez summarized the conclusions in a work, Post Núbila: sobre la verdadera cuna de Cervantes (After Clouds: On the True Cradle of Cervantes), which she presented on 24 April 1916 at a literary competition held in Albacete, for which she received the second prize. In this work, she displayed clear argumentation and subtle irony.

In 1929, Zea-Bermúdez wrote the prologue for the work of her fellow townsman, Julián Escudero Picazo, Vidas manchegas (Manchegan Lives).

She died in Madrid on 21 August 1936.

== Selected works ==
- Compendio de la doctrina cristiana para el uso del apostolado de las doctrinas (1903)
- Influencia de la mujer en la regeneración social de los católicos (1904)
- Post Núbila: sobre la verdadera cuna de Cervantes (1916)
