= Communications-enabled application =

A communications enabled application (CEA) is a set of information technology (IT) components and communication technology components that are integrated using a particular service-oriented architecture (SOA) to increase the productivity of an organization and/or improve the quality of users' experiences.

Communication enablement adds real-time networking functionality to an IT application. Providing communications capability to an IT application:

- removes the human latency which exists when (i) making sense of information from many different sources, (ii) orchestrating suitable responses to events, and (iii) keeping track of actions carried out when responding to information received;
- enables users to be part of the creative flow of content and processes.

What distinguishes a CEA from other software applications is its intrinsic reliance upon communications technologies to accomplish its objectives. A CEA depends on real-time networking capabilities together with such network oriented functions as location, presence, proximity, and identity.

Another distinguishing characteristic of a CEA is the implicit assumption that network services will be available as callable services within the SOA frameworks from which the CEA is constructed. To provide callable services, the network services which are available today must be made virtual and component-like.

CEAs apply to business processes as well as instances where no obvious business process which requires improvement exists (e.g., games, entertainment video). CEAs that apply to business processes are referred to as communications enabled business processes or communications enabled business solutions.

== Importance ==
CEA are important for at least four reasons:

1. The convergence of (i) CEA, (ii) broadband and (iii) millions of different devices connected to the network is expected to significantly affect the communications industry.
2. CEA introduce a fundamental change in the way that information communications technology (ICT) applications and services are designed, developed, delivered, and used. To date, SOA has focused on building IT applications only and the network has been mostly deemed to be a transport pipe. CEA incorporate communications capability into any application. This requires that network services must be made virtual and component-like as well as callable within a SOA framework. CEA implementation entails a significant reorganization of present network management functionality.
3. CEA bring together the richness of IT applications with the sophistication and intelligence of communications networks. This enables greater customization, greater simplification of interactions, and automatic adaptation to users' environments and preferences.
4. Making network components from multiple vendors work in a mashup will be a major challenge. The service level agreements (SLAs) for these mashups will be difficult to define and deliver upon.

== Examples ==
- Secure services such as messaging, voice, conference call, authentication and inbound short message service can be included into an IT application for the purpose of delivering a customized solution in hours or days at a fraction of the cost of large packaged applications or custom development projects.
- Patients can be discharged more quickly because the patient care application used by authorizing medical personnel can reach out to the discharge application, wherever they are.
- A new policy is processed and approved more quickly because the client’s insurance agent initiates real-time communications with people who have reviewed the policy and are required to approve it.
- Faster and more effective emergency response is provided because the first responder application recognized the availability and location of key resources.
- An industrial customer problem is resolved more quickly because the project management application scheduled the earliest possible conference call with all key available stakeholders and delivered all relevant information to them.
- A data center backup package that runs overnight must be complete by 8 a.m. when the network turns back to daytime operations. The application recognizes that it will not complete in time - so it makes a request of the network for more capacity. The network can apply logic to translate the request into a set of commands to the various nodes to do whatever is required for the task to be completed by 8 a.m. (e.g., change the priority, provision more capacity, allocate more wavelengths).
