= Jaime Zea =

Peruvian mayor (born 1960)

Jaime Zea (born in Huyro, La Convención, Cuzco, 17 February 1960) was the mayor of Villa El Salvador, one of the most populated districts of Lima, Peru. He was elected as mayor in 2003 and was reelected in 2007.
