= Maddie Gardner =

American sports broadcaster (born 1993)

- Born: Mary Maddison Gardner; July 13, 1993 (age 33); Mount Airy, North Carolina, U.S.
- Education: Mount Airy High School; University of North Carolina at Chapel Hill
- Occupation: Sports broadcaster
- Spouse: Griffin Parker

Mary Maddison "Maddie" Gardner (born July 13, 1993) is an American news reporter and internationally recognized former Allstar Cheerleader. She was the point (center) flyer for the Senior Large All Girl Level 5 competitive cheerleading team Senior Elite of the Cheer Extreme Allstars from 2006-2012, winning a gold medal at the Cheerleading Worlds in 2010 and 2012.

== Personal life ==
As a child, Gardner began dance and cheerleading lessons. She began her competitive cheerleading career with the Pro Spirit Dazzlers. At age seven she began competing with the Cheer Extreme Allstars in Kernersville and in Mount Airy, North Carolina; this was also the age that she was first coached by Courtney Smith-Pope. She attended Mount Airy High School in Mount Airy, North Carolina, where she was an honor student and an active participant in the school's student government, Interact Service Club, and cheerleading team. Gardner became captain of her school's cheerleading team in her sophomore year. Gardner chose to attend the University of North Carolina at Chapel Hill, where she was a Tar Heel cheerleader and a sister of Zeta Tau Alpha, majoring in journalism.

== Career ==
Gardner has made numerous media appearances around the globe as a speaker, celebrity judge, and stunt instructor. Between Worlds 2009 and 2010, Gardner was chosen as Inside Cheerleading Magazine's December cover girl and was also the single most featured cheerleader for the magazine as evidenced by large banners with her face at booths around the USA. In 2011, CNN followed Cheer Extreme's level five Large Senior All-Girl team Senior Elite as they prepared for Worlds 2011, featuring Gardner and the rest of her team. On March 1, 2012, Gardner debuted a line for Fancy Face Cosmetics, a cheerleading makeup company with products designed to be sweat proof. The Maddie Loves Shimmer collection included three of Gardner's favorite shimmer colors and favorite lipstick. Each collection came with an autographed picture, makeup bag, and tote bag. Shortly after Worlds 2012, Gardner made the covers of The Cheerleading Magazine and Inside Cheerleading Magazine.

== Media appearances ==
Gardner was chosen as one of "Cheer Channel's Superstars of All Stars." Alongside her were other nationally recognized all star cheerleaders including Kiara Nowlin, Apple Graceffa, Gabi Butler, Whitney Love, Kelsey Rule, Cami Branson, Erica Englebert, and junior newcomer to the all star scene, Bianca Treger. As part of the elite group, they appeared as guest stars in the spirit industry's very first web series, Secret Diary of an American Cheerleader produced by the Cheer Channel. The show aired on the Cheer Channel Online Network as well as YouTube on May 28, 2012 and starred actress, Neva McIntosh in the role of Emma Franklin. The show aired on the Cheer Channel's cable block on Southern California's channel 64 on September 9, 2012.
