= Cea (surname) =

Cea is a surname. Notable people with the surname include:

- Edmundo B. Cea (1911–1993), Filipino politician
- Eusebio Rodolfo Cordón Cea (1899–1966), provisional president of El Salvador in 1962
- Francisco Cea Bermúdez (1779–1850), Spanish politician and prime minister
- Jean Céa (born 1932), French mathematician
- José Pedro Cea (1900–1970), Uruguayan footballer
- José Roberto Cea (born 1939), Salvadoran novelist and poet
- Ricardo Mella Cea (1861–1925), Spanish writer, intellectual and anarchist activist
- Severo Cea (fl. 1913–1935), Filipino politician

== See also ==
- Zea (surname)
