= Correctional Education Association =

Nonprofit prison education organization

The Correctional Education Association (CEA) was founded in 1930 to provide educational services in correctional settings. This non-profit professional association is the largest affiliate of the American Correctional Association.

== Purpose and goals ==
The Correctional Education Association is the professional organization for educators who work in adult correctional and juvenile justice facilities internationally. Although based in the United States, where most of its members work, it has made advances in encouraging members from outside the US to become active members from outside the US to become active members of the organization. The CEA provides services to its members including: a peer-reviewed international journal, a quarterly newsletter, annual membership and resource directory, an accreditation system for prison, jail, and juvenile school programs, a website and listserves for its special interest groups, and under-graduate and graduate online courses for educators.

== History ==
Austin MacCormick wrote a book based on the results of his 1928 nationwide survey of prison education (later published in 1931 as a book entitled The Education of Adult Prisoners: A Survey and a Program). MacCormick was influenced by Thomas Mott Osborne as evidenced by the dedication of his book.

MacCormick was Assistant Director of the U.S. Bureau of Prisons, organized in 1930 a standing committee on education within the American Prison Association (now the American Correctional Association). The Standing Committee on Education published its first journal from 1937 to 1940 entitled Correctional Education. In 1945, the Standing Committee on Education organized the Correctional Education Association (CEA) at the 76th Congress of the American Prison Association. In 1946, CEA was formally recognized with Price Chenault elected as the first President. In 1949, The Journal of Correctional Education was reestablished with Chester D. Owens as editor. In 1981, the CEA hired its first Executive Director, Osa Coffey, and established a national office.

In 1986 CEA moved its national office to Maryland from Washington, DC, where it remains today. The current address (October 2015) is 12625 Laurel Bowie Road #3430, Laurel, MD 20709. The Acting Executive Director is Morris Dews and the Administrative Assistant is Kiara Wilson.

== Organization ==
CEA is divided into eight regions encompassing both the United States and Canada. There are two international representative seats open on the Executive Board of the CEA. There is one representative for Canada and one for the Rest of the World. The International Representatives relay the issues and subjects of concern from international members to the Executive Board at regular meetings.

There are numerous state and provincial chapters. These regions and state/provincial chapters host annual conferences and training seminars. The International CEA has an annual traveling summer conference and hosts an annual Spring Forum. The annual International conferences offer members an opportunity to exchange ideas with correctional and prison educators from around the world and dialogue about the experience of teaching in a unique pedagogical setting. Each year the Journal of Correctional Education devotes a special issue to a different subject. The June 2007 issue of the Journal was devoted to international issues in correctional education with contributions from other countries including Ireland and Israel.

The CEA is the largest professional organization dedicated to the mission of education for those students in the Adult and Juvenile Criminal Justice Systems. There are over 1300 members of CEA.

== Standards Commission ==
The most current versions of the CEA Standards are listed below:

- Performance Standards for Correctional Education Programs in Adult Institutions, July 2016
- Performance Standards for Correctional Education Programs in Juvenile Institutions, July 2010
- Performance Standards for Correctional Education Programs in Jails and Detention Centers, July 2016

== See also ==
- Prison education
