= Noelle Salazar =

American author

Noelle Salazar is an American author of historical fiction.

== Career ==
Salazar joined the United States Navy when she was 18, but she was discharged due to a previous injury. She worked as an National Football League cheerleader for three years.

The Flight Girls (2019), her debut novel, was a Publishers Weekly bestseller and an Apple Books bestseller. A BookTrib review noted, "The physical and psychological destruction of war that Noelle Salazar depicts following the events at Pearl Harbor in The Flight Girls is the raw, evocative story that brings a new perspective to the harrowing yet inspirational stories of World War II". It received a critical review from Publishers Weekly, which praised the camaraderie of her characters but stated, "this novel can’t quite get itself off the ground". Kirkus Reviews similarly assessed, "Though it has a lot of heart, this novel bites off more than it can chew".

Her second novel, Angels of the Resistance, was published in 2022. It received a review in Library Journal that praised character development, though Salazar's research into small details was criticized.

She lives in the Pacific Northwest.

== Works ==
- The Flight Girls. Harlequin MIRA. 2019. ISBN 978-0-7783-6922-6.
- Angels of the Resistance. MIRA. 2022. ISBN 978-0-7783-8679-7.
