= Carolina Panthers Cheerleaders =

Cheerleading squad of the Carolina Panthers

The NFL Carolina Panthers Cheerleaders are known as the TopCats. They were founded in 1996 by Leslie Stephenson Matz, they revealed their inaugural squad of 35 members, their original logo and their name on July 10, 1996 at Ericsson Stadium in Charlotte, NC. The original choreographer was Kimberly Pixton Horner, and the Cheer Assistant was Leigh Christi Smith.

== The 1996–1997 TopCats Cheerleaders Inaugural Squad ==
- Tina Adamczak
- Tara Ballard
- Tammy Baqui
- Regina Beasley
- Anne-Marie Bozzacco
- Pam Burks
- Jewel Butler
- Amy Coleman
- Lenee' Cook
- Julie Cox
- Tracy Day
- Michele Dearing
- Tina Dietrich (Becker)
- Jennifer Ellis
- Denis Graham
- Felicia Grant
- Shelley Graves
- Stephanie Hilton
- Allison Hustad
- Lori Knox
- Ella Lee
- Melissa Morrison
- Regina Polk
- Nicole Price
- Janelle Rayford
- Julie Roberts
- Melanie Rogers
- Leigh Ann Spence
- Joetta Talford
- Vicki Tharrington
- Arinn Walters
- Ellen Watson
- Lisa Weekly
- Cyndi Wells

== History ==
Over 400 women auditioned for the Carolina Panthers Cheerleading squad in 1996 at Winthrop Coliseum in Rock Hill, SC. The after the initial cuts, the final 64 auditioned on April 2, 1996 in Charlotte, NC at the Carillon Tower in Charlotte, NC, the site of the original administrative offices of the Carolina Panthers football team.

=== 1996–1997 Calendar ===
The Carolina Panthers wanted their first year's calendar to be rated "PG," according to Director of Special Events & Cheerleading, Leslie Matz. They chose to showcase the cheerleaders in the stadium in their uniforms, in suits and without any bathing suits. Tina Adamczak, a former Buffalo Bills cheerleader, graced the cover of the calendar wearing the team's uniform, while sitting in the center of the practice field.
