= Mount Airy High School =

American public school in North Carolina

Location
- 1011 N South Street; Mount Airy, North Carolina 27030; United States
- Coordinates: 36°30′42″N 80°36′57″W

Information
- School type: Public
- Established: 1895 (131 years ago)
- School district: Mount Airy School District
- CEEB code: 342780
- Principal: Jason Dorsett
- Staff: 36.62 (FTE)
- Grades: 9–12
- Enrollment: 620 (2023-2024)
- Student to teacher ratio: 16.93
- Colors: Navy and white
- Team name: Granite Bears
- Website: www.mahsbears.org

Mount Airy High School is located on N South Street in Mount Airy, North Carolina. The front office is at the corner of N South Street and Orchard Street. The school first opened in 1895. Mount Airy's team name is the Granite Bears, and their school colors are navy blue and white.

== Notable alumni ==
- Daniel "Chipp" Bailey – former Sheriff of Mecklenburg County, North Carolina
- Bill Cox – NFL player
- Chubby Dean – MLB pitcher and first baseman
- Donna Fargo – country singer-songwriter
- Maddie Gardner – American news reporter and internationally recognized cheerleader
- Andy Griffith – actor and comedian; played the lead role of Andy Taylor in the sitcom The Andy Griffith Show
- Luke Lambert – crew chief in the NASCAR Cup Series
- Alex Sink – former chief financial officer for the state of Florida and treasurer on the board of trustees of the Florida State Board of Administration
- Sarah Stevens – member of the North Carolina General Assembly
- Anna Wood – film, stage, and television actress
