= Cheer Extreme Allstars =

American all-star cheerleading program

Cheer Extreme
- Sport: Cheerleading and competition dance
- Founded: 1993
- Based in: North Carolina
- Colors: Teal, Black, and White
- Owner: Courtney Smith Pope, Ben Pope
- Head coaches: Courtney Smith-Pope
- No. of teams: 11 locations in North Carolina, South Carolina, Virginia, Illinois and Maryland with over 110 teams (2019-2020)

Cheer Extreme Allstars is a branch of cheerleading and competition dance gyms found throughout North Carolina, South Carolina, Maryland, Illinois, Florida and Virginia. Cheer Extreme is best known for its level six (or "Worlds") teams, which have won numerous titles at the Cheerleading Worlds. Cheer Extreme Senior Elite, of the Kernersville, NC, location, finished in first place at the Cheerleading Worlds in 2010, 2012, 2013, 2023, 2025, and 2026; Cheer Extreme SSX (also known as Small Senior X) of the Raleigh, NC, location finished in first place in 2016, 2018, 2019, 2021, 2024, 2025, and 2026; and Cheer Extreme Code Black, also of Raleigh, finished in first place in 2019, 2024, 2025, and 2026. As a franchise, Cheer Extreme has won over 850 National Champion titles.

In 2009, an owner and coach Courtney Smith-Pope, who was a cheerleader for Wake Forest University, won Coach of The Year sponsored by the USASF. In 2013, Cheer Extreme opened a location in Roanoke, Virginia. In 2015, Cheer Extreme opened a location in Waldorf, Maryland. In 2022, they opened a new location in Boynton Beach, Florida. The two most notable locations are in Kernersville, NC and Raleigh, NC. Courtney Smith-Pope is the owner of the Kernersville location and her sister Kelly Helton owns the Raleigh location. CEA was originally opened by Betsy Smith before ownership was passed down to her daughters.

== Publicity ==
Cheer Extreme Senior Elite was invited to a private audition in Charlotte, North Carolina, for the reality television show America's Got Talent, but did not make it on the actual televised show. They have also been featured in Inside Cheerleading Magazine. In 2011, CNN featured specials on Cheer Extreme's Senior Elite and SSX teams while they made their way to the 2011 Cheerleading World Championships. In the making is a documentary that is reportedly following them through the 2012–2017 seasons.

== Notable athletes ==
- Maddie Gardner, news reporter

== Teams ==
Level 1 Teams	Division	Location
Tiny Turtles	Tiny 1	Raleigh
Baby Sharks	Tiny 1	Raleigh
Shine	Mini 1	Raleigh
Junior Black	Junior 1	Raleigh
Lovespell	U16 1	Raleigh

Level 2 Teams	Division	Location
Mini Elite	Mini 2	Kernesville
Mini Mingos	Mini 2	Raleigh
Frostbites	Youth 2	Kernersville
Shimmer	Youth 2	Raleigh
Mermaids	Youth 2	Raleigh
Storm	Youth 2	Florida
Angels	Junior 2	Raleigh
Twisters	Junior 2	Florida
Teal Force	Junior 2	Maryland
Glam Squad	Small Junior 2	Chicago
Senioritas	Senior 2	Raleigh

Level 3 Teams	Division	Location
Tsunami	Youth 3	Florida
Lady Pearls	Youth 3	Maryland
Junior X	Junior 3	Kernersville
Ice Queens	Junior 3	Raleigh
Glamour Queens	U16 3	Maryland
Senior 3lite	Senior 3	Raleigh
Smack	U18 3	Kernersville
Ice	Senior Coed 3	Maryland

Level 4 Teams	Division	Location
Youth X	Youth 4	Raleigh
Legends	Junior 4	Kernersville
Juicy	U16 4	Raleigh
Vengeance	Junior 4	Florida
CRUSH	U18 Coed 4	Chicago
Legacy	Small Senior 4	Kernersville
C4 Bombsquad	Medium Senior Coed 4	Kernersville
Berries	Medium Senior Coed 4	Raleigh
Halo	Medium Senior 4	Maryland
ENVY	Open Coed 4	Chicago
O4	International Open Coed 4	Kernersville

Level 4.2 Teams	Division	Location
Spotlight	Small Senior Coed 4.2	Kernersville
Lady Venom	Senior 4.2	Raleigh
Lightning	Senior 4.2	Florida

Level 5 Teams	Division	Location
Youth Elite	Youth 5	Kernersville
Crush	Youth 5	Florida
SJX	Junior 5	Raleigh
Chaos	Junior Coed 5	Florida
Vixens	Senior 5	Kernersville
Medu5a	Senior 5	Raleigh
Lady X	Senior 5	Florida

Level 6 Teams	Division	Location
Crush	Large Junior 6	Kernersville
Heist	Extra Small Senior Coed 6	DMV
SMOEX	Extra Small Senior Coed 6	Raleigh
XSS TropiX	Extra Small Senior 6	Raleigh
Hail	Extra Small Senior 6	Sanford
Jaws	Extra Small Senior 6	Odenton
SSX	Small Senior 6	Raleigh
Passion	Small Senior Coed 6	Chicago
Vixens	Medium Senior 6	Kernersville
Senior Elite	Large Senior 6	Kernersville
Coex	U18 Non-Tumbling Coed 6	Kernersville
Cobra Coed	U18 Non-Tumbling Coed 6	Raleigh
Cougars	U18 Non-Tumbling 6	Raleigh
Gossip Girls	U18 Non-Tumbling 6	Maryland
Sea Queens	U18 Non-Tumbling 6	Odenton
Hiss	International Open Small Coed 6	Raleigh
Code Black	International Open Non-Tumbling Coed 6	Raleigh
Lady Lux	International Open Non-Tumbling 6	Kernersville

Level 7 Teams	Division	Location
Exorcis7	International Open Non-Tumbling Coed 7	Raleigh
Kraken	International Open Non-Tumbling 7	Odenton
Super 7	International Open Non-Tumbling 7	DMV
