= Petroleum in Uruguay =

Uruguay is a petroleum importing country, and most of the industry is controlled by the state-owned company ANCAP. ANCAP operates both the only refinery in Uruguay, La Teja Refinery, and the distribution of gas within the country.

In 2025, the government authorised projects submitted by seismic exploration companies on Uruguay's offshore platform. Environmental NGOs oppose these projects and are taking legal action to prevent their implementation, considering them harmful to the environment.

== History ==
For decades, Uruguay has been searching for petroleum reserves on its territory. One of the first such attempts was in 1957, when ANCAP drilled in the north of the country.

In 2012, Uruguay engaged on a bidding process for the exploration of hydrocarbons. The following companies are interested: BP, BG Group, Total S.A., Bahamas Petroleum Company and Tullow Oil. Exploration efforts were made in offshore platforms, with an investment of over $1.6 billion in 3 years.

In 2025, the government authorised projects submitted by seismic exploration companies on Uruguay's offshore platform. Environmental NGOs oppose these projects and are taking legal action to prevent their implementation, considering them harmful to the environment.

== Issues ==
=== Leaded gasoline ===
Leaded gasoline was phased out in the country in 2003.

== La Teja Refinery ==
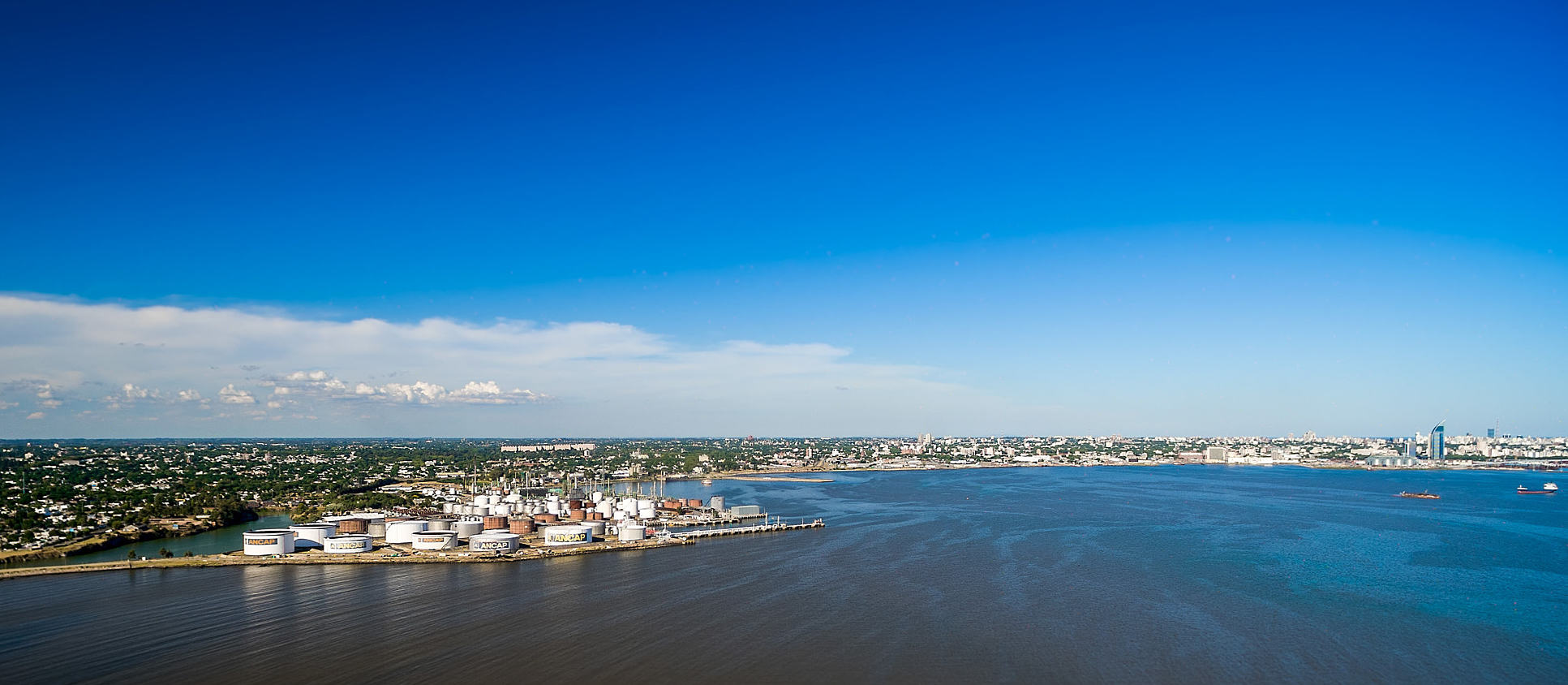
La Teja Refinery (right) with La Teja neighborhood inland and the main city of Montevideo on the right.

The La Teja Refinery is the only oil refinery in Uruguay, and is located in the La Teja neighborhood in Montevideo. Owned by the national industry ANCAP, the refinery primarily produces light-grade oil products used for domestic industries. The refinery is connected to an oil terminal in the Port of Montevideo.

The refinery was first operated in 1937, and currently has a total capacity of approximately 50,000 barrels a day. As of 2022, two-thirds of Uruguay's petroleum imports come from the United States, with a further 18% from neighboring Brazil.
