= Pablo Landeo Muñoz =

Peruvian Quechua writer

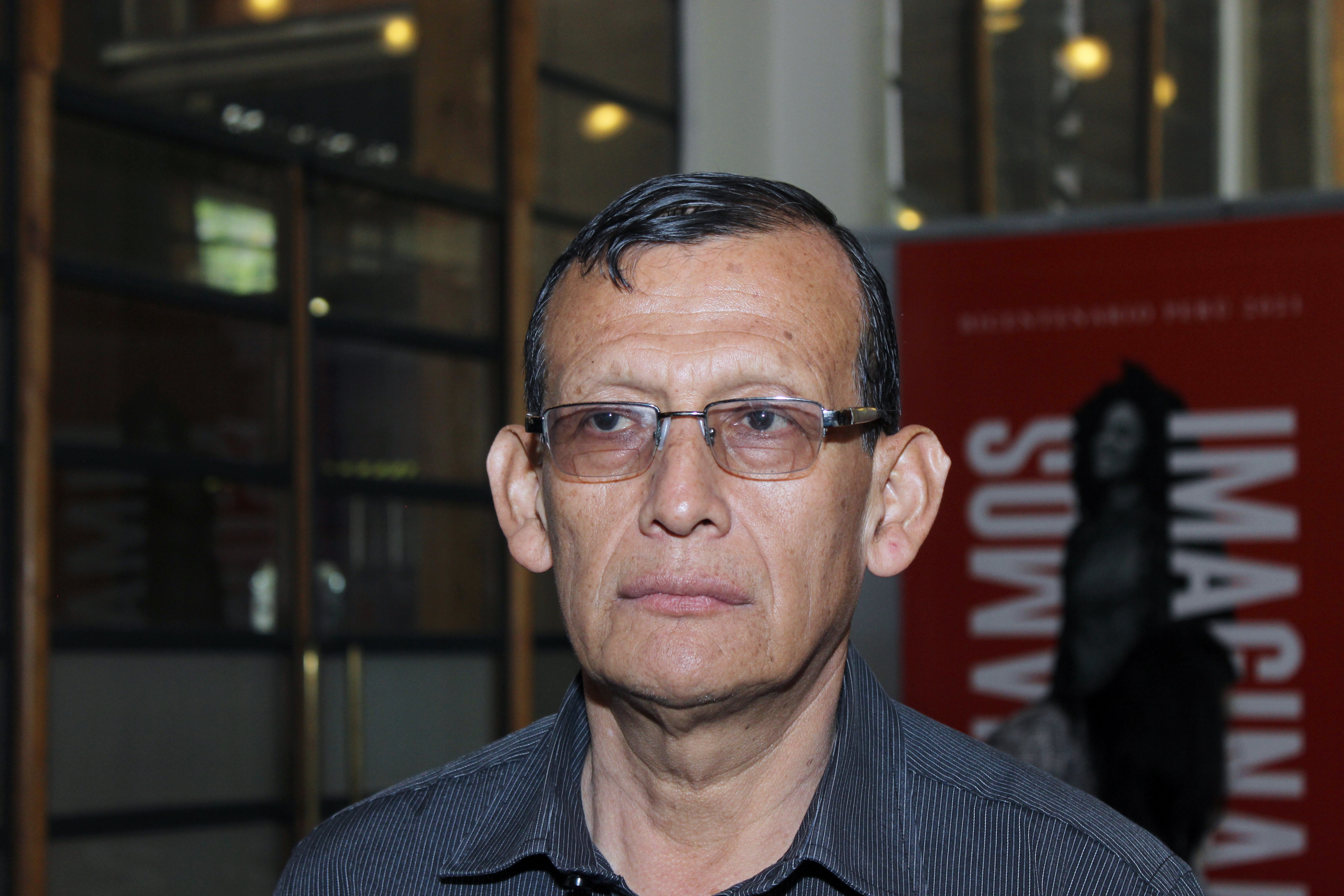
- Born: 1959 (age 66–67); Huancavelica, Peru
- Education: San Marcos University, Lima
- Occupation: Writer
- Writing career
- Language: Quechua, Spanish
- Years active: 2011–present
- Genres: Poetry, non-fiction
- Notable work: Aqupampa (2016)
- Notable awards: Peru's National Prize of Literature

Pablo Landeo Muñoz (born 1959) is a Peruvian writer, translator and teacher of language and literature. His literary works are written in Quechua and Spanish.

== Education and career ==
Pablo Landeo Muñoz studied literature at Peru's National University of San Marcos in Lima, where he got his Bachelor's and Master's degrees. Currently he is completing graduate studies at Paris's INALCO where he also teaches Quechua language and culture. In 2019 he was the writer in residence at the Quechua program of the University of Pennsylvania in Philadelphia, where he offered talks on Quechua literature.

Landeo-Muñoz is the director of the literary magazine Atuqpa Chupan ("The fox's tail" in Quechua), which is published annually and written entirely in Quechua.

== Literary works ==
In 2011 he published the book Los hijos de Babel in Spanish. In 2013 he published a collection of stories from Huancavelica in Quechua Ayacucho under the title Wankawillka, complemented by translations into Spanish and a study in Quechua.

=== Peru's National Prize of Literature ===
In 2016 Landeo-Muñoz published the novel Aqupampa, considered the first major novel written in Quechua without a Spanish translation. In 2018 the novel was awarded Peru's National Prize of Literature, Category of Indigenous Languages. The novel describes stories of rural migration to Peru's capital, Pueblos jóvenes, and the violence of the Shining Path in the 20th Century.

== Bibliography ==
=== Research publications ===
- 2014: Categorías andinas para una aproximación al willakuy. Umallanchikpi kaqkuna. Asamblea Nacional de Rectores, Lima. (Masters thesis)

=== Poetry in Spanish ===
- 2011: Los hijos de babel. Perú Grupo Pakarina, Lima

=== Short stories in Quechua ===
- 2013: Wankawillka. Hanaqpacha ayllukunapa willakuynin. Perú Grupo Pakarina, Lima

=== Novel in Quechua ===
- 2016: Aqupampa. Perú Grupo Pakarina, Instituto Francés de Estudios Andinos, Lima. 106 pages. ISBN 9786124297090
