= Squatting in Uruguay =

Occupation of unused land or derelict buildings in Uruguay

Squatting in Uruguay is the occupation of unused or derelict buildings or land without the permission of the owner. In the nineteenth century, pueblos de ratas (rat villages) developed when gauchos were forced to settle by the rural enclosures for cattle farming. In the early twentieth century, European migrant workers lived in conventillos (tenement slums).

== History ==
The first cantegril land invasions came in Montevideo, the capital of Uruguay, in the 1940s. The name was a joke, referring to the Cantegril Country Club, which was built in 1947 at the most exclusive Uruguayan beach resort, Punta del Este. A documentary about the phenomenon was produced in 1958, called Cantegriles. Whilst cantegril first referred to all squatter settlements, now it only denotes shanty towns and other informal settlements are known as asentamiento irregulares. As the settlements legalize, they receive help from groups such as FUCVAM (Uruguayan Federation of Mutual Aid Housing Cooperatives) and the slum upgrading program, PMB-PIAI.

By 2006, around 140,000 people were living in asentamiento irregulares in Montevideo, making up 11% of the city's population. Land invasions peaked in terms of numbers and planning in the 1990s and since then have declined, although already existing settlements continued to grow. There also people squatting in slums, for example 60 families occupied the former Inlasa smelting factory in La Teja and then complained in 2004 about lead poisoning.

La Solidaria was an anarchist self-managed social centre, squatted on Avenida Daniel Fernández Crespo y Cerro Largo in Montevideo in 2012. The project was run by assembly and hosted a cafe, a radio station and the Tierra Purpúrea library. It was evicted in 2017 and subsequently some of the occupiers were charged with damages because they had removed doors, windows and floorboards.
