= Cantegril =

Shanty towns in Uruguay

Cantegril is the name given in Uruguay to a shanty town, such as those surrounding its cities including the capital Montevideo. It is equivalent to Brazil's favela and Peru's pueblos jóvenes. Although the term carries this meaning, Cantegril is also the name of a neighborhood in Punta del Este, which has developed considerably over the years.

Many of the settlements in Uruguay are on land subject to industrial contamination, such as in La Teja and around waterways like the Cańada Alaska in Montevideo.

According to 2007 census data, about 6% of the total Uruguayan population (174,393 people) lived in cantegriles. A documentary about the phenomenon was produced in 1958, called Cantegriles. Whilst cantegril first referred to all squatter settlements, now it only denotes shanty towns; other informal settlements are known as asentamientos irregulares.

The term is an ironic reference to Cantegril, one of the most expensive neighbourhoods of the seaside resort Punta del Este. The word cantegril originates from cante gril in Provenzal Occitan, meaning cricket sings. Its modern use might derive from the 1921 novel of the same name by Raymond Escholier.

== See also ==
- Squatting in Uruguay
- Padre Cacho
