= La Teja =

- Barrio
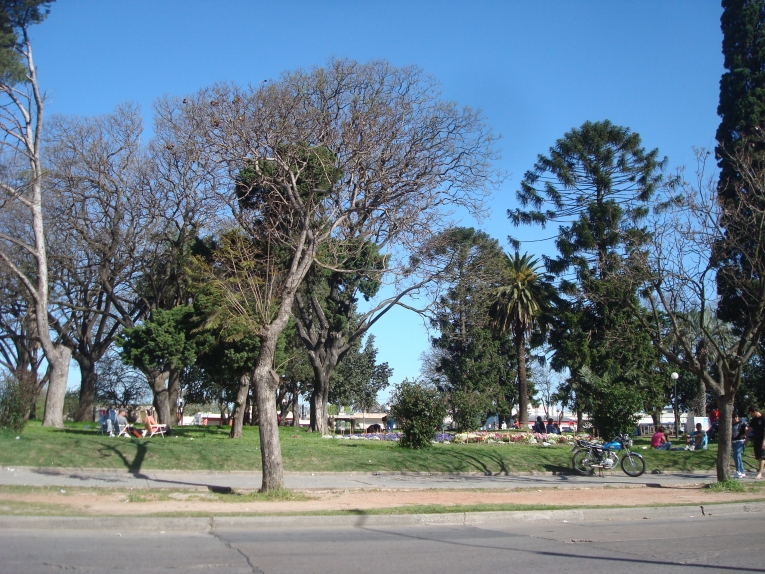
- Plaza Lafone in La Teja

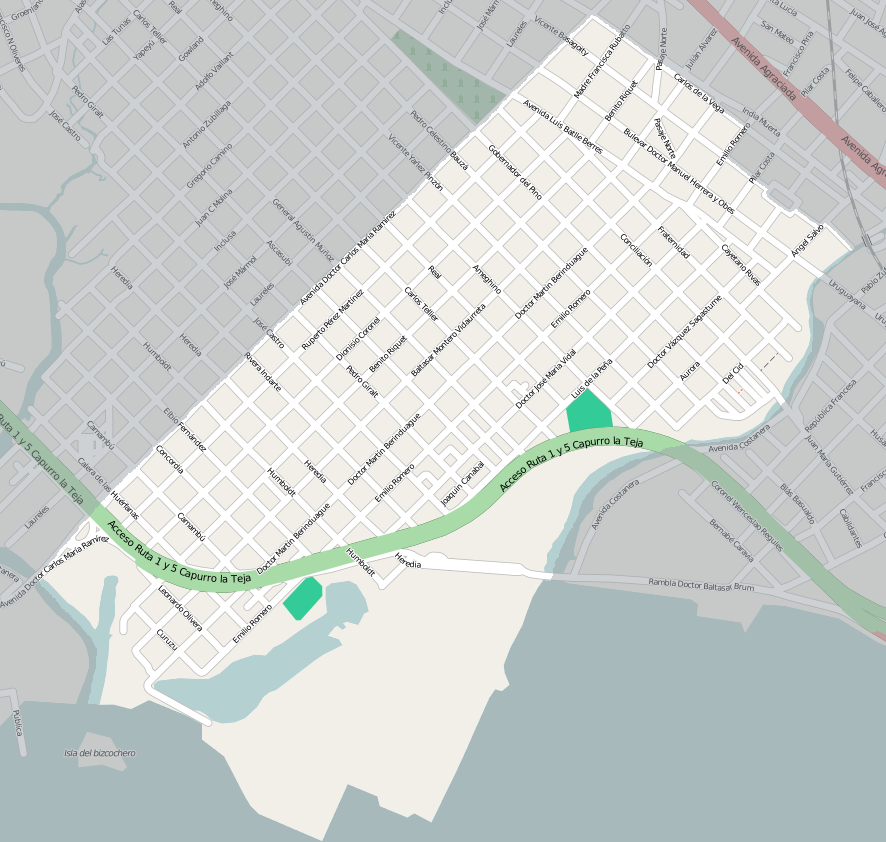
- Street map of La Teja

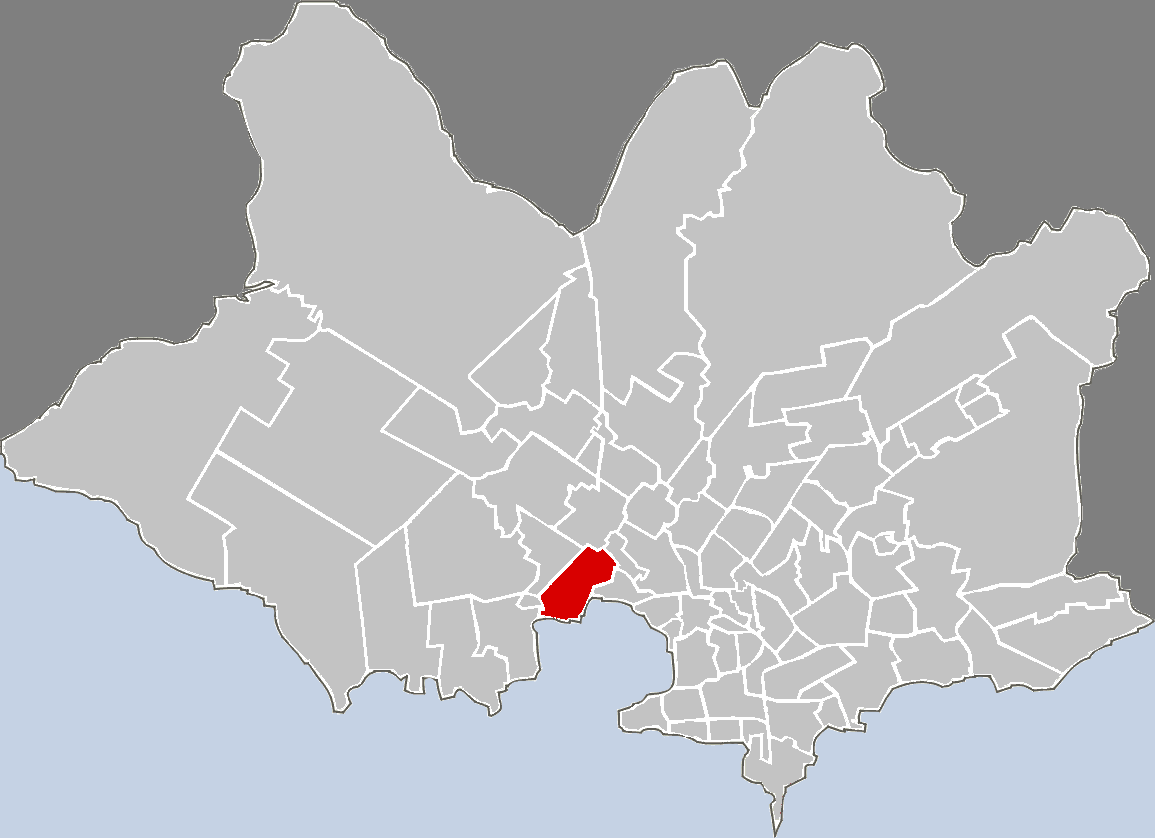
- Location of La Teja in Montevideo
- Coordinates: 34°51′51″S 56°13′31″W
- Country: Uruguay
- Department: Montevideo Department
- City: Montevideo

La Teja is a barrio (neighbourhood or district) of Montevideo, Uruguay. The neighborhood has a mix of residential and industrial properties, mostly occupied by working class communities, including with a number of informal settlements built on former industrial sites.

The barrio is notable for its high concentration of industrial sites, including the La Teja Refinery, that have spawned a local environmental justice activism community. In particular, high concentrations of lead contamination led to national policy and attention.

== Name ==
The neighborhood was established on September 12, 1842, as Pueblo Victoria, named after then-Queen of England, Queen Victoria. However, the community eventually became known as La Teja. Two competing theories are available for the change in name: it either refers to the distinctive clay tiles (tejas) used in the early architecture of the neighborhood or to the slave quarters in the area leading to a large population of enslaved men referred to by the tiles they made.

== Location ==
It shares borders with Tres Ombúes to the north west, Belvedere to the north, El Prado / Nueva Savona barrio to the north east, Capurro to the south east and borders the Bay of Montevideo to the south. To the west of its southern part it borders the Pantanoso Creek, across which starts the Villa del Cerro.

In La Teja is located the Cementerio de La Teja, Montevideo.

== History ==
Before being recognized as a town, Jesuits and Spanish, Italian and Basque immigrants had created communities in the area that would become La Teja. Buying Jesuit land, the British entrepreneur Samuel Fisher Lafone created a meat curing plant in the area, and with the help of the city planned 122 city blocks in the area. The neighborhood was established on September 12, 1842, as Pueblo Victoria, naming it after the then Queen of England Queen Victoria.

The neighborhood later grew during the early 21st century waves of European immigrants to Uruguay. These communities created an industrial working-class neighborhood strongly identified with militancy and solidarity found in urban politics in the region. The Civic-military dictatorship of Uruguay targeted local leaders in the neighborhood during its repression of dissent.

During the industrial period led by Import substitution industrialization policies, the neighborhood grew during the 1970s and 80s as workers moved into the neighborhood to be near factories. As workers built up housing in the area, the native marsh was frequently backfilled with industrial and construction waste that was easily available. Both formal and informal settlements in the neighborhood were built on reclaimed, and sometimes contaminated, industrial sites.

In the early 2000s, several local children were identified to have high lead exposure. After investigation, doctors and public health officials discovered broad contamination of the community. In response, the community formed what anthropologist Daniel Renfrew called "the first environmental justice movement in Uruguay", embodied in the organization Comisión Vivir sin Plomo (Commission for a Life Without Lead). The group was led by Carlos Pilo, a local militant community organizer. The campaign led by the community resulted in a widespread public health awareness of lead contamination and eventual regulation in the country.

== Economy ==
=== Refinery ===
The La Teja Refinery is the only oil refinery in Uruguay, and is located in the La Teja neighborhood in Montevideo. Owned by the national industry ANCAP, the refinery primarily produces light-grade oil products used for domestic industries. The refinery is connected to an oil terminal in the Port of Montevideo.

The refinery was first operated in 1937, and currently has a total capacity of approximately 50,000 barrels a day. As of 2022, two-thirds of Uruguay's petroleum imports come from the United States, with a further 18% from neighboring Brazil.

== Institutions ==
=== Places of worship ===
- Parish Church of the Holy Family, Av. Carlos María Ramirez 677 (Roman Catholic)

=== Radio stations ===
- El Puente FM

== See also ==
- Barrios of Montevideo
- Samuel Fisher Lafone
