= 2003 Uruguayan ANCAP referendum =

7 December 2003
- Repeal of Law 17,448

Results
Choice	Votes	%
Yes	1,201,626	63.72%
No	684,129	36.28%
Valid votes	1,885,755	91.67%
Invalid or blank votes	171,394	8.33%
Total votes	2,057,149	100.00%
Registered voters/turnout	2,466,680	83.4%

A referendum on repealing the law that abolished the petroleum monopoly held by ANCAP was held in Uruguay on 7 December 2003. The proposal was approved by 64% of voters.

== Background ==
On 27 December 2001 the General Assembly passed law 17,448, abolishing the monopoly held by state-owned petroleum company ANCAP. The Broad Front collected 685,294 signatures against the law. A quorum of 25% of registered voters (607,301) was required to force a referendum. On 25 July the Electoral Court validated 662,675 of the collected signatures, and on 18 August fixed a date for the referendum.

== Results ==
Choice	Votes	%
For	1,201,626	63.72
Against	684,129	36.28
Unasessed votes	38,010	–
Invalid/blank votes	133,384	–
Total	2,057,149	100
Registered voters/turnout	2,466,680	83.40
Source: Direct Democracy

Unassessed votes were those cast by voters away from their local polling station. These would have been counted after their right to vote had been examined, but as the result was not in doubt, the Electoral Court waived the count.
