= Rubén Isidro Alonso =

Uruguayan Roman Catholic priest

Ruben Isidro Alonso, popularly known as "Padre Cacho", (1929–1992) was a Uruguayan Roman Catholic priest.

Alonso was born in Montevideo. A famous streetwise priest, he worked with the poorest people in Uruguay, residing with them in the cantegriles. In 2014, the Uruguayan archbishop Daniel Sturla asked the Pope for the beatification of Alonso.
