= Raymond Escholier =

French journalist, novelist and art critic

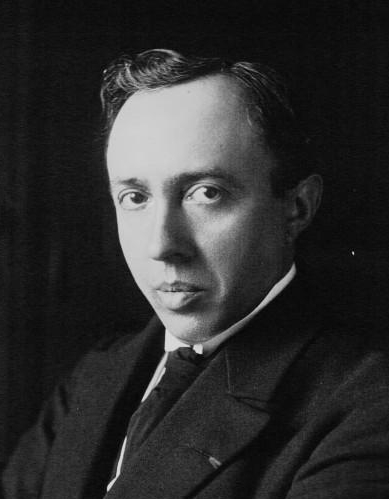
- Raymond Escholier in 1923
- Born: Raymond-Antoine-Marie-Emmanuel Escolier; 25 December 1882; Paris
- Died: 19 September 1971 (aged 88); Nîmes
- Occupations: Novelist; Essayist; Poet; Curator

Raymond Escholier, real name Raymond-Antoine-Marie-Emmanuel Escolier, (25 December 1882 – 19 September 1971) was a French journalist, novelist and art critic. He was curator of the Maison de Victor Hugo and of the Petit Palais.

== Bibliography ==
Novels and short stories

- 1924: Le Sel de la terre, Éditions Malfère
- 1925: Quand on conspire, Éditions Grasset
- 1928: Mahmadou Fofana, Crès
- 1930: L’Empereur aux yeux bleus, Albin Michel, in collaboration with Clément Vautel
- 1931: L'herbe d'amour, Albin Michel, 1931.
- 1933: Sang Gitane, Laboratoire Deglaude, 1933.
- 1935: Maripepa, Albin Michel, 1935.

Theatre

- 1908: Madame de Luzy, one-act play, after a short story by Anatole France
- 1931: La Conversion de Figaro, 3 acts and one epilogue, 1931, in collaboration with Jean-Jacques Brousson
- 1931: Cantegril, four-act opéra comique, 1931, music by Jean Roger-Ducasse
- 1974: Goya, three-act opera, music by Tony Aubin

Essays

- 1909: Vers l’autre rive, Messein
- 1913: Essais d’art, de littérature et d’histoire : Le Nouveau Paris, Nillson
- 1913: Daumier, Éditions Floury
- 1926: Victor Hugo, le peintre, l’artiste, Crès
- 1926–1927–1928 Delacroix, Floury, 3 volumes
- 1928: La Vie glorieuse de Victor Hugo, Plon
- 1930: Logis romantiques, Horizon de France
- 1930: Versailles, Alpina
- 1932: Souvenirs parlés de Briand, Hachette
- 1933: Mes Pyrénées, Arthaud
- 1933: Victor Hugo par ceux qui l’ont connu, Stock
- 1933: La Place royale et Victor Hugo, Fernand Didot
- 1933: Delacroix et sa consolatrice, Colin
- 1935: Constantinople, Alpina
- 1935: Victor Hugo et les femmes, Flammarion
- 1935: L’Art italien, Floury, Catalogue de l’exposition du Petit Palais
- 1936: Gros, ses amis, ses élèves, Catalogue de l’exposition du Petit Palais
- 1937: La peinture française au XX, Floury, 1 volume
- 1937: Greco, Floury
- 1937: Henri Matisse, Floury
- 1938: Hôtel-Dieu, Laboratoire Cida
- 1941: La Peinture française au XIX, Floury, 3 volumes
- 1945: Maquis de Gascogne, collection « Documents d'aujourd'hui » issue IV, Geneva, Éditions du Milieu du Monde
- 1951: Victor Hugo, cet inconnu, Plon
- 1952: Un amant de génie, Victor Hugo, Plon
- 1956: Matisse, ce vivant, Fayard
- 1957: La Neige qui brûle : Marie Noël, Fayard
- 1962: Mes Pyrénées de Gavarnie au Canigou, Arthaud
- 1963: Eugène Delacroix, Édition du centenaire, Cercle d’Art
- 1963: Delacroix et les femmes, Fayard
- 1965: Daumier et son monde, Éditions Berger-Levrault
- 1972: Hugo, roi de son siècle, Fayard

Magazines

Raymond Escholier collaborated with the following newspapers and magazines: Mercure de France; Gazette des Beaux-Arts; Correspondant; Revue des deux Mondes; Revue des Vivants; Le Figaro littéraire; L'Illustration; Nouvelles Littéraires; Vient de paraître; Tableaux de Paris; La Dépêche de Toulouse; Arts; Arts et Médecine; Comœdia; Journal; Petit Journal; Temps; Le Monde Illustré; Revue du Languedoc; Revue du Tarn; Gai Saber; Revue de Paris; Revue Hommes et Mondes.

Direction of series

- 1924–1925: "Demain"
- 1936–1946: "Les Arts de la Bibliothèque Artistique", éditions Floury

Works in common with Marie-Louise Escholier

- 1919: Dansons la Trompeuse, Grasset, (Prix Northcliffe).
- 1921: Cantegril, Grasset, (Prix Femina – Vie Heureuse).
- 1923: La Nuit, Grasset
- 1925: Quand on conspire, Grasset
- 1925: Le Chaudron de cuivre, Éditions de la Cité
- 1929: Gascogne, Horizon de France
- 1931: L’Herbe d’amour, Albin Michel, (Grand prix de Littérature de l’Académie française).
- 1936: Au pays de Cantegril, Ferenczi
- 1952: Le Secret de Montségur, in collaboration with Maurice Gardelle, Éditions de la Colombe, 1952.

Works by Marie-Louise Escholier

- 1986: Les Saisons du vent, journal août 1914-mai 1915, Carcassonne, Garae / Hésiode.

== Sources ==
- Bernadette Contenson (under the direction of), Paris 1937, L’Art indépendant, Musée d'Art Moderne de la Ville de Paris, Catalog of the exhibition presented as part of the fiftieth anniversary of the International Exhibition of Arts and Techniques in Modern Life, from 1 June to 30 August 1937, Paris, 1987, 259 pages.
- André Ducasse, Jacques Meyer, Gabriel Perreux, Vie et mort des Français, 1914-1918, Paris, Hachette, 1959, 547 pages; p. 495–502 : La Guerre et les Écrivains.
- Exposition de l’Art italien de Cimabue à Tiepolo, mai-juin-juillet 1935, Catalogue, Petit Palais, 1935, XLV + 526 pages and volume of 172 plates, prefaced by RaymondEscholier.
- Jean Hugo, Le Regard de la Mémoire, Actes Sud, 1983.
- Raymond Lécuyer, "Les maîtres de l’Art indépendant" au Petit Palais, in Le Figaro, Sateday 19 June 1937.
- Bernadette Truno-Vidal, Raymond et Marie-Louise Escholier, de l’Ariège à Paris, un destin étonnant, Essai, Éditions Trabucaire, Canet-en-Roussillon, 2004, 221 pages.
- Raymond Escholier (2013). Avec les tirailleurs sénégélais 1917-1919. Vol. 1, Lettres inédites du front d'Orient. L'Harmattan. p. 5. ISBN 9782336322100. Minet et Truno1.
- Raymond Escholier (2013). Avec les tirailleurs sénégélais 1917-1919. Vol. 2, Lettres inédites du front d'Orient. L'Harmattan. pp. 263–267. ISBN 9782336322117. Minet et Truno2.
