= Pueblos jóvenes =

Shanty town or slum in Peru

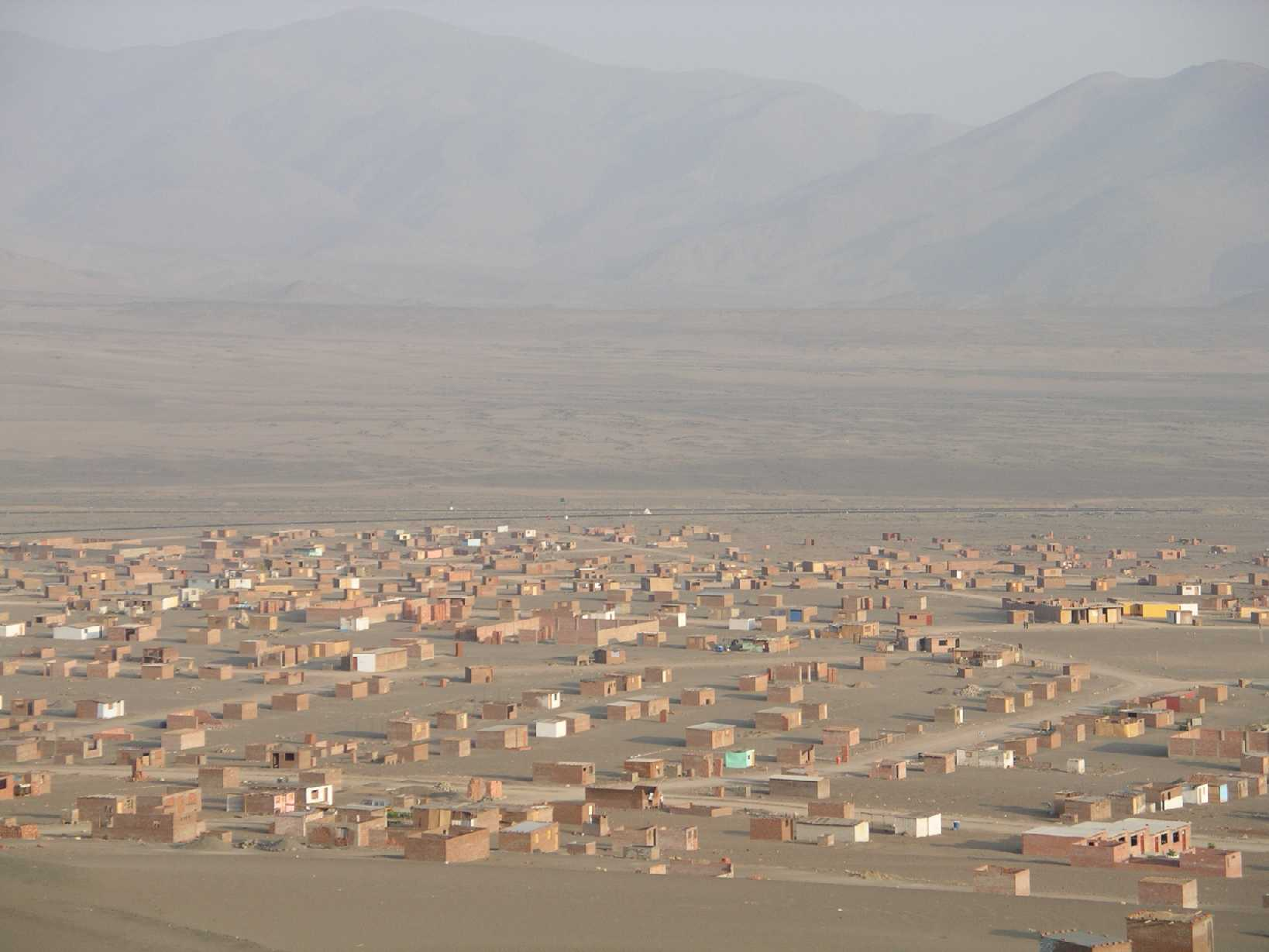
A new pueblo joven in the desert at the northern end of Peru's capital Lima, near Ancón.

Pueblos jóvenes (Spanish pronunciation: [ˈpweβlos ˈxoβenes], lit. 'young towns') is the term used for the shanty towns that surround Lima and other cities of Peru, whose origins lie in the illegal occupation of unused land that surrounds these populated places. Many of these towns have developed into districts of Lima such as Comas, Los Olivos and Villa El Salvador.

== Population ==
Pueblos jóvenes were estimated to have over one million inhabitants in 1974. They were built on hillsides or beside rivers. By 2008, it was estimated that tens of millions of Peruvians were squatting land. Areas include Comas District, Los Olivos District and Villa El Salvador in Lima.

The shanty town of Medalla Milagrosa is composed of migrants from all over Peru. Others are populated by Black, Amerindian, and mestizo campesinos who since the 1940s have migrated in great waves from Peru's countryside in search of economic opportunity, turning Lima into the fourth-largest city in America. Like many other rapidly industrializing cities, Lima's job market has largely been unable to keep up with this influx of people, forcing many to accept any housing available. The Peruvian government has permitted these communities to continue largely because it realizes that, were they to eradicate them, the inhabitants would simply move elsewhere in the city's peripheral areas.

== Gallery ==
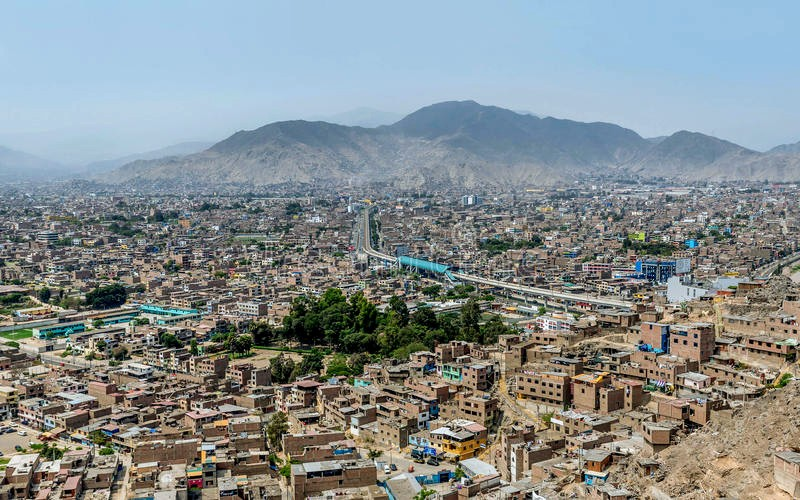
District of San Juan de Lurigancho

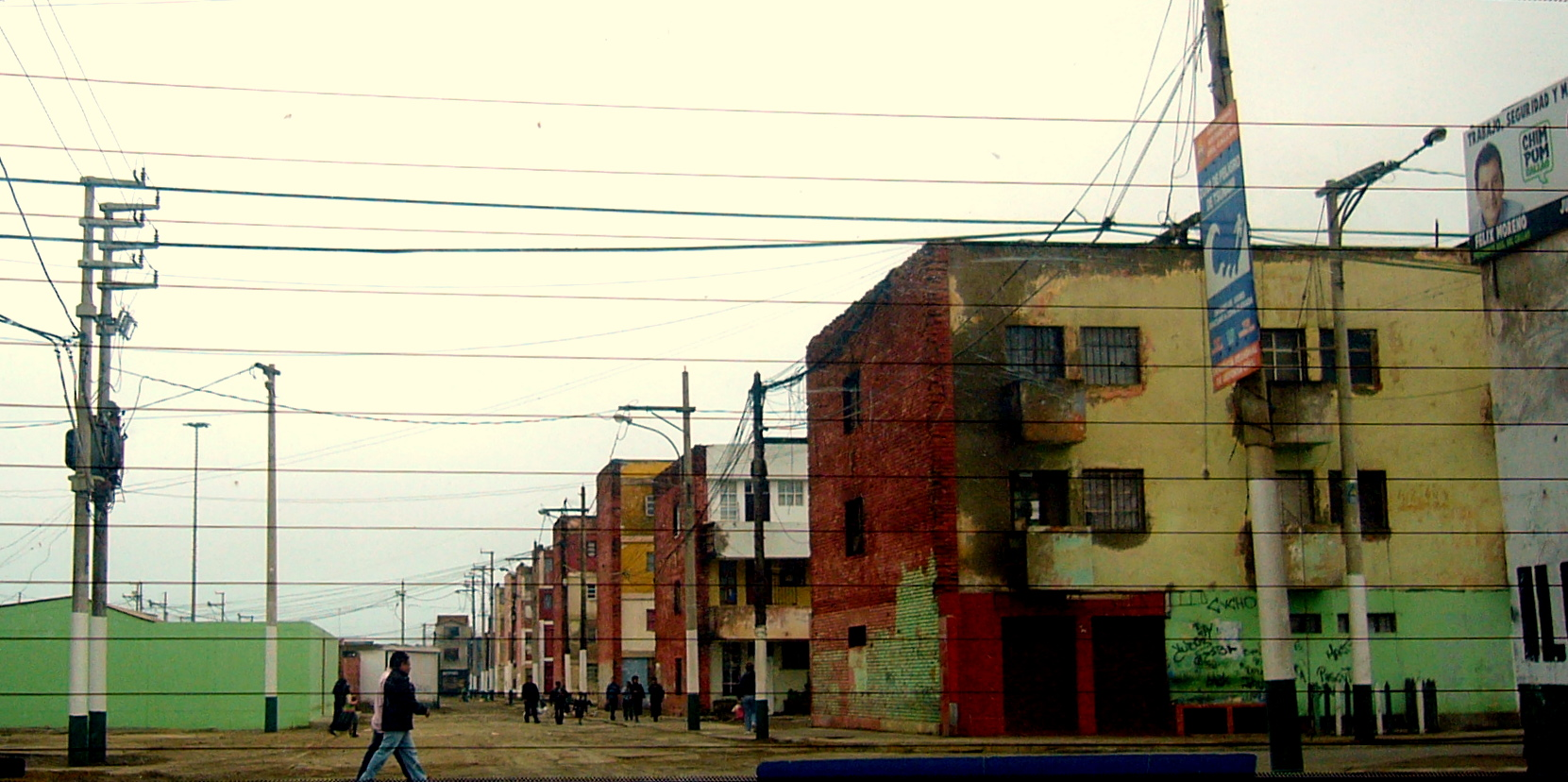
Callao

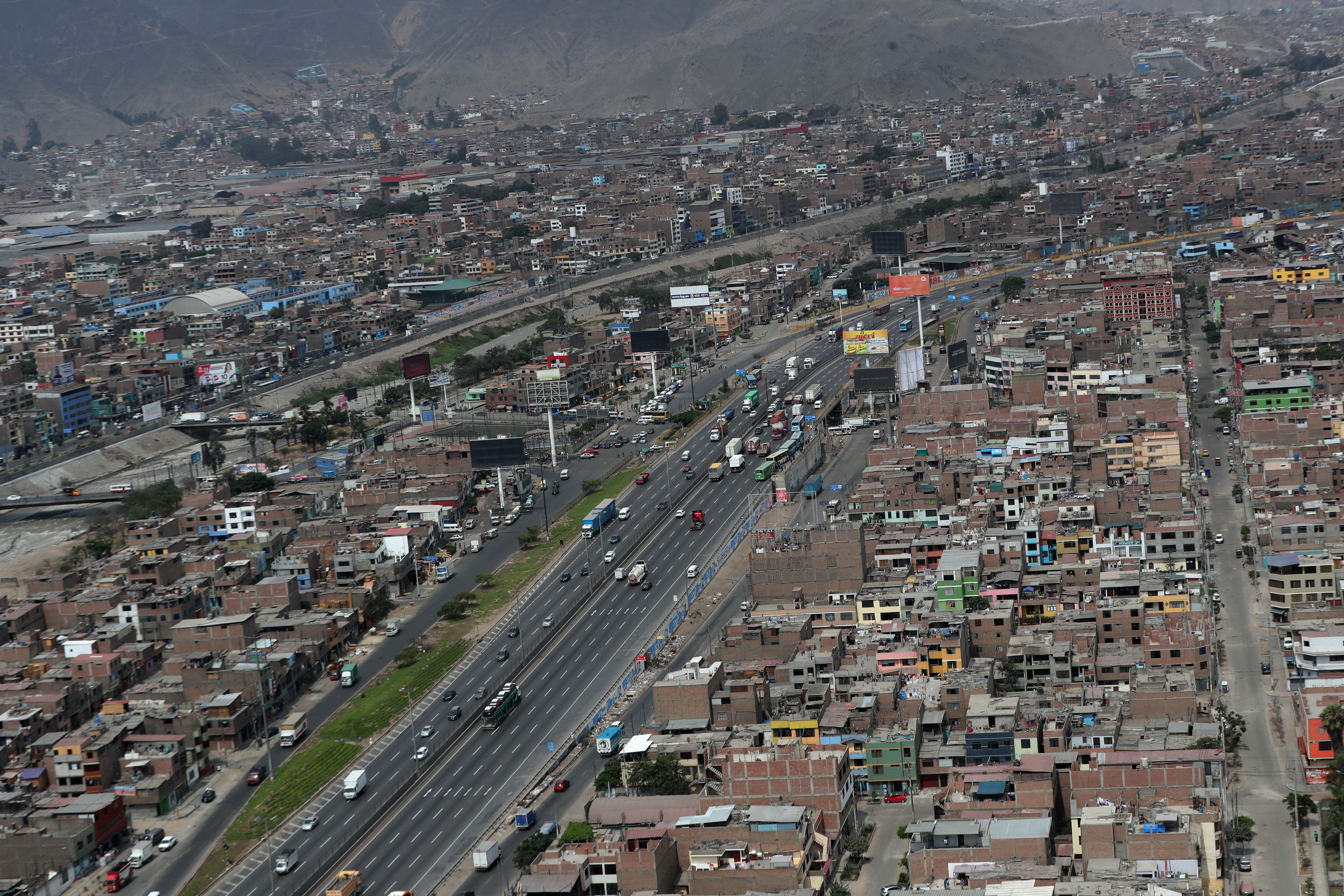
District of Agustino

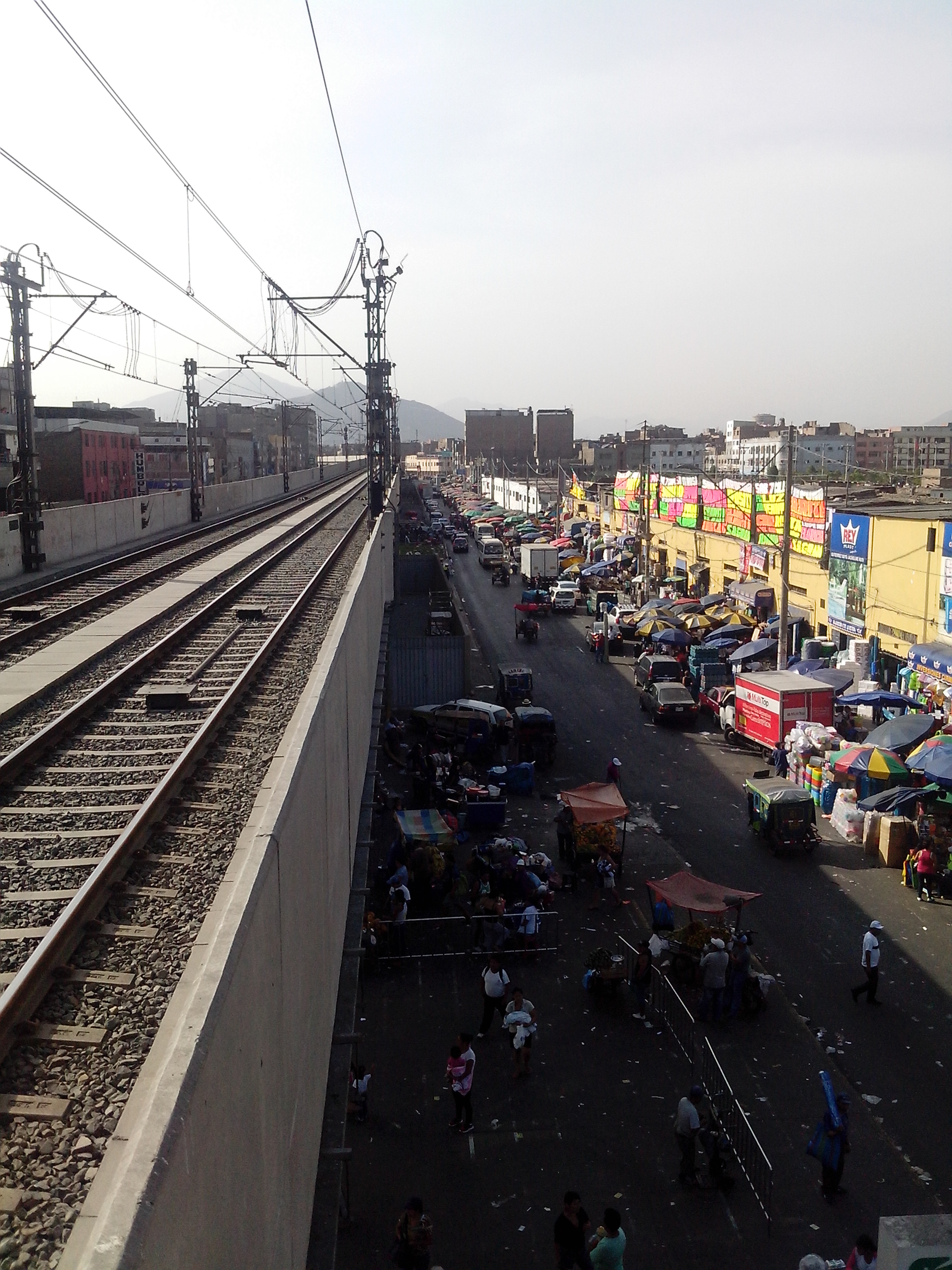
District of La Victoria

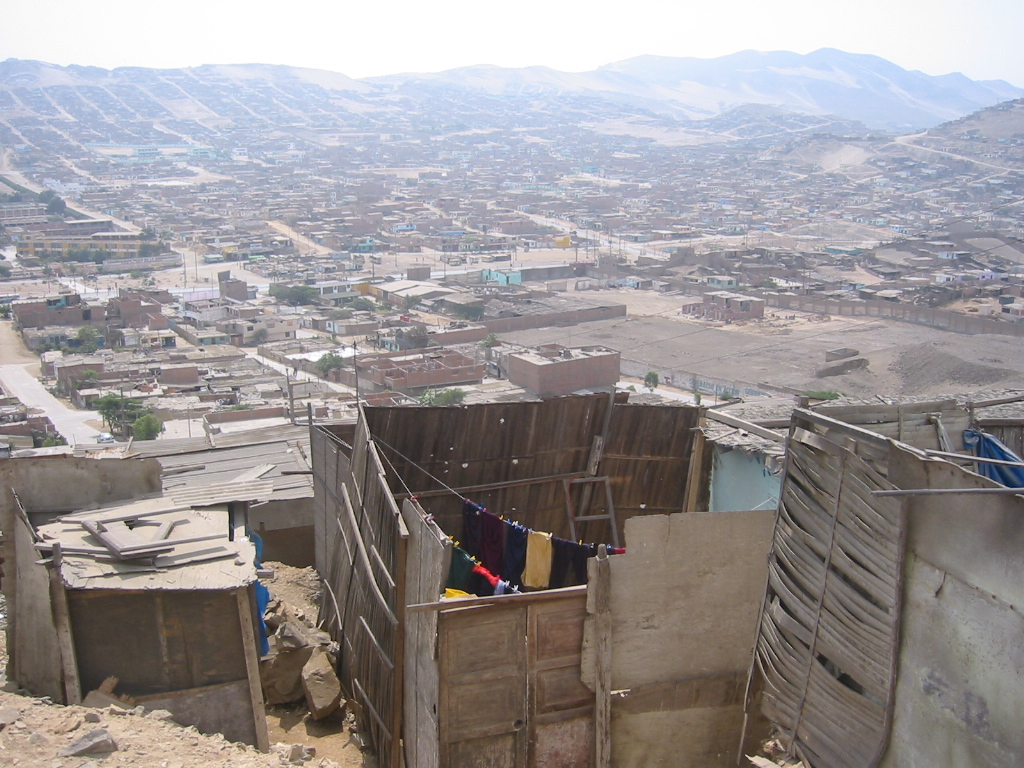
District of Ventanilla

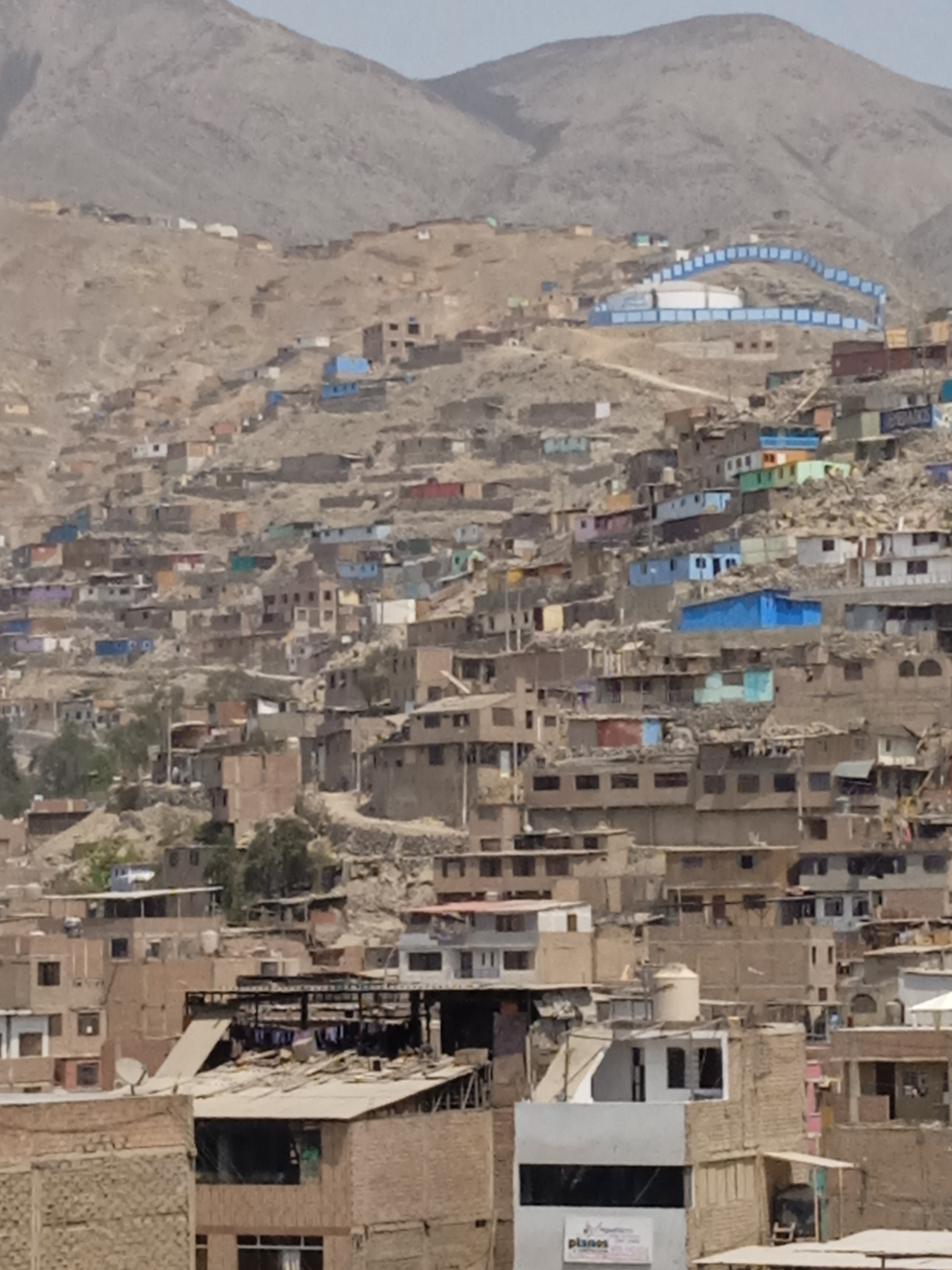
District of Comas

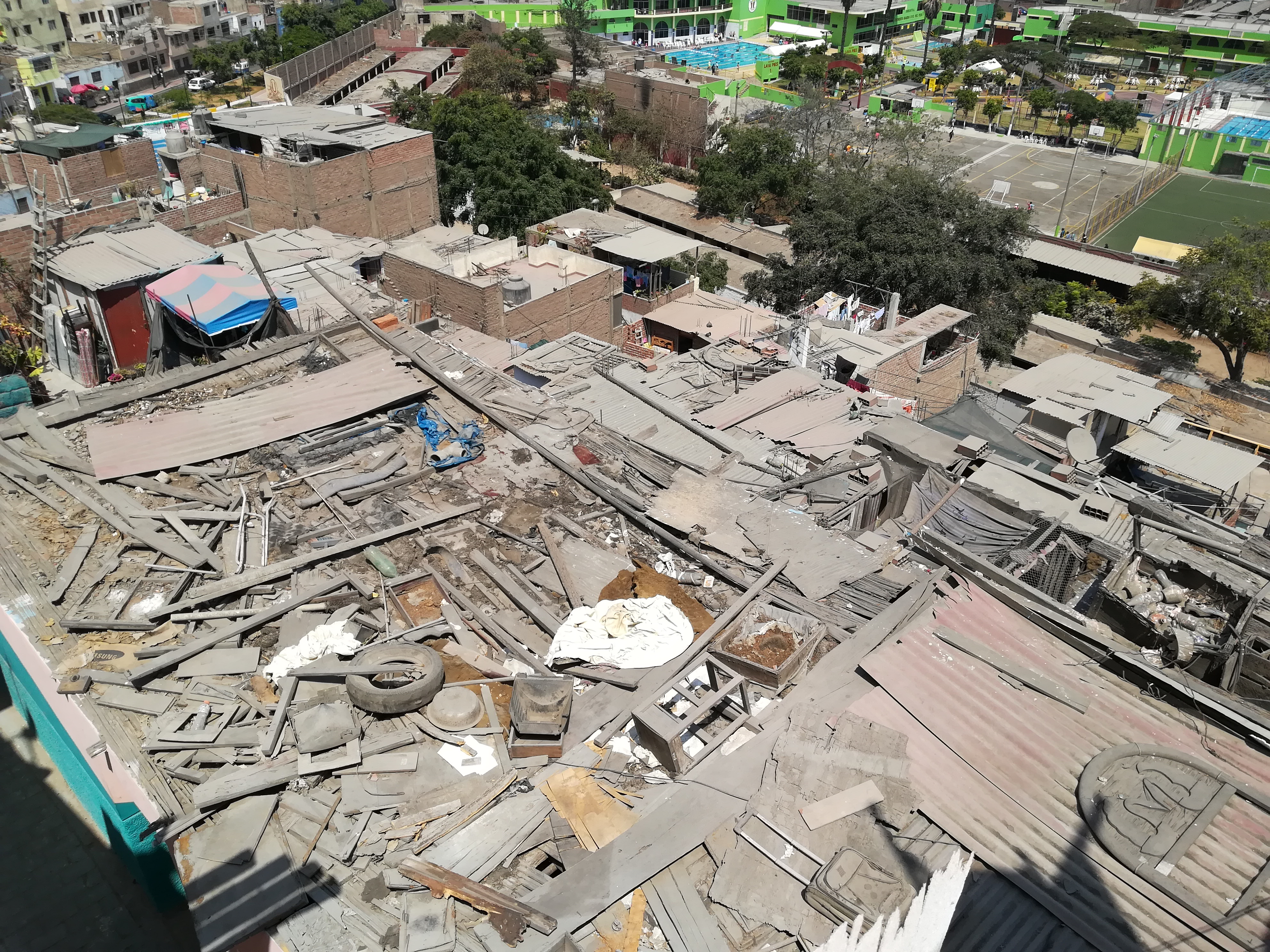
District of Rímac

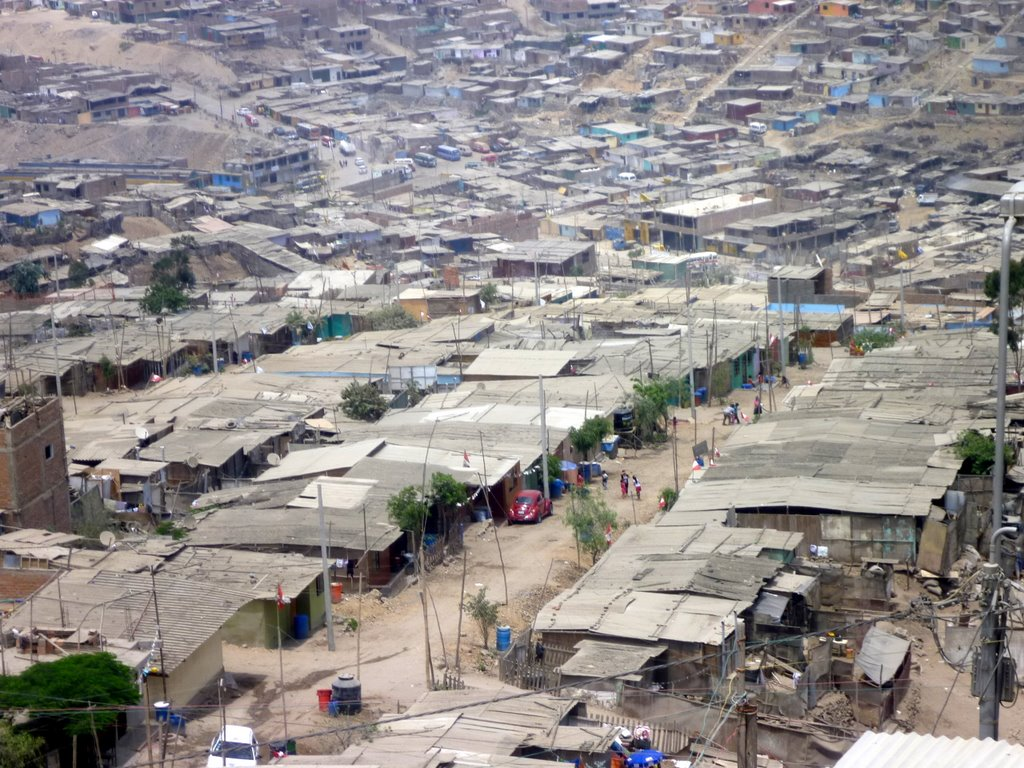
District of San Juan de Miraflores

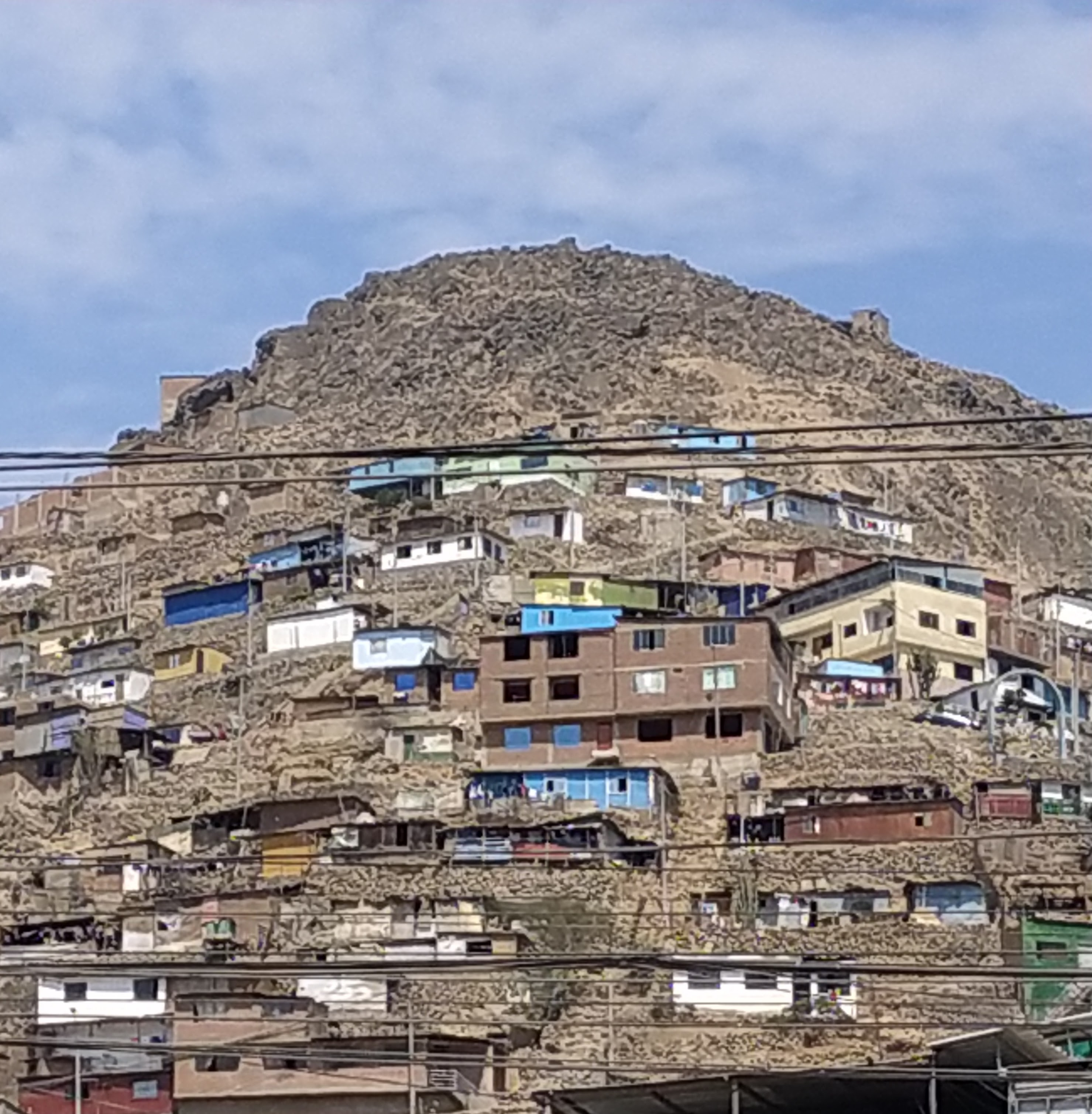
District of Villa María del Triunfo

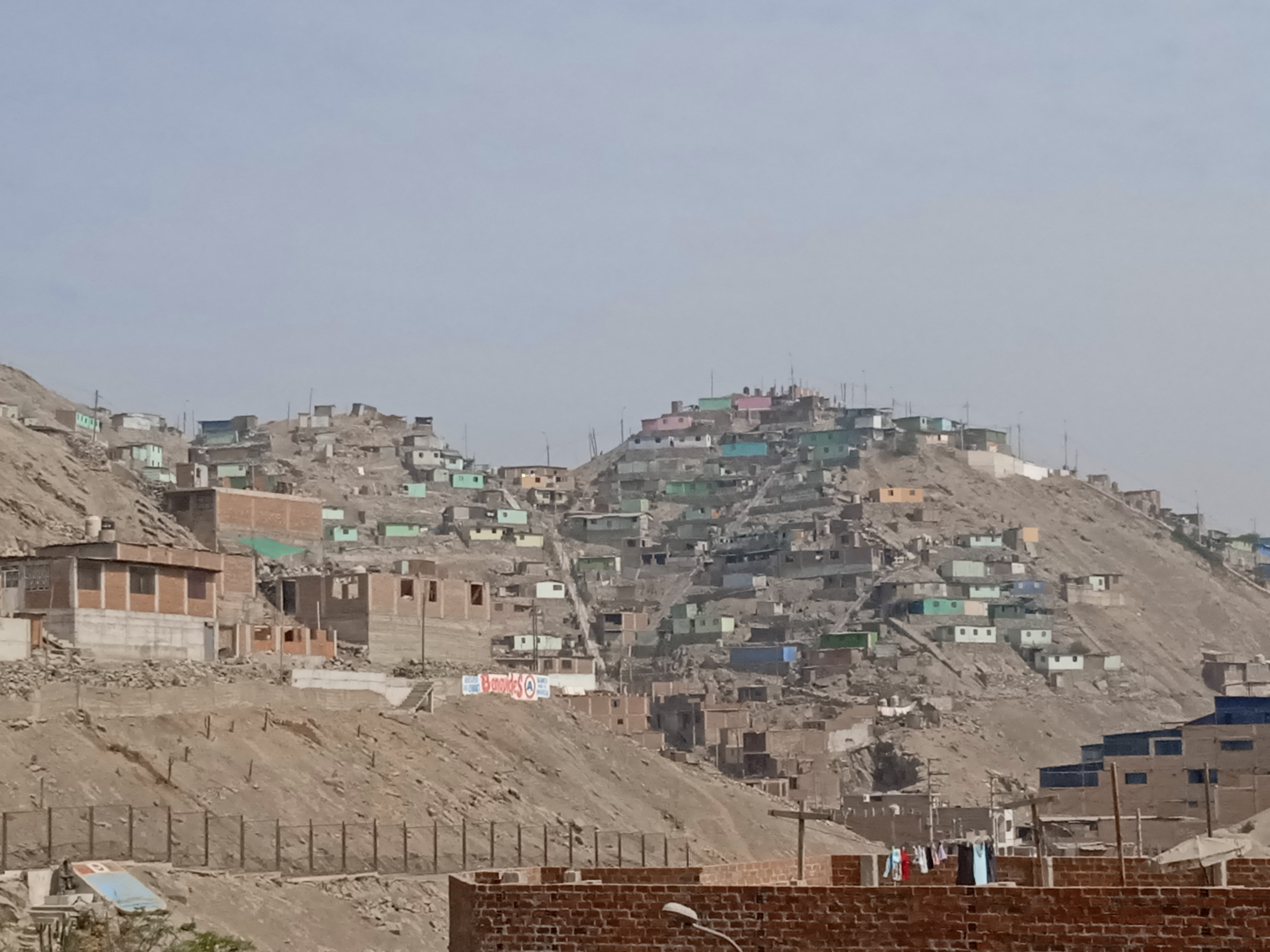
District of Ate Vitarte

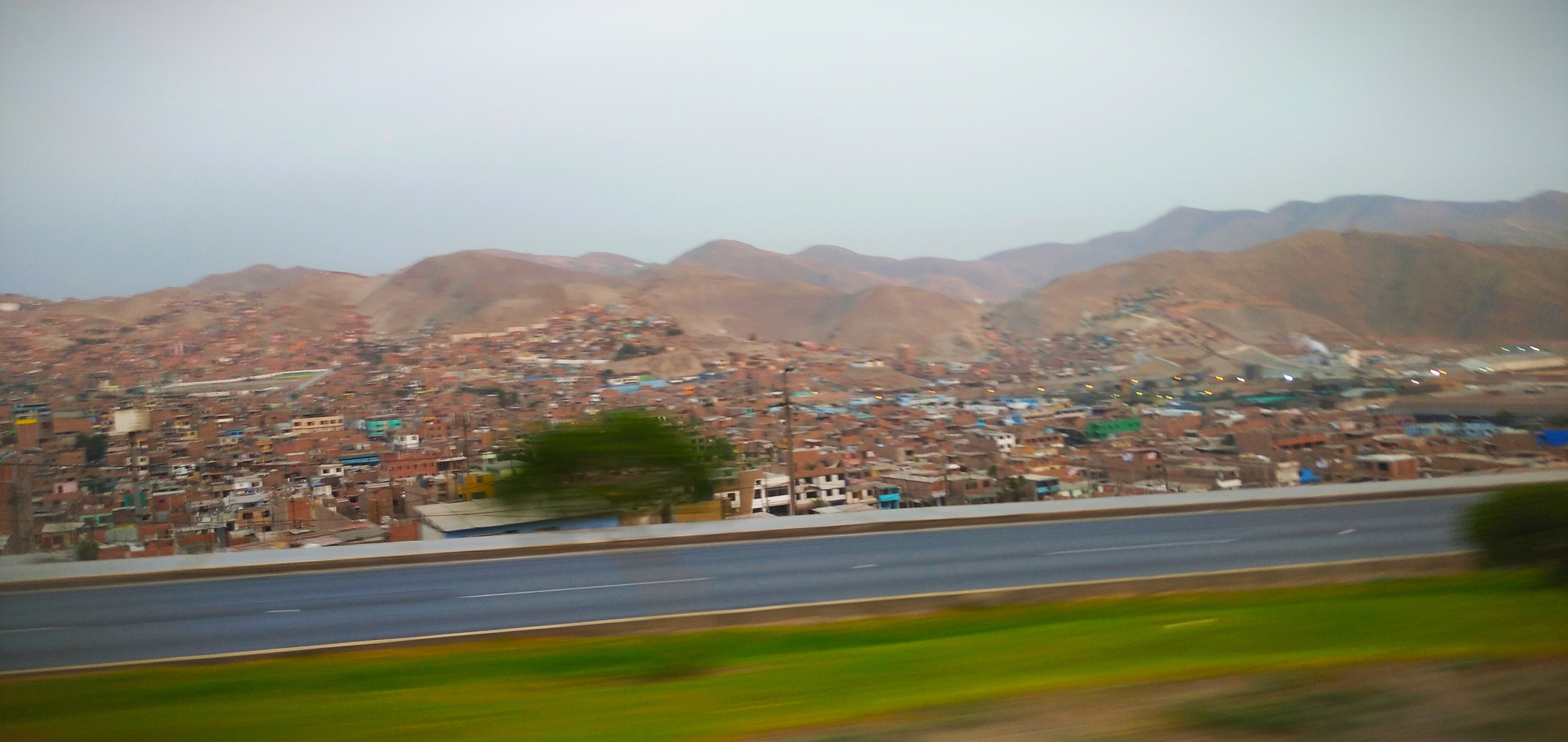
District of Mi Perú

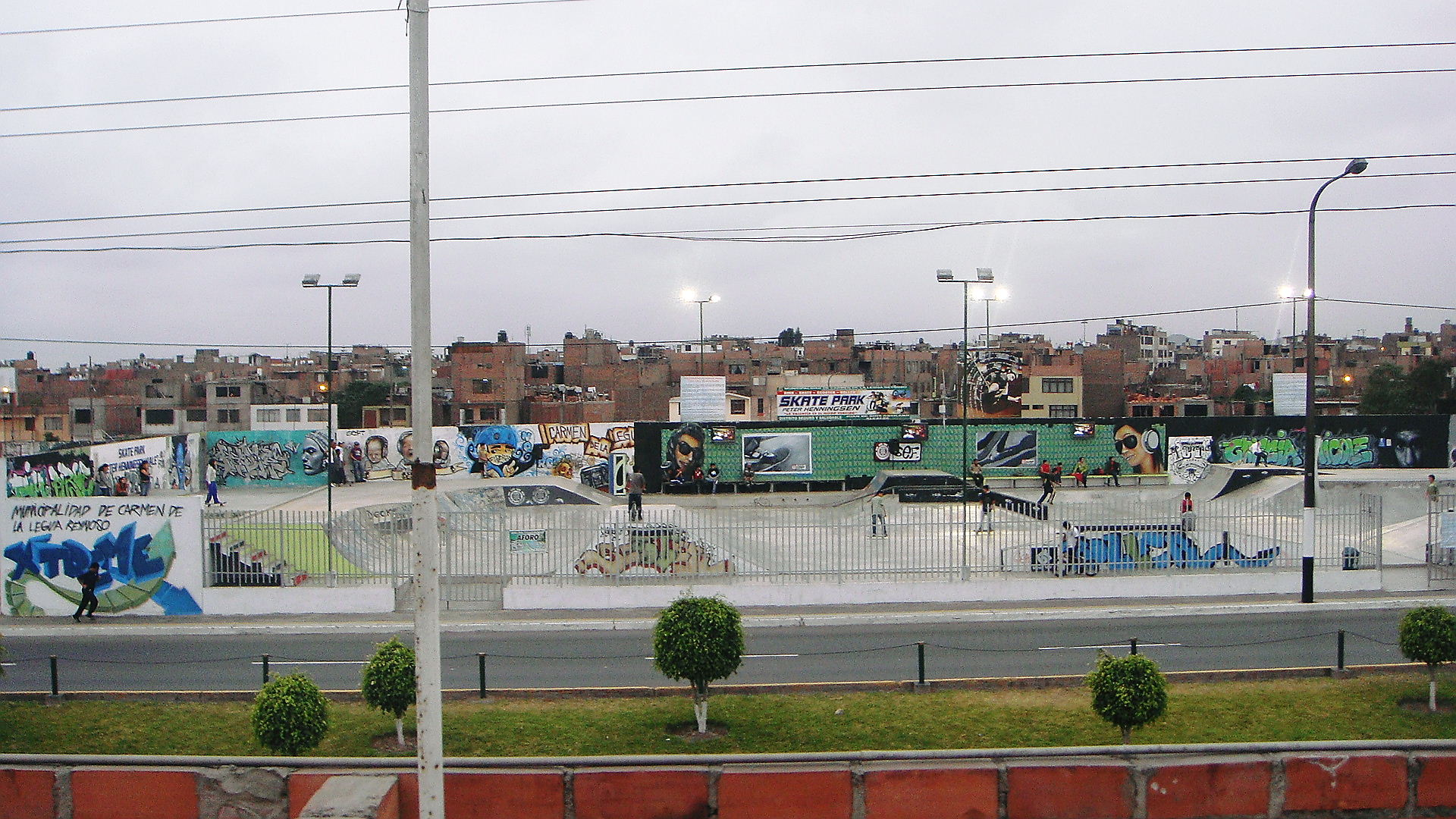
District of Carmen de La Legua-Reynoso

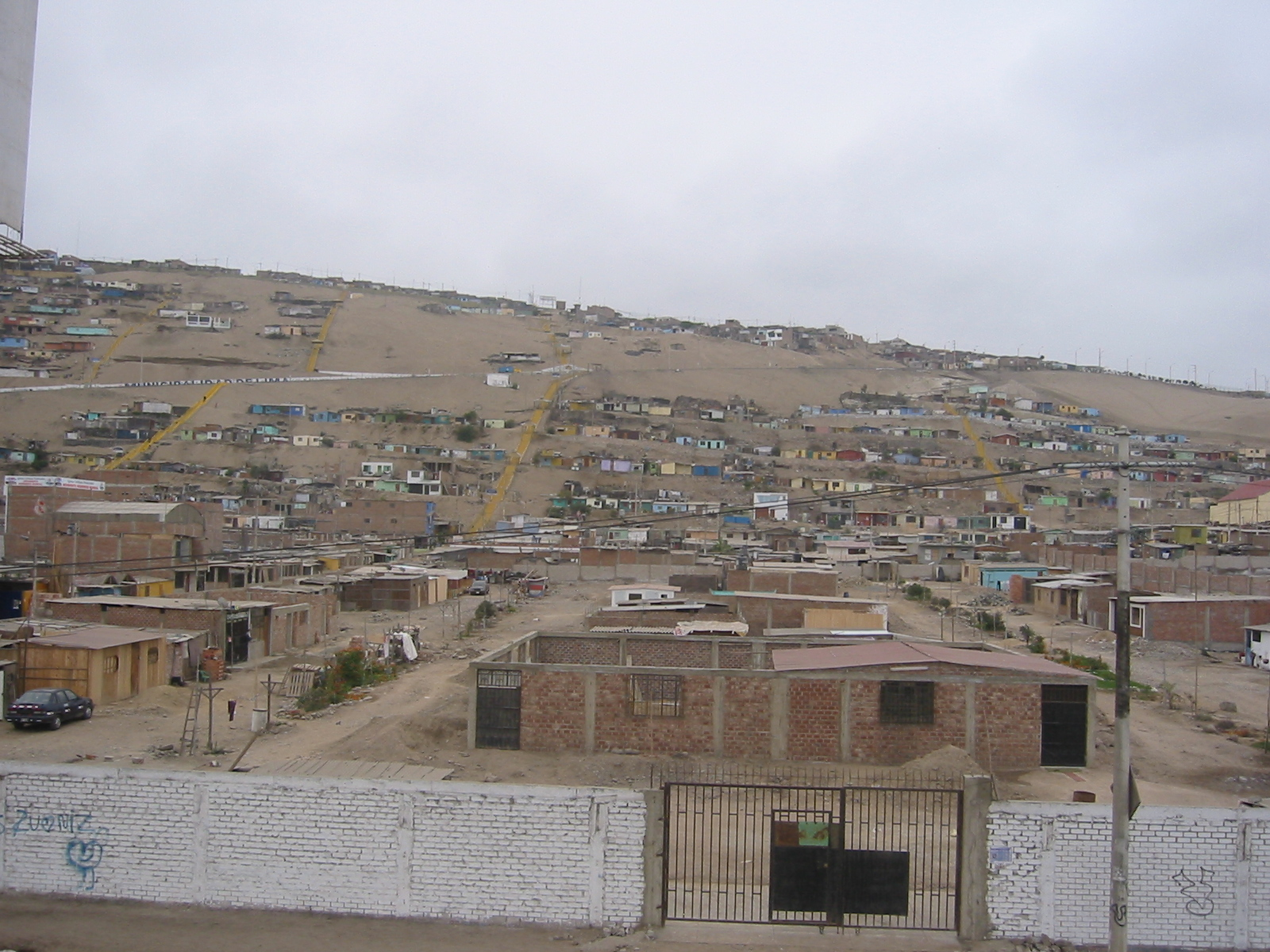
District of Villa el Salvador

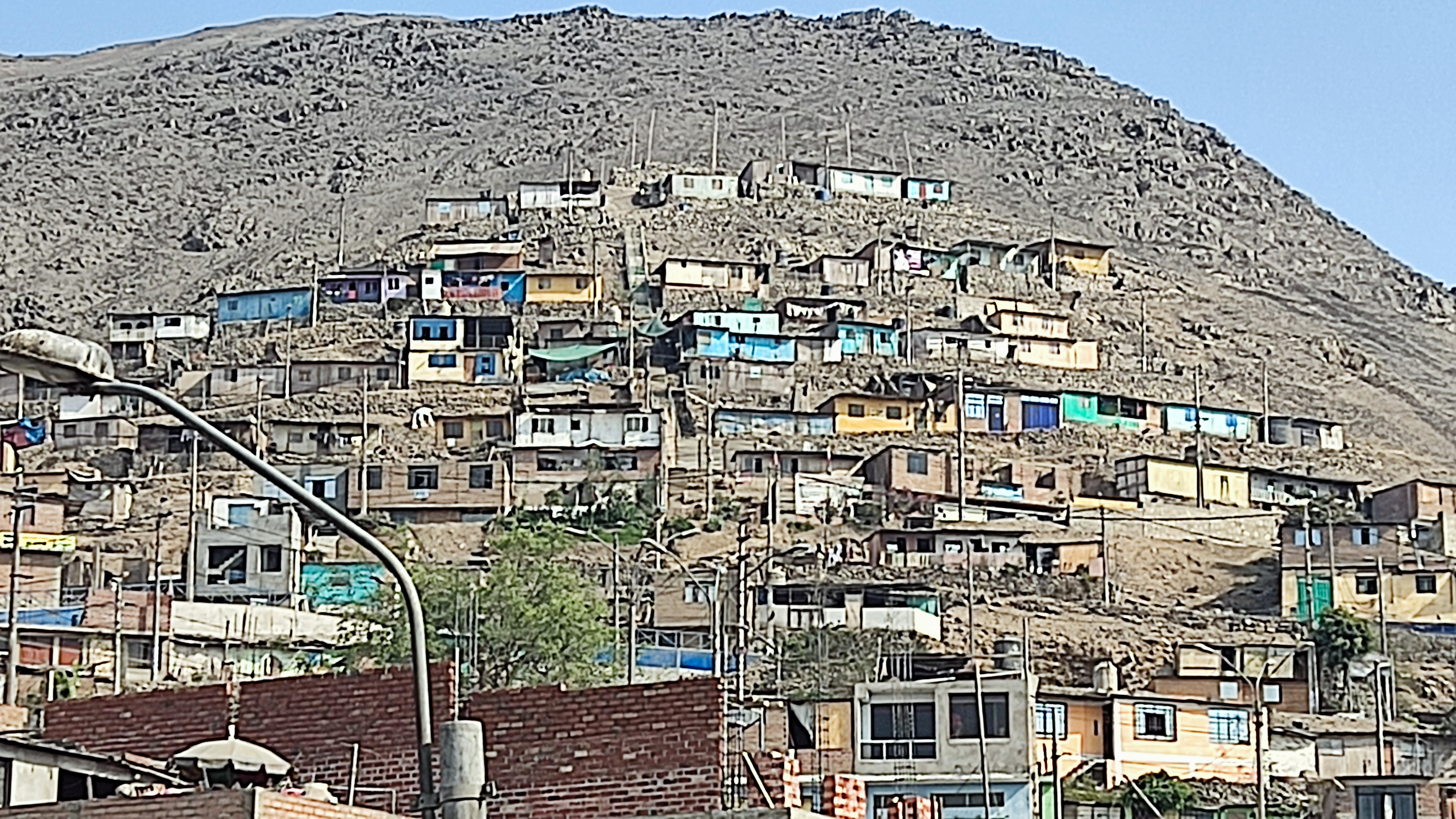
Carabayllo District

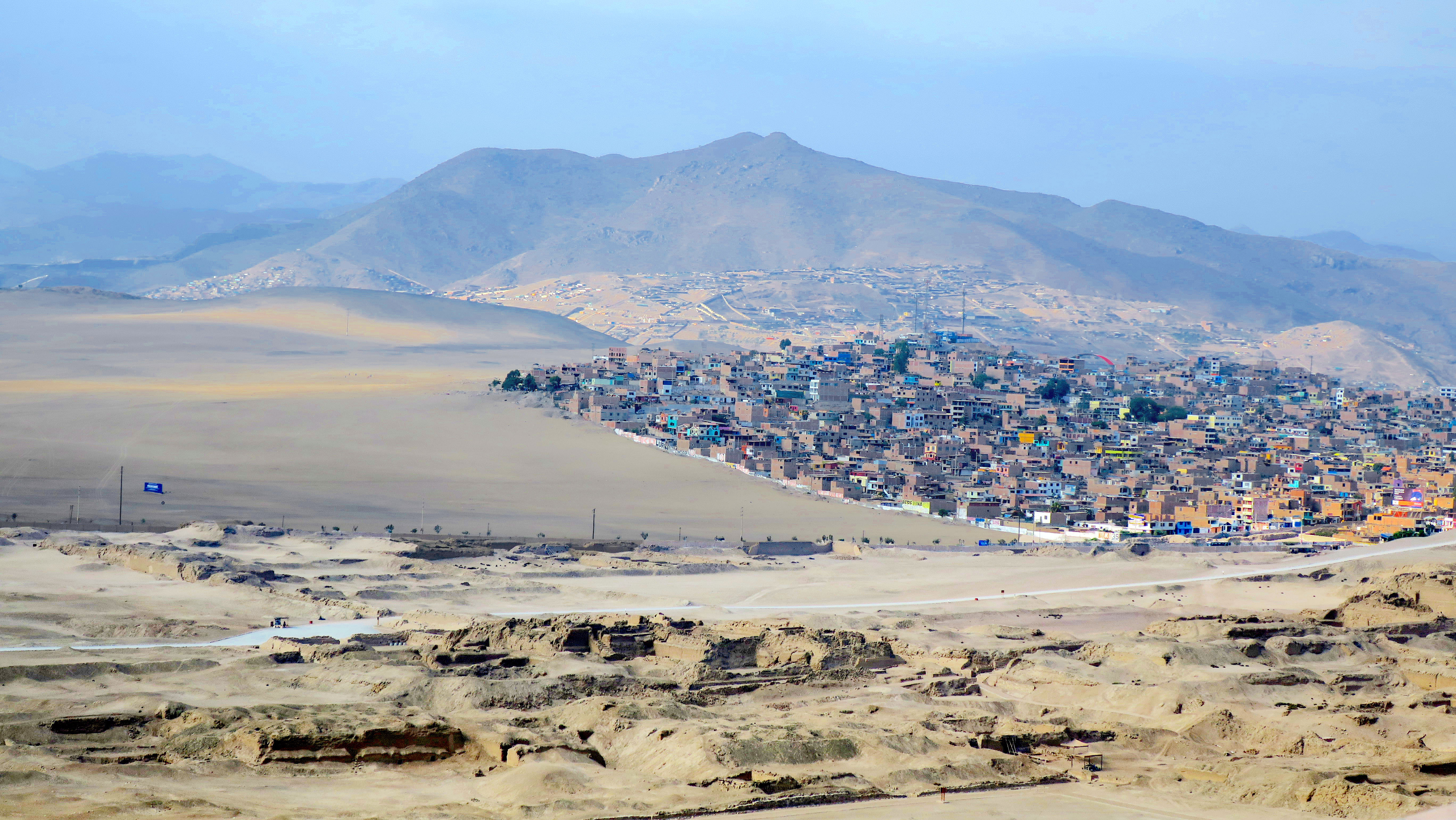
Pachacámac - Lurín River Valley, Lima, Peru
Pueblo Joven, south of Lima

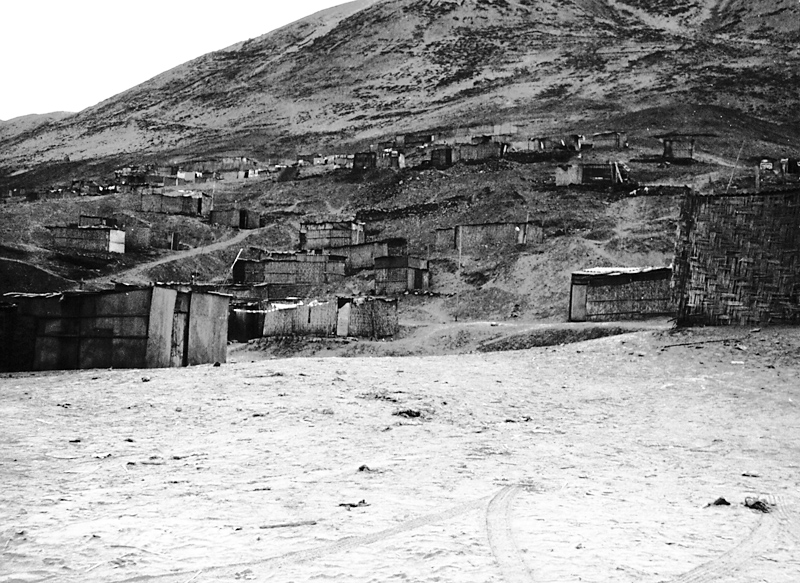

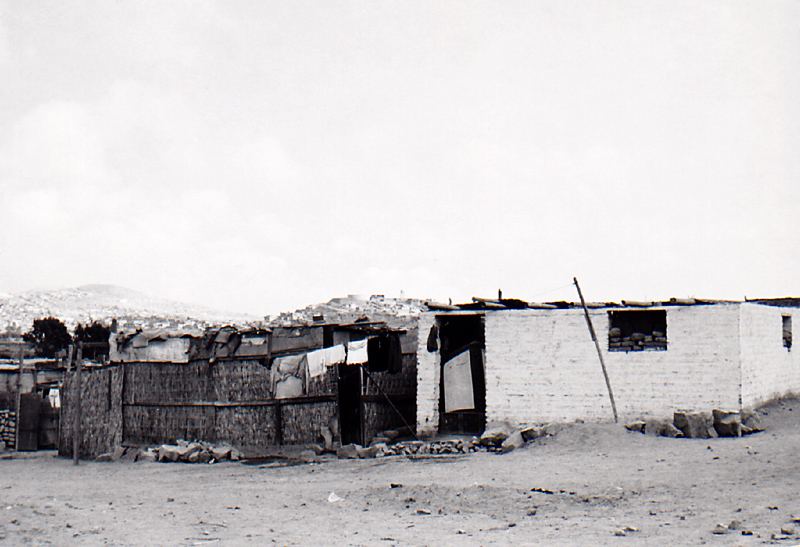

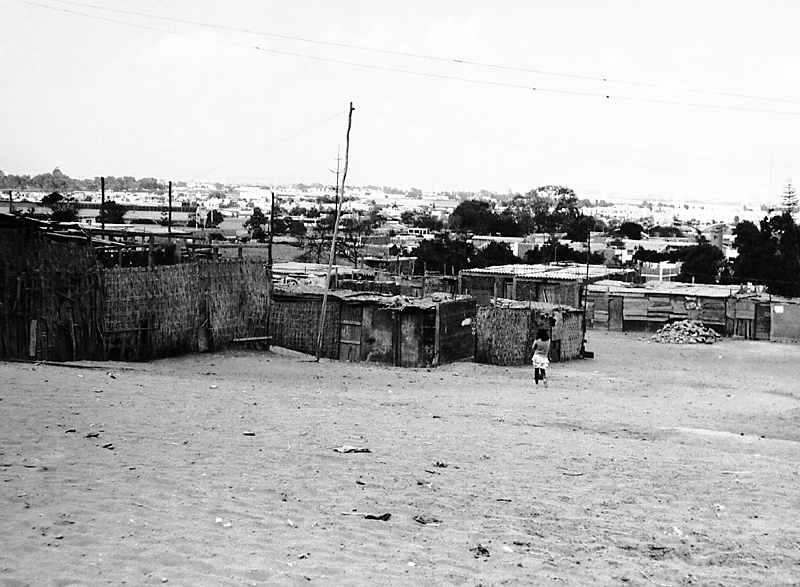

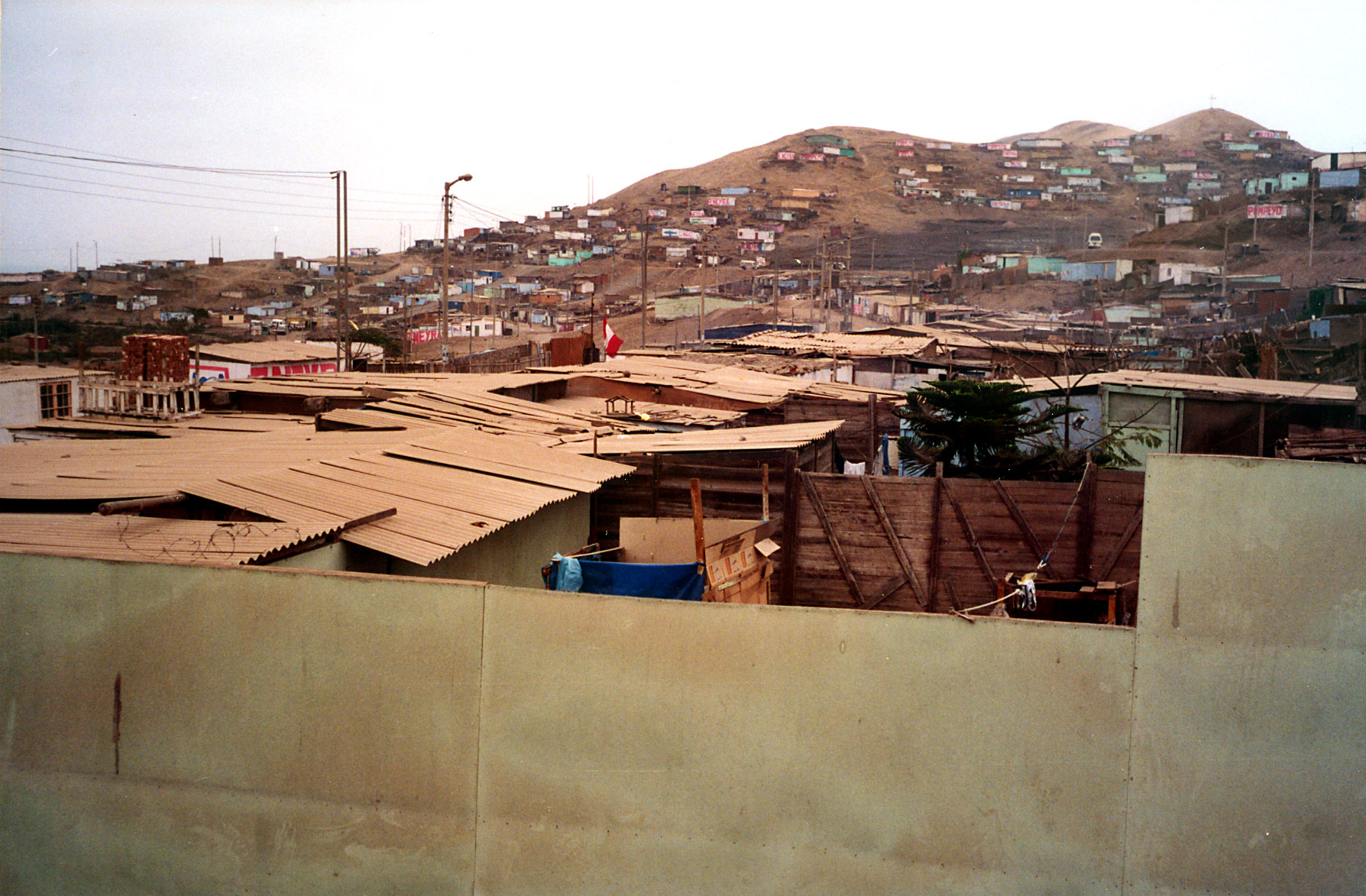

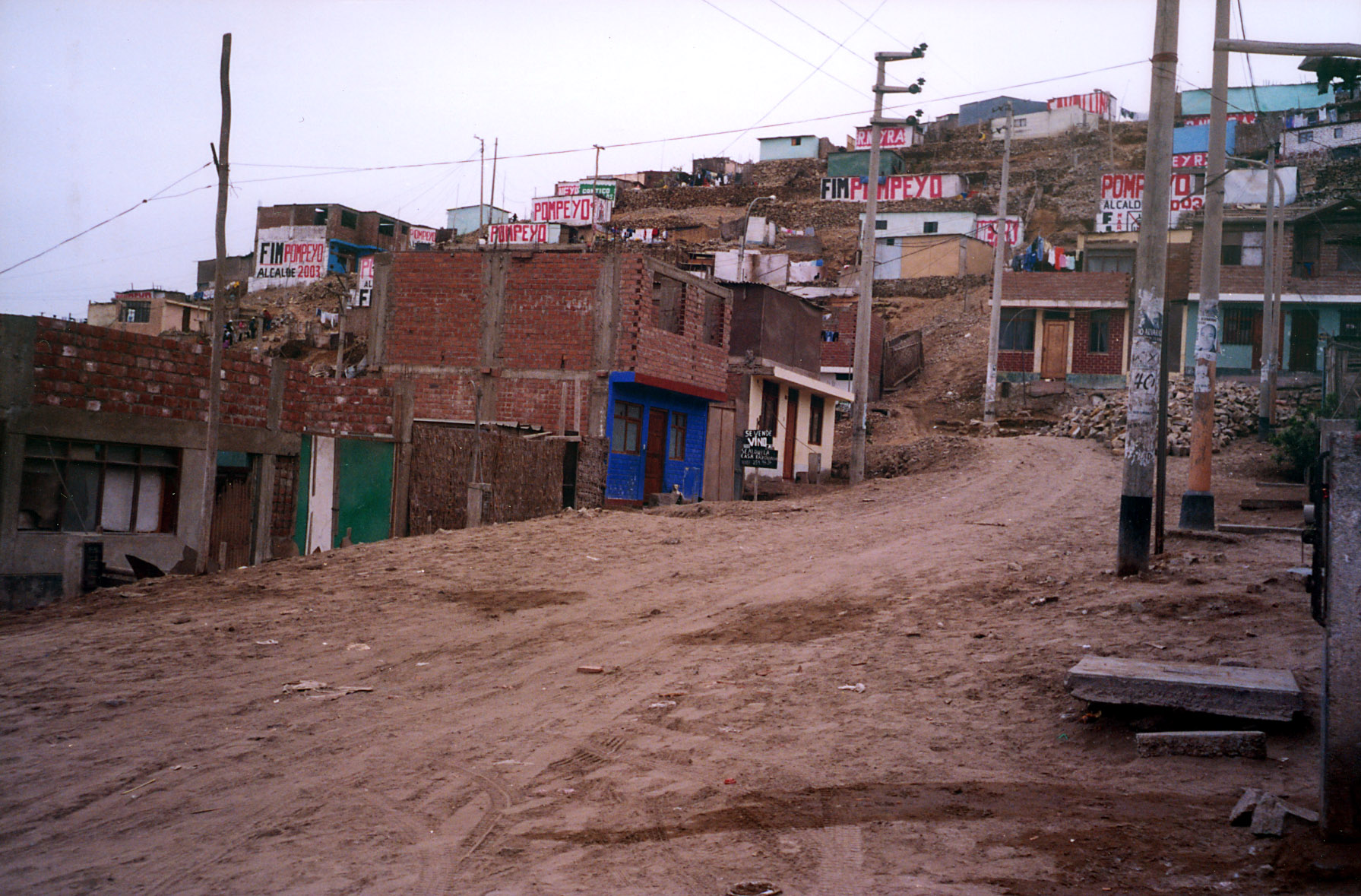

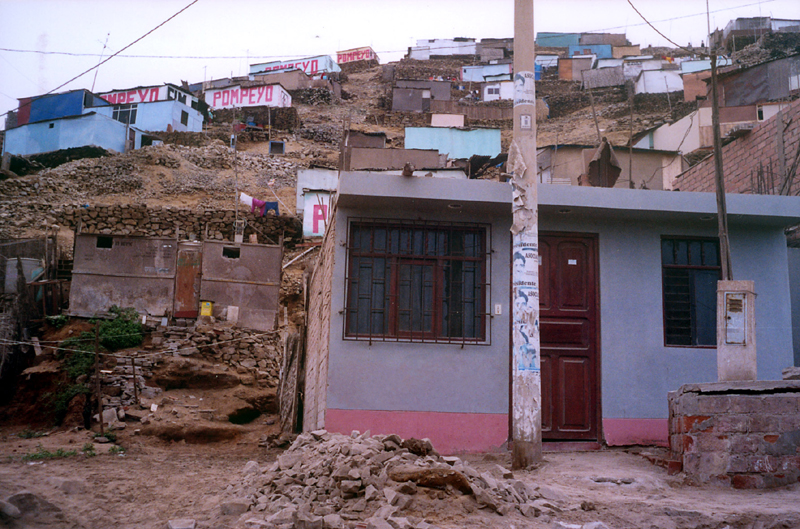

== See also ==
- Arrabal (Puerto Rico)
- Asentamiento (Guatemala)
- Barrio (Venezuela)
- Cantegril (Uruguay)
- Favela (Brazil)
- Campamento (Chile)
- Villa Miseria (Argentina)
- Ghetto (United States)
- Colonia (United States)
