= Tres Ombúes =

Tres Ombúes - Pueblo Victoria
- Barrio
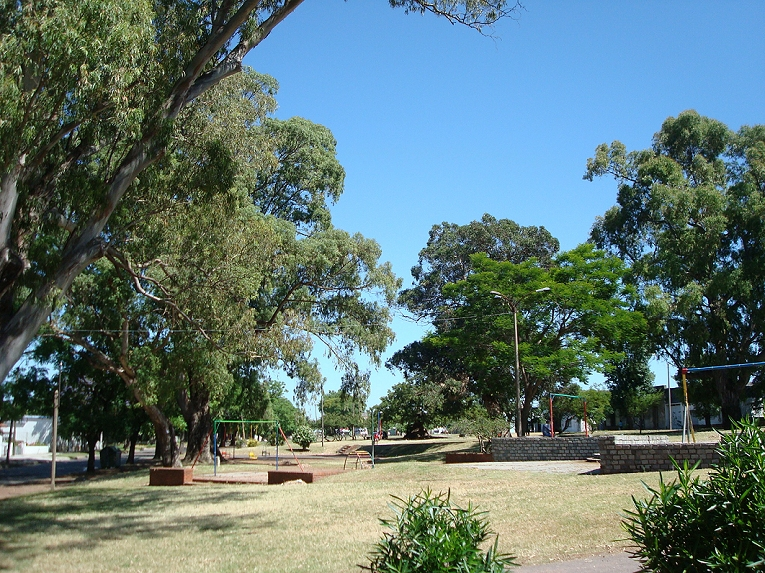
- Park in Tres Ombúes

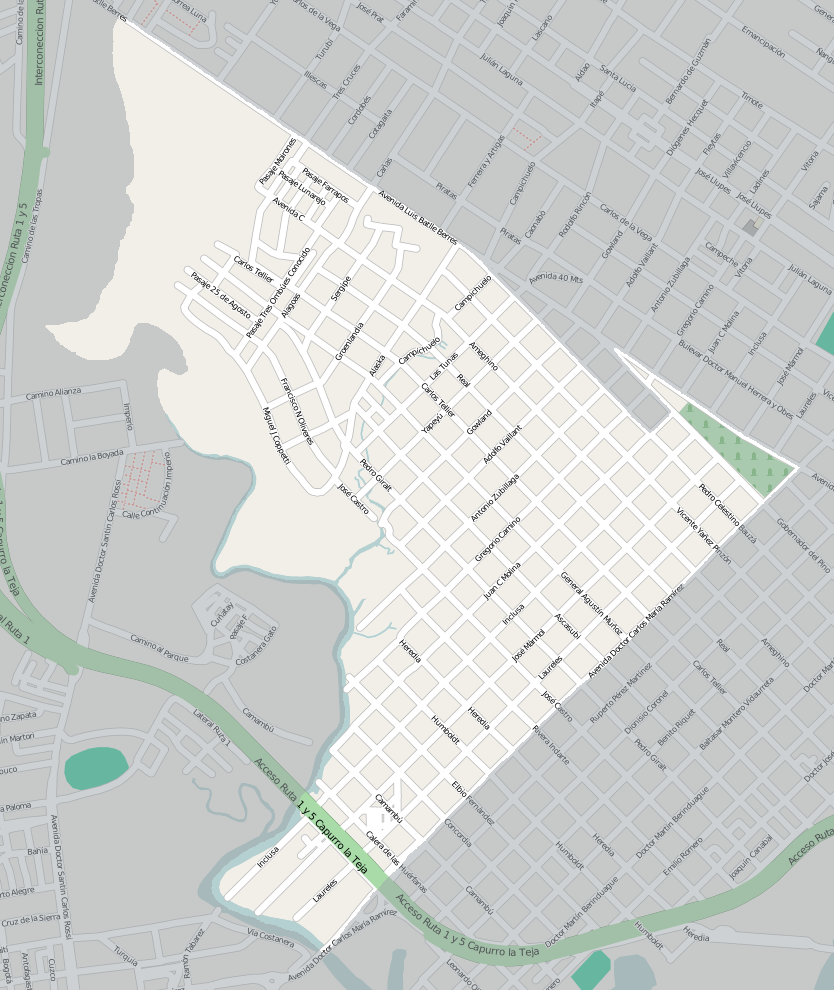
- Street map of Tres Ombúes - Pueblo Victoria

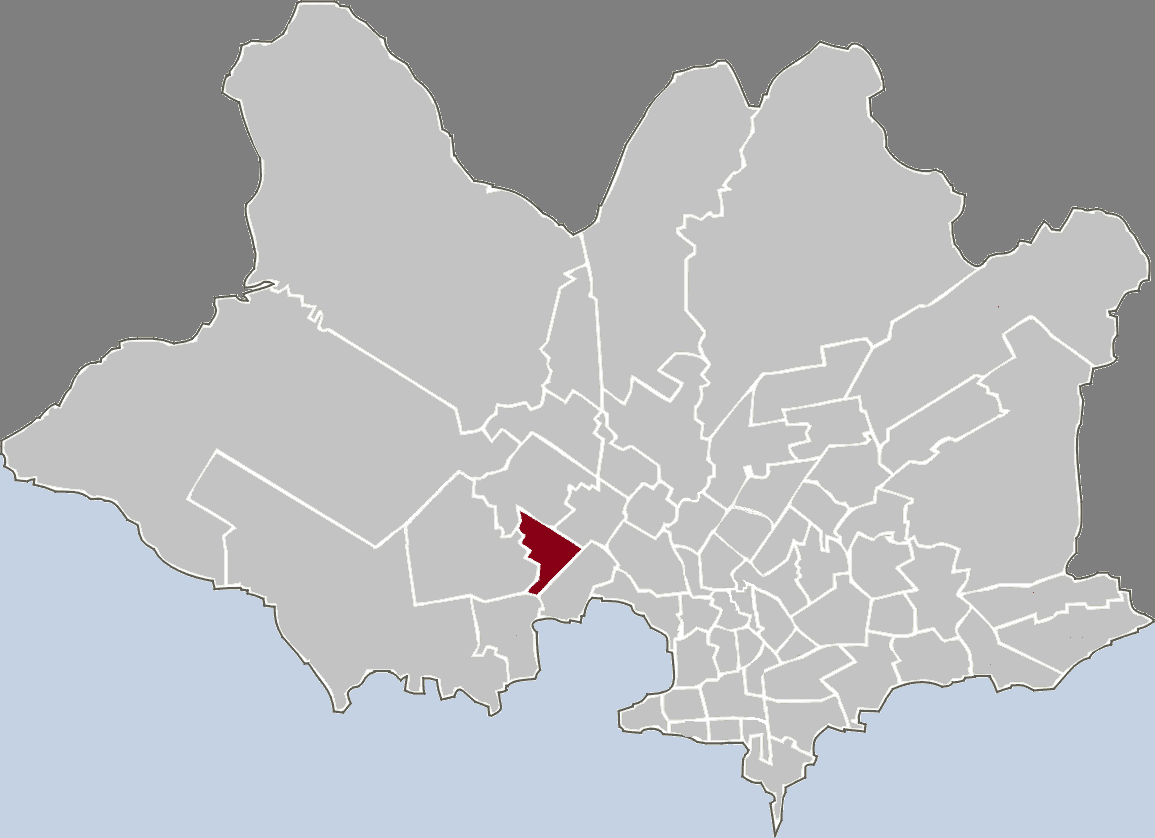
- Location of Tres Ombúes - P.Victoria in Montevideo
- Coordinates: 34°51′47″S 56°14′30″W
- Country: Uruguay
- Department: Montevideo Department
- City: Montevideo

Tres Ombúes - Pueblo Victoria is a barrio (neighbourhood or district) of Montevideo, Uruguay.

== Public transport ==
In the district Three Ombues passes only a single bus in the neighborhood that is as follows: 524

== See also ==
- Barrios of Montevideo
