= La Teja Refinery =

Oil refinery in Uruguay

Coordinates: 34.87515°S 56.22998°W

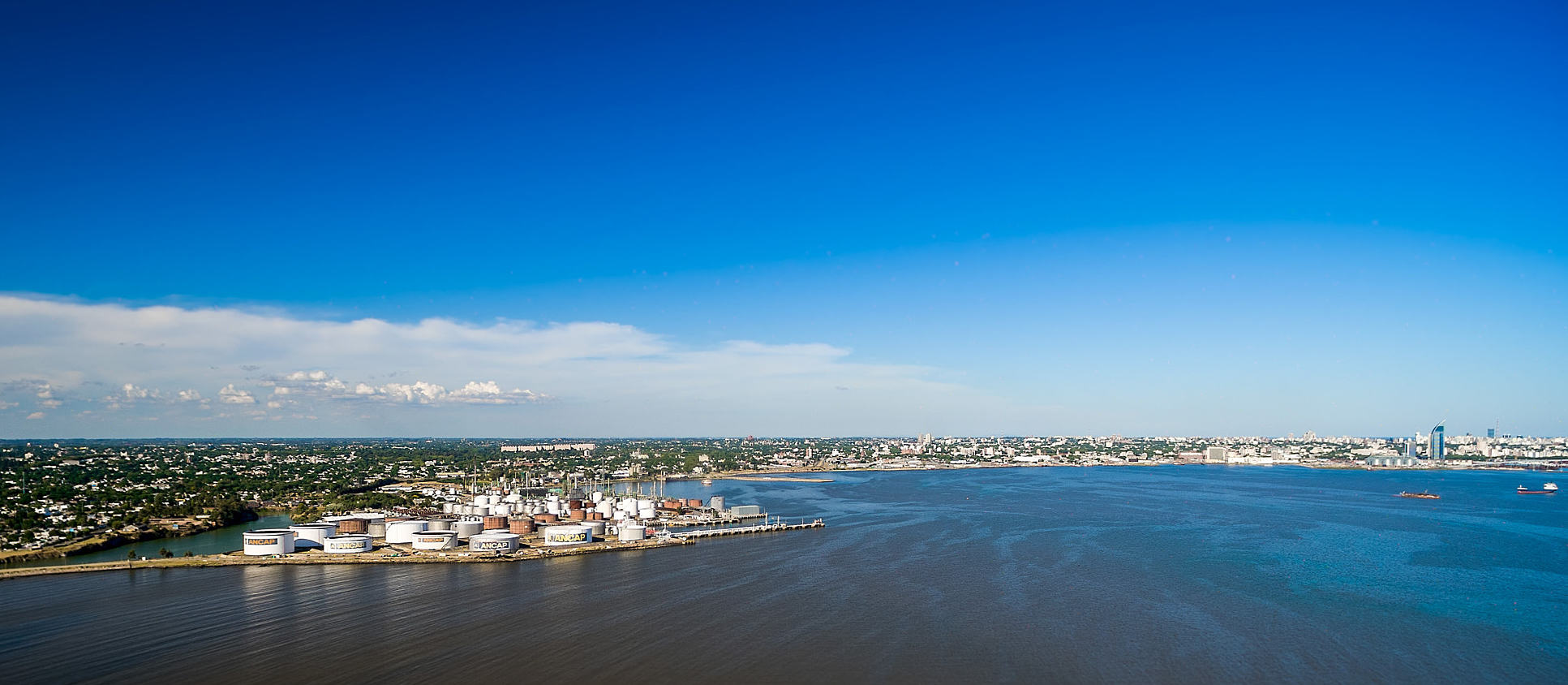
- La Teja Refinery (right) with La Teja neighborhood inland and the main city of Montevideo on the right.

Refinery details
- Owner(s): ANCAP

The La Teja Refinery is the only oil refinery in Uruguay, and is located in the La Teja neighborhood in Montevideo. Owned by the national industry ANCAP, the refinery primarily produces light-grade oil products used for domestic industries. The refinery is connected to an oil terminal in the Port of Montevideo.

The refinery was first operated in 1937, and currently has a total capacity of approximately 50,000 barrels a day. As of 2022, two-thirds of Uruguay's petroleum imports come from the United States, with a further 18% from neighboring Brazil.

== Emissions ==
A 2011 study measured found SO_{2} emissions to be ~ 4×10^{17} molec cm^{−2} slant column density directly over the oil refinery, decreasing as the plume disperses and NO_{2} peaking at ~ 1×10^{16} molec cm^{−2}.

== Planned future ==
The refinery undergoes overhauls approximately every 4 years. The capacity of the refinery is scheduled to be upgrade in 2023 to better produce lightweight petroleum products with residual oil solvent extraction and solvent deasphalting.

Because of the energy transition in the country, where Uruguay had over 94% clean energy and the government has plans for a transition for other industries like transport, Minister of Environment Adrián Peña projected closing the refinery by 2035 to meet the zero emission goal set out in Uruguay Long Term Climate Strategy.
