= Port of Montevideo =

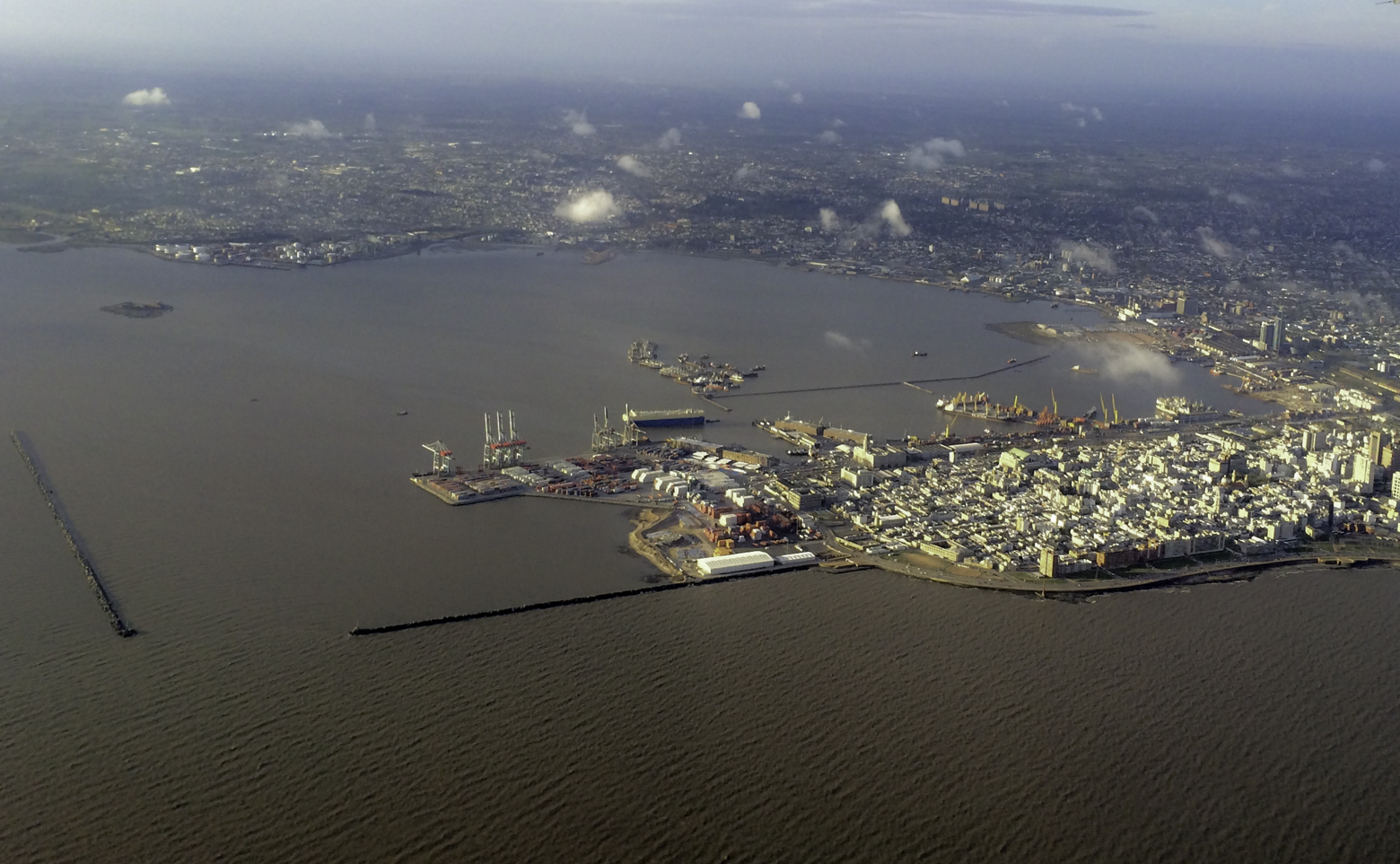
- Interactive map of Port of Montevideo
- Location in Uruguay

Location
- Country: Uruguay
- Location: Montevideo
- Coordinates: 34°54′08″S 56°12′31″W
- UN/LOCODE: UYMVD

Details
- Operated by: Administración Nacional de Puertos
- No. of berths: 19
- Draft depth: 14.0 metres (45.9 ft)

Statistics
- Website; Official website

The Port of Montevideo (Spanish: Puerto de Montevideo), in the northern part of the Old City of Montevideo, Uruguay, is one of the major ports of South America and plays a very important role in the economy of Uruguay. Notably the port includes a number of important facilities including one the countries main tourism terminals and the La Teja Refinery which processes the bulk of the countries oil.

== History ==
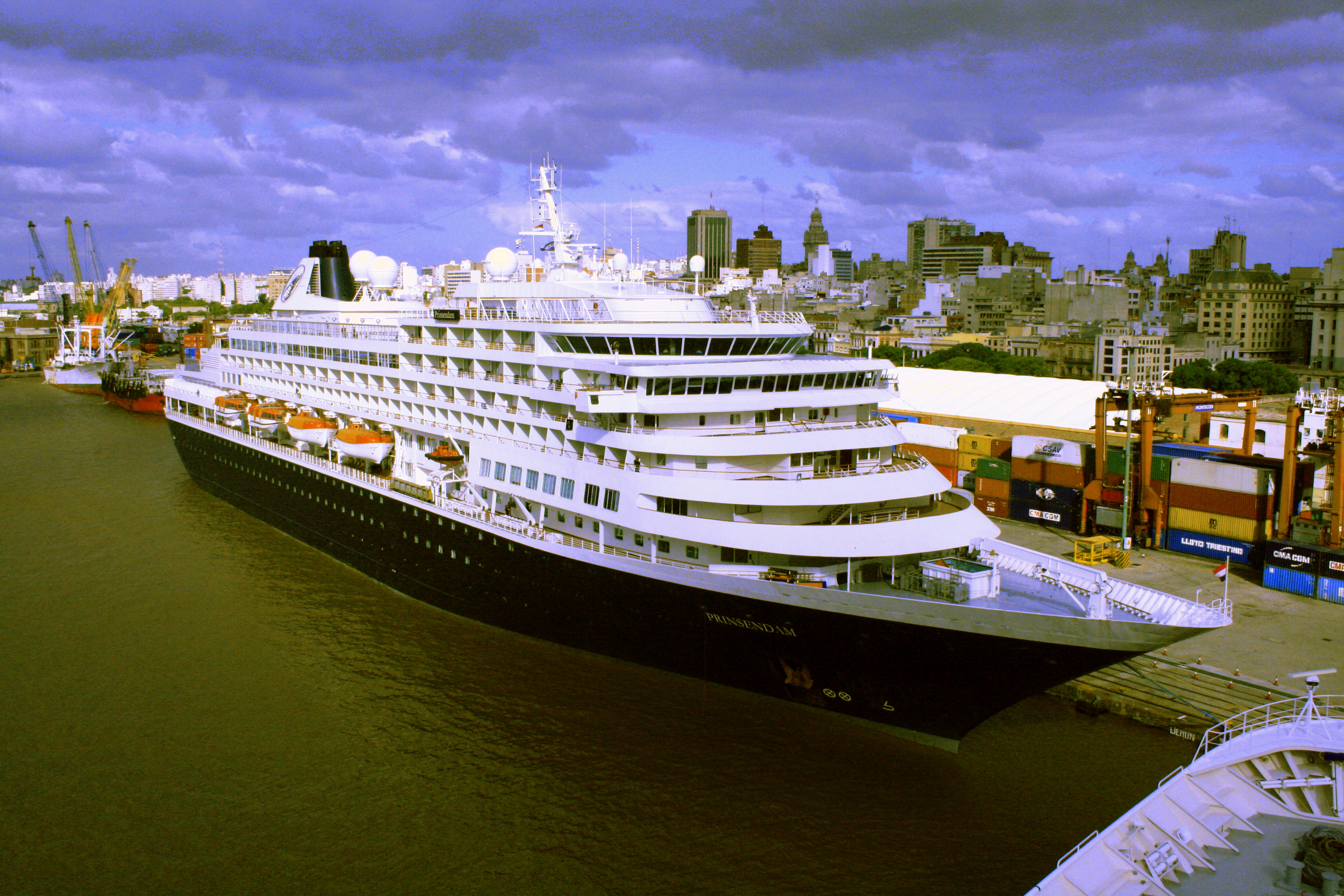
Prinsendam in the Port of Montevideo

Montevideo Bay is one of the reasons the city was founded. It gives natural protection to ships, although there are now two jetties that protect the harbour entrance of the waves. This natural port makes it competitive with the Río de la Plata's other great South American port—the Port of Buenos Aires.

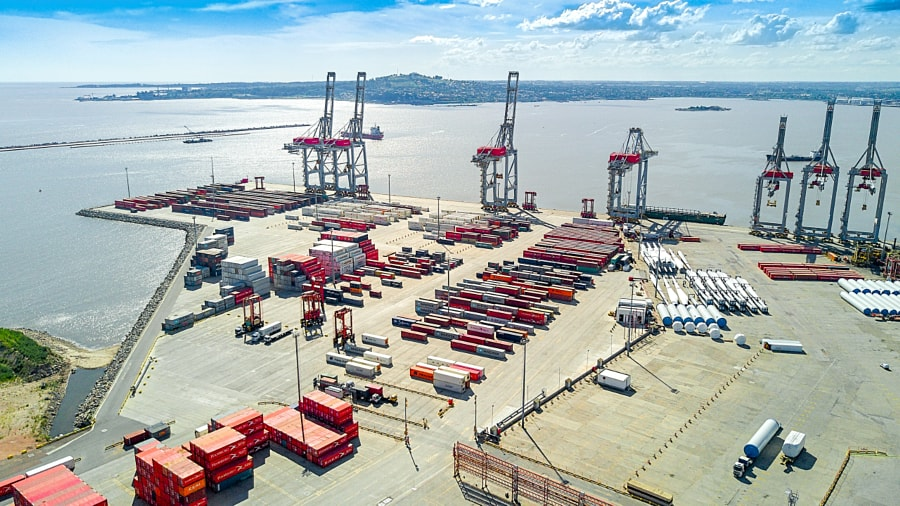
Container cranes in the port

The main engineering changes occurred between the years 1870 and 1930. During this period, built the first wooden pier, several deposits in La Aguada, north and south Rambla, a river port, a new pier, the river basin, and the La Teja Refinery. A major storm in 1923 meant that many engineering works in the city had to be repaired. Since the second half of the 20th century, physical changes have ceased, after which came a degradation of the area due to national economic stagnation.

An important architectural monument is the building of the former National Customs Directorate and Port Authority, currently the Navy General Command, designed by Jorge Herrán in 1923.

Passenger traffic at the port peaked during the era of mass immigration to Uruguay (1860–1960), when large numbers of European migrants arrived in the country, making it the principal gateway for their entry.

== Development ==
The port's proximity has contributed to the installation of various industries in the area surrounding the bay, particularly import/export businesses, and business related to port activity and naval activity. Because of the density of industrial development in the area surrounding the port, the residential popularity is relatively low. The main environmental problems are subaquatic sedimentation and air and water contamination.

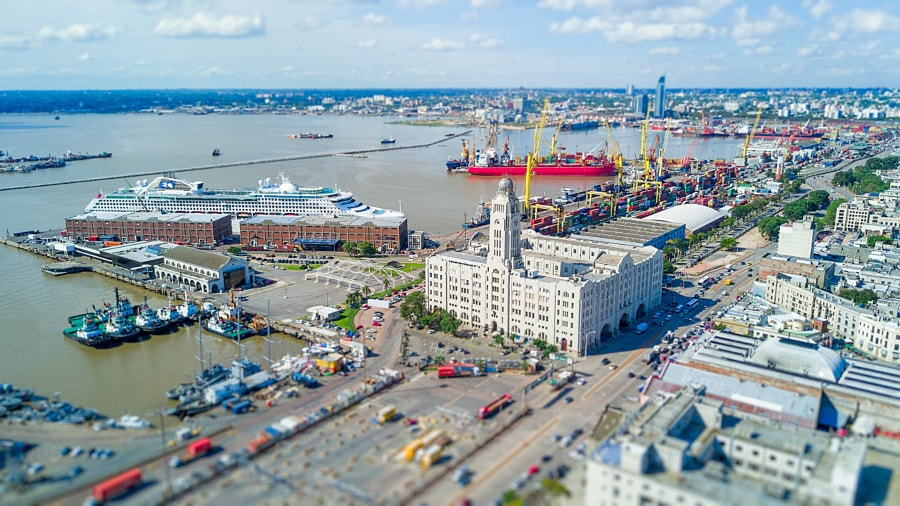
Docks

The port has been growing rapidly and consistently at an average annual rate of 14 percent due to an increase in foreign trade. The city has received a $20 million loan from the Inter-American Development Bank to modernize the port, increase its size and efficiency, and lower maritime and river transportation costs.

Katoen Natie owns an important container handling facility at this Port.

== Bibliography ==
- Gandelsman-Trier, Mijal (2008). "Old Town and Dock Area: Structural Changes in Ciudad Vieja of Montevideo". In Kokot, Waltraut; Gandelsman-Trier, Mijal; Wildner, Kathrin; Wonneberger, Astrid (eds.). Port Cities as Areas of Transition. Ethnographic Perspectives (PDF). Bielefeld: transcript-Verlag. pp. 75–98. ISBN 978-3-89942-949-7.
