= ANCAP (Uruguay) =

Uruguayan state-owned fuel company

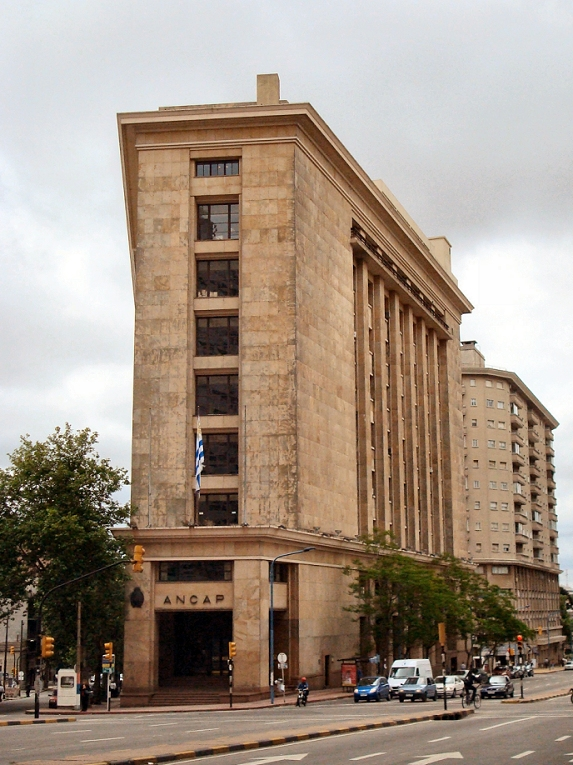
- ANCAP headquarters in Montevideo
- Type: State-owned company (Autonomous State Entity)
- Industry: Petroleum
- Area served: Uruguay
- Key people: Cecilia San Román (President); Ignacio Berti (Vice President)
- Products: Petroleum products, Portland cement and alcoholic beverages
- Revenue: US$2.006 billion (2021)
- Net income: US$88 million (2021)

ANCAP (Administración Nacional de Combustibles, Alcoholes y Portland, English: "National Administration of Fuels, Alcohols and Portland") is a state-owned company in Uruguay, it was created by Law No. 8.764, on 15 October 1931 during the administration of Gabriel Terra. Its Fundamental Law entrusts it with the power to exploit and administer the monopoly of national Alcohol and Fuel, portland cement, as well as import, refine and sell petroleum derivatives. It operates the only oil refinery in Uruguay in La Teja, inaugurated in 1937 next to its working-class neighborhood with homes with patios and gardens, President Gabriel Terra described the company as the "pride of Uruguay", it has a capacity of 50,000 barrels (7,900 m3) per day. ANCAP has a long-term corporate credit rating "BB−" with positive outlook by Standard & Poor's.

Starting in 1933, it produced an alternative fuel of national development based on gasogen (in Spanish "gasógeno") that made it possible to overcome the fuel shortage of the World War II almost without difficulties.

In December 2008, ANCAP launched Uruguay's first offshore licensing round, due for completion June 2009. It offered 11 blocks for oil and gas exploration covering areas ranging from 4,000 to 8,000 square kilometres (1,500 to 3,100 sq mi) each, with water depths ranging from 50 to 1,450 metres (160 to 4,760 ft).

In addition to Uruguay, ANCAP operates in Argentina where it owns Petrolera del Cono Sur, operating a petrol station network.

In 2017, ANCAP and UTE opened an electric vehicle network connecting Colonia del Sacramento, Rosario, Puntas de Valdez, Montevideo, San Luis and Punta del Este, with stations every 65 km. The stations at the Carrasco International Airport and Colonia have 43 kW, whereas the other stations have 22 kW.

ANCAP signed offshore exploration and production contracts in 2023 with Shell, APA Corp. and YPF.

In December 2024, ANCAP and Alcoholes del Uruguay (ALUR) signed an agreement with HIF Glocal for the implementation of a green hydrogen and synthetic fuels project in Paysandú. The estimated US$ 6 billion plant should produce 700,000 tons of renewable fuels per year when completed.

ANCAP and partner CGG Services USA Inc (Viridien) launched the seismic survey 3DUR26 on 1 March 2026. The survey will be carried out in to seasons, one from March 2026 to April 2026, and the other from November 2026 to April 2027.

In March 2026, additional contracts were signed with Chevron and QatarEnergy through Shell for Block OFF-7 and Block OFF-2.

== History ==
The National Administration of Fuels, Alcohols and Portland (ANCAP) was created by Law No. 8,764, on 15 October 1931 during the administration of Gabriel Terra. With its creation, the state monopoly on the import and refining of crude oil was established, as well as on the import and manufacture of alcohol and distilled alcoholic beverages. In addition, the installation of portland factories and related products was approved, to increase the performance of public works to, in turn, reduce unemployment caused by the crash of 1929.

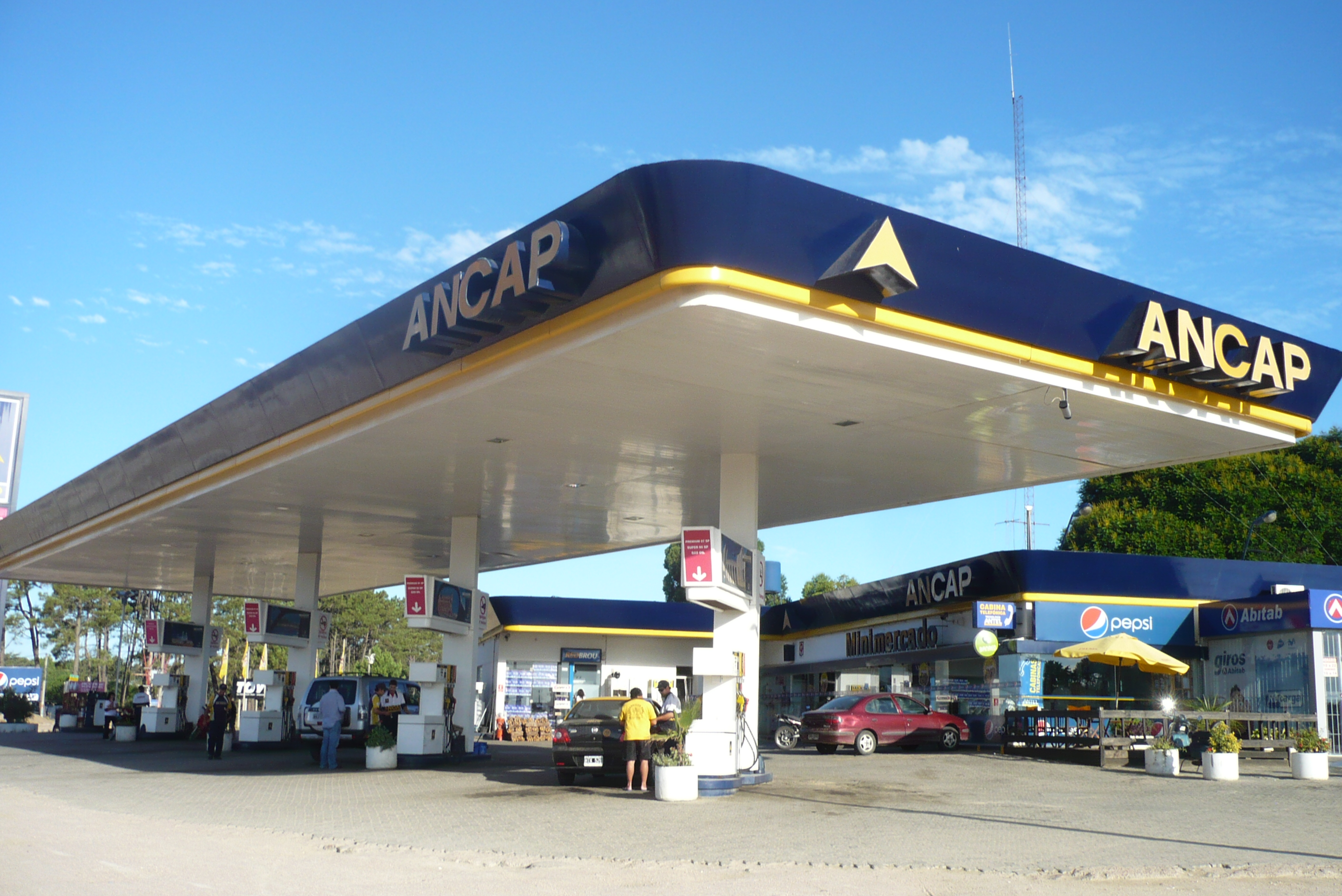
ANCAP filling station in 2011

In the 1930s, the company built its first oil facilities to serve as a distributor, as well as the La Teja Refinery that, with a refining capacity of 600 m^{3} per day, led to the cessation of imports of manufactured products. It also entered a market for refined liquid fuels, through the import and sale of products throughout the country, and the first two filling stations were installed in Montevideo. In the 1940s, due to the increase in the activity of the Uruguayan economy and the need to ensure the energy supply, the company acquired oil tankers, carried out technical reforms to increase the processing capacity of the Refinery and began negotiations to modify the agreement with private oil companies, for the supply of crude oil and for the profits guaranteed to multinational companies, for the commercialization of diesel oil, diesel oil and fuel oil.

In the 1990s, the commercialization in the country of products intended for the public began to be carried out in filling stations with the ANCAP seal under concessions to private companies such as branches.

== Headquarters ==
ANCAP's main offices are housed in the building located at the intersection of Paysandú Street and Libertador Avenue. It was designed by the architect Rafael Lorente Escudero —who also designed filling stations in both Carrasco and Punta del Este— and inaugurated in 1948.

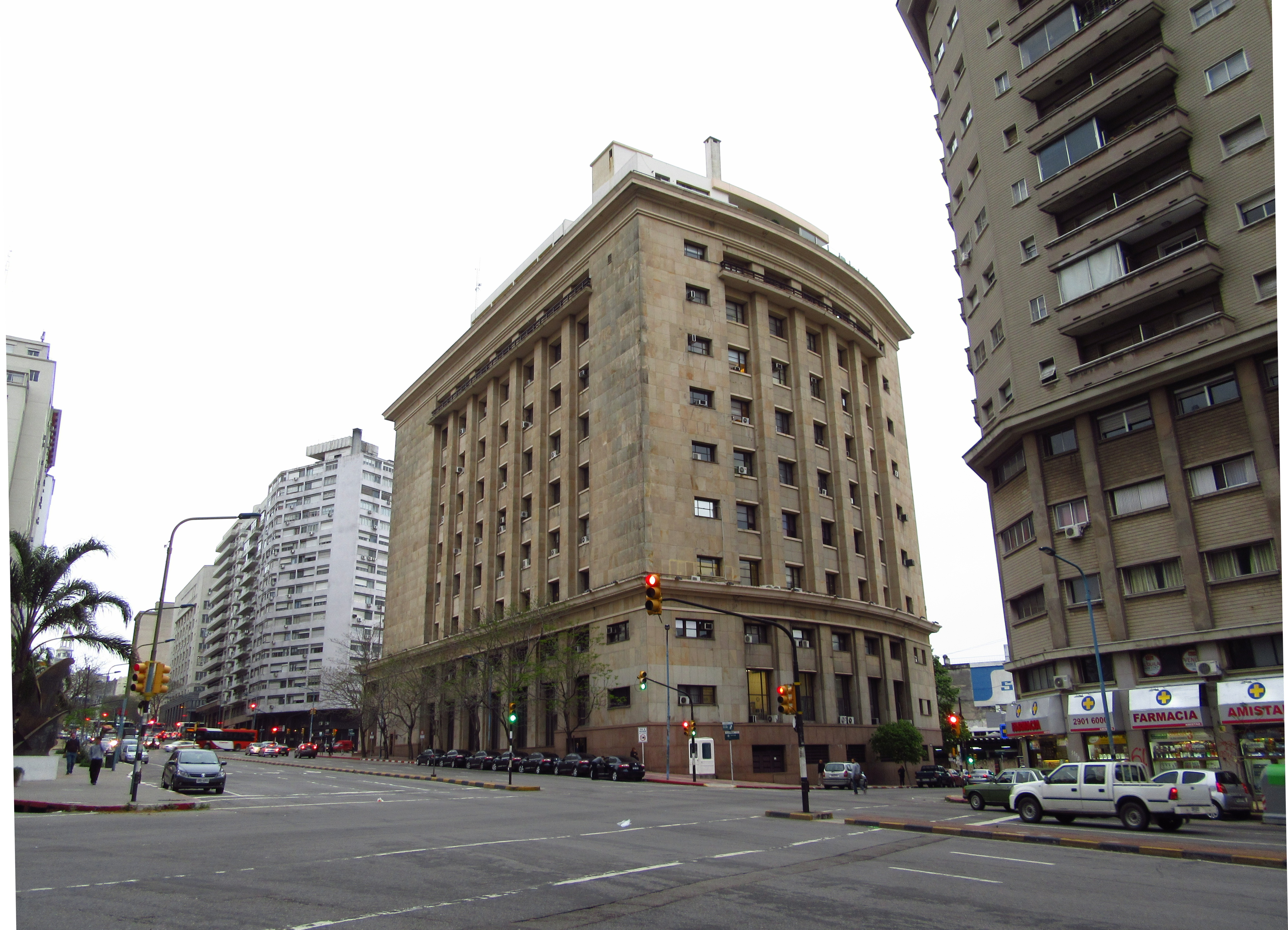
Rear of the building

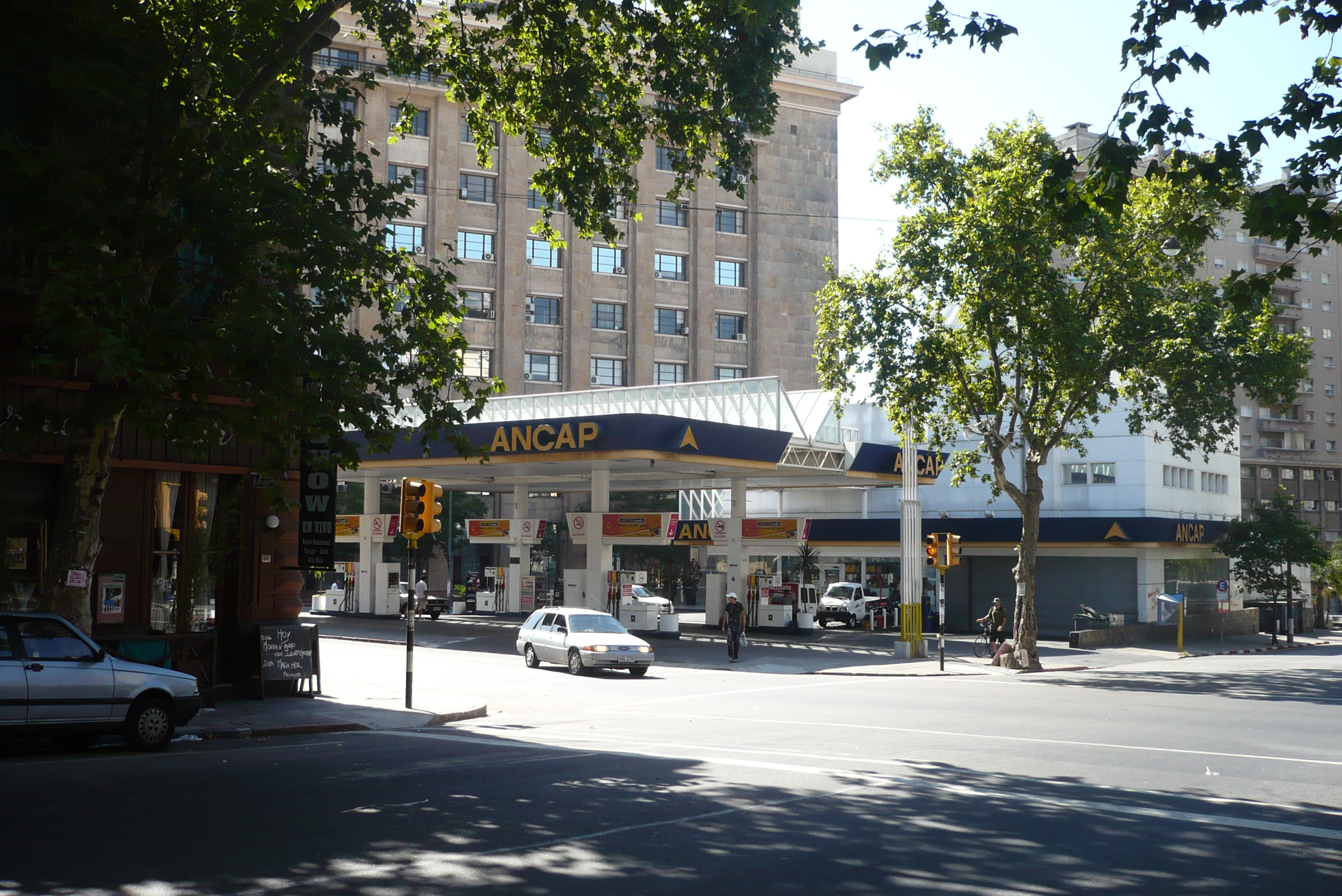
ANCAP filling station next to the headquarters

== See also ==
- Petroleum in Uruguay
- Raúl Fernando Sendic Rodríguez#ANCAP stewardship
