= Asentamiento =

Shanty towns in and around Guatemala City, and Montevideo

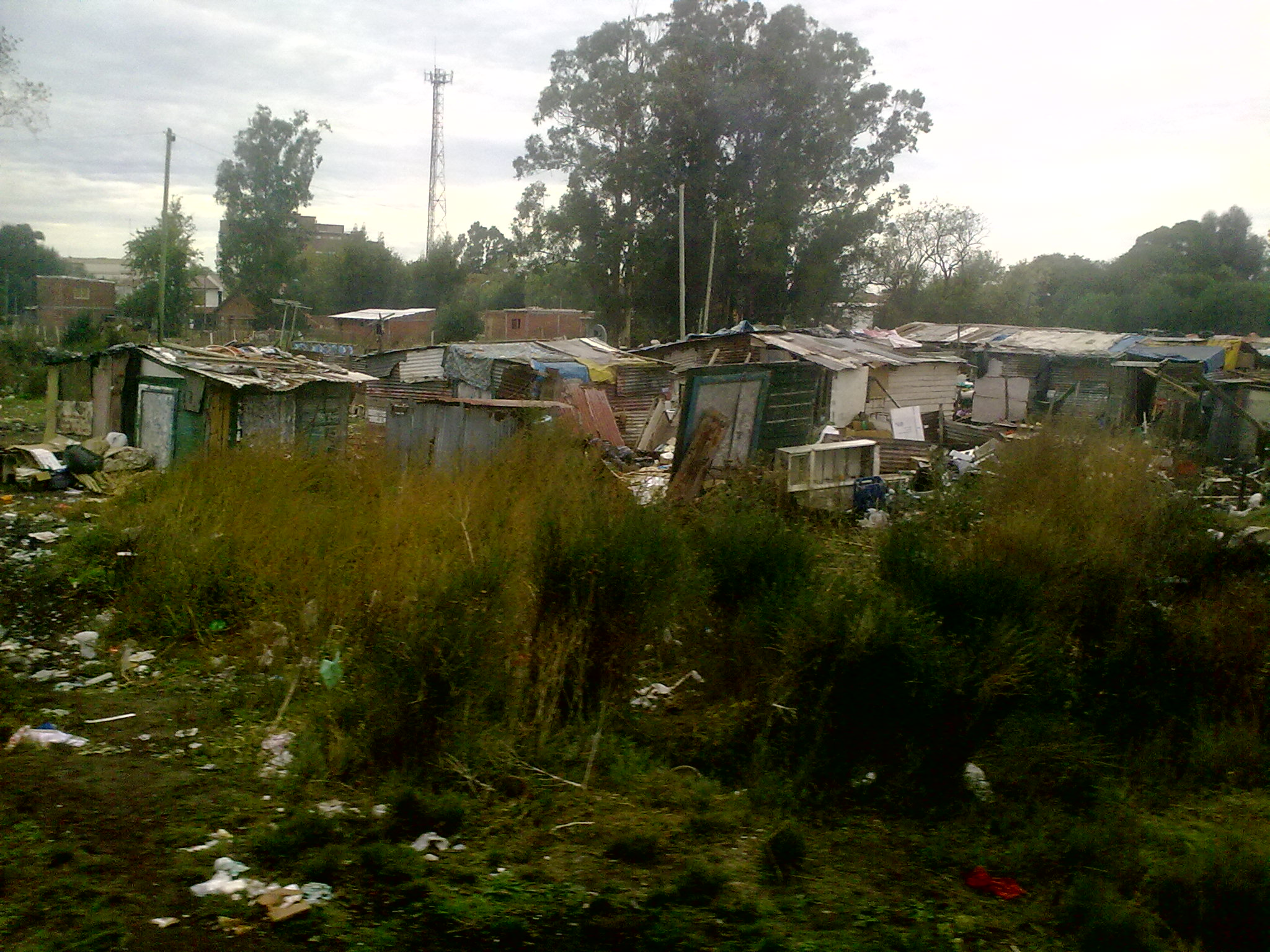
Asentamiento in Argentina

An asentamiento irregular, known colloquially as an asentamiento (Spanish pronunciation: [asentaˈmjento]) is a shanty town in Latin America, particularly around Guatemala City and Montevideo. Most have been established in the last 20 years as a result of economic inequalities between rural and metropolitan areas in Guatemala and Uruguay.

== Guatemala City ==
In 15 of the 23 districts of Guatemala City, there are precarious settlements. In 1984, there were 103 and by 1991 there were 232. In 2016 there were 297. In 1984, 800 families made a land invasion and successfully squatted an area called El Mezquital. The settlement eventually swelled to over 25,000 people. It was the first successful occupation since 1976.

These places have been considered "red zones" inside Guatemala City, because of their high crime rate and some of them are El Caracol, Cañaverales, El Rinconcito. A famous asentamiento in Guatemala is La Limonada. With a population of around 60,000 it is one of the largest slums in Latin America outside Brazil.

== Montevideo ==
In Montevideo, Uruguay before 1990, there were land occupations known as cantegriles. The land invasions can be split into accretions (gradual, individual actions) and planned (organised, collective actions). Gradually, cantegril has come to refer to the poorest of shanty towns, whilst groups of houses on squatted land are known more generally as asentamientos irregulares or asentamientos in short.
