= Paso de la Arena =

Paso de la Arena–Santiago Vázquez
- Barrio
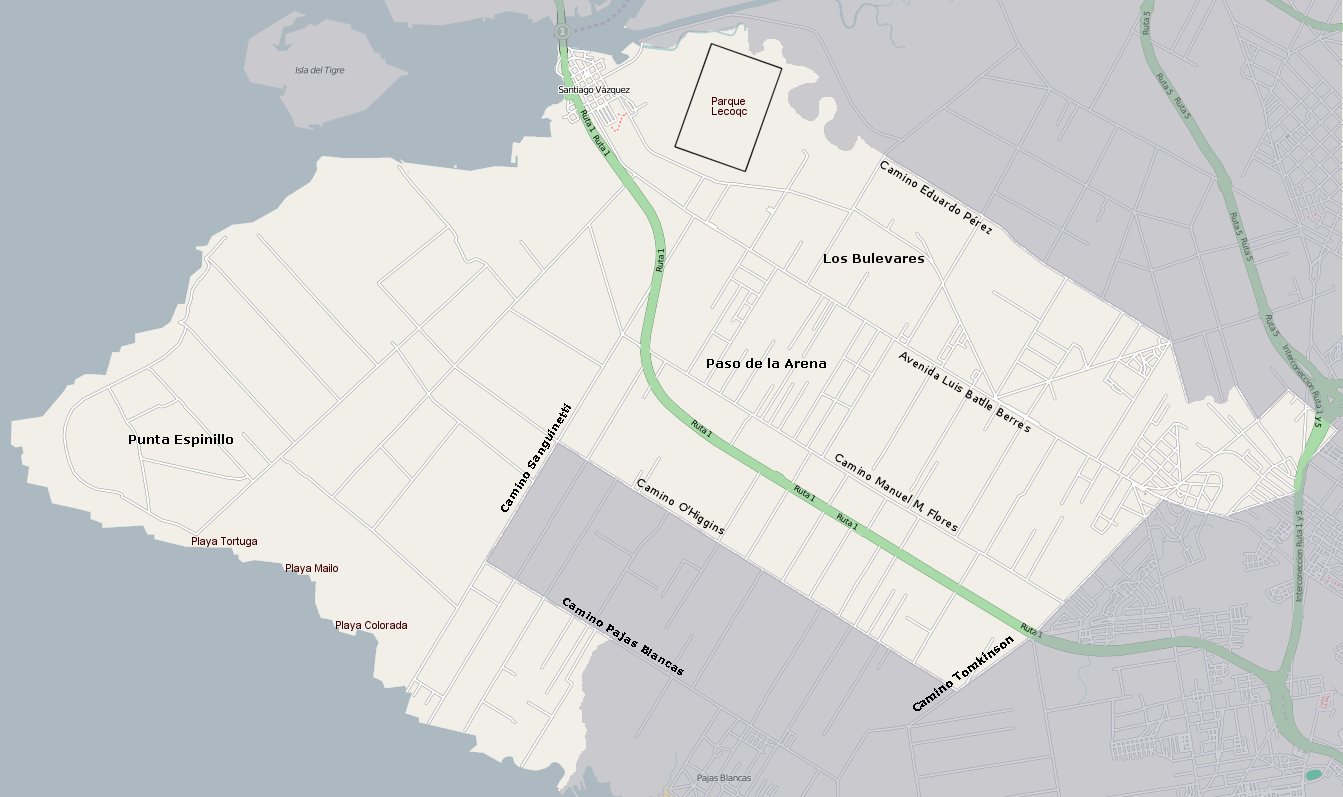
- Street map of Paso de la Arena

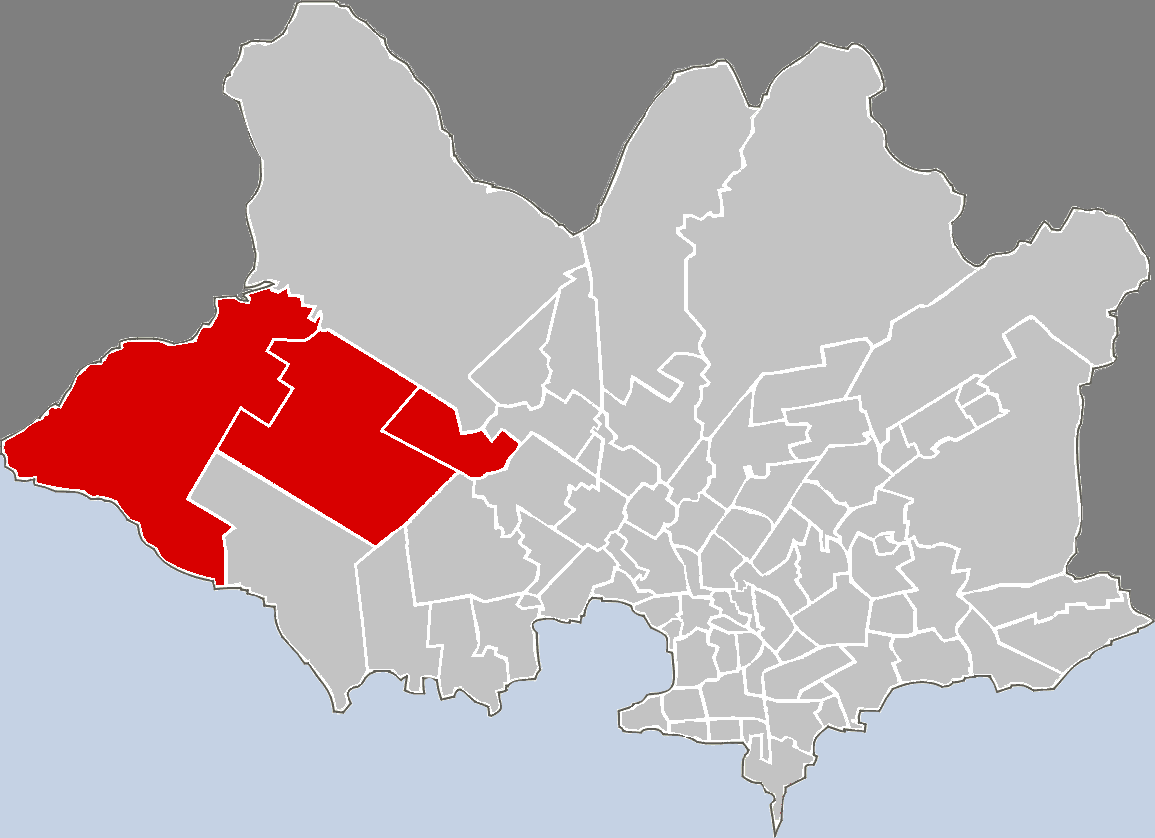
- Location of Paso de la Arena in Montevideo
- Coordinates: 34°49′13″S 56°20′26″W
- Country: Uruguay
- Department: Montevideo Department
- City: Montevideo

Paso de la Arena, also known by the composite name Paso de la Arena–Los Bulevares–Rincón del Cerro–Santiago Vázquez is a barrio (neighbourhood or district) of Montevideo, Uruguay. It shares borders with Lezica–Melilla and Conciliación to the north and northeast, with Nuevo París and La Paloma–Tomkinson to the east and southeast, with Casabó–Pajas Blancas to the south and with the Río de la Plata to the southwest, west and northwest.

== Overview ==
It is home to the Parque Lecocq, a park and a zoo, and Parque Punta Espinillo, a seaside recreation area. On its south side there are several beaches including Playa Tortuga, Playa Malo and Playa La Colorada.

Los Bulevares is an area north of the Ruta 1 highway, while Rincón del Cerro is an extended area south of the Ruta 1 and is only partly included in this composite barrio, while part of it is also included in the neighbouring barrios Casabó–Pajas Blancas and La Paloma–Tomkinson.

== Places of worship ==
- Parish Church of Jesus the Worker, Av. Luis Batlle Berres 6748 (Roman Catholic)
- Parish Church of the Immaculate Conception, Cno. de la Capilla 3853 (Roman Catholic)

== Santiago Vázquez ==
Santiago Vázquez is on the mouth of Santa Lucia river (Barra de Santa Lucia). It is home to the Athletic Club Aleman de Remo and to the Yacht Club de Remo. Two bridges, an older one and a newer one, join it with the San José Department. South of Santiago Vázquez is the homonymous detention facility and further southwest, at the westernmost point of Montevideo Department, is the municipal Park of Punta Espinillo.

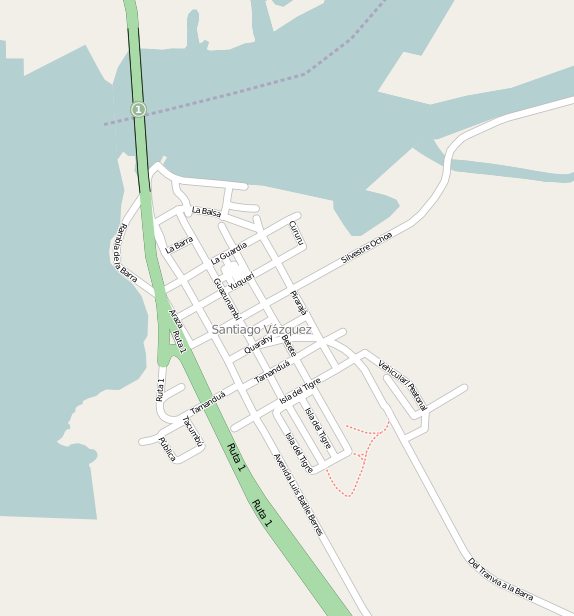
Street map of Santiago Vázquez

== See also ==
- Barrios of Montevideo
