= La Paloma, Montevideo =

La Paloma - Tomkinson
- Barrio
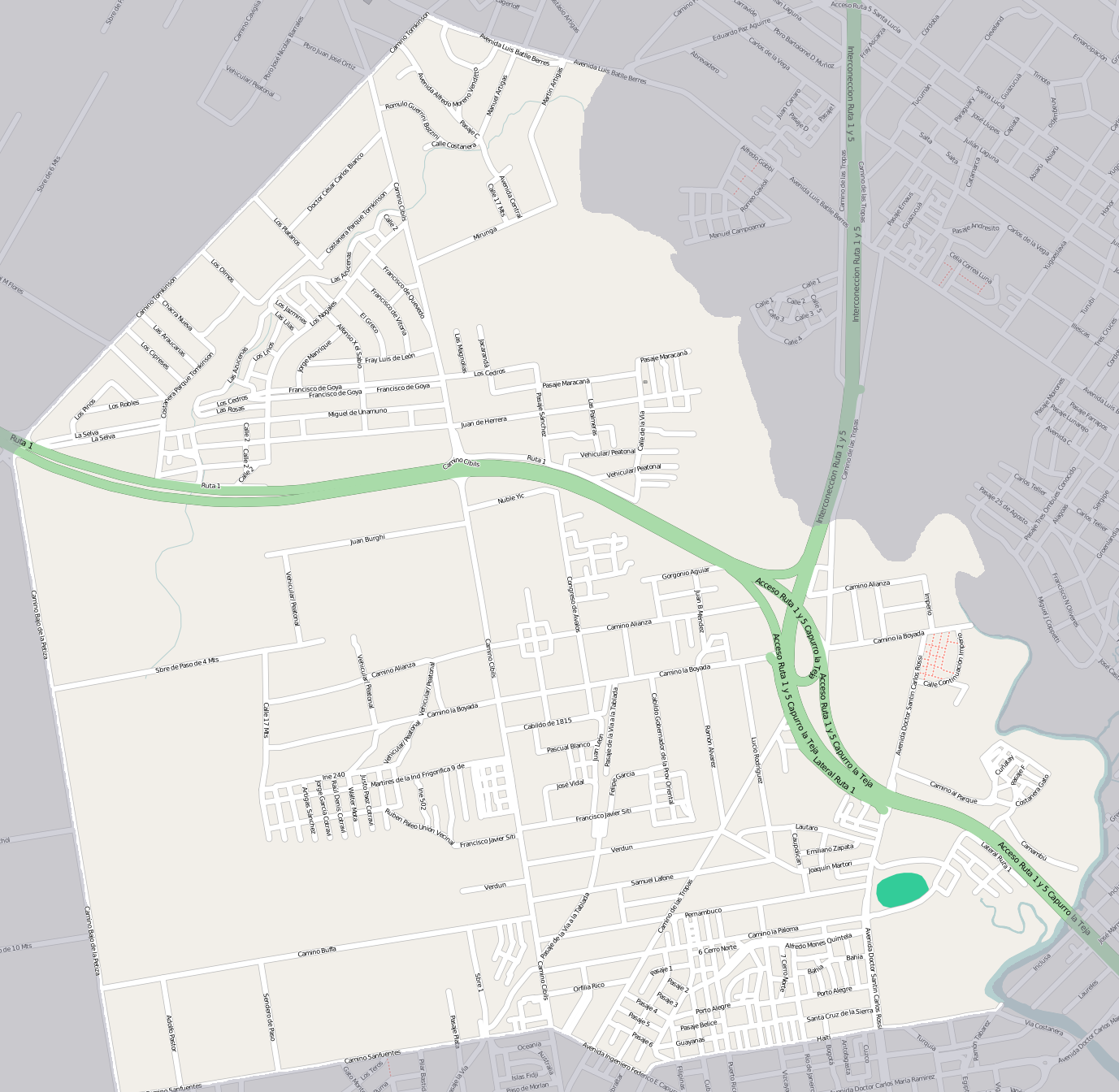
- Street map of La Paloma - Tomkinson

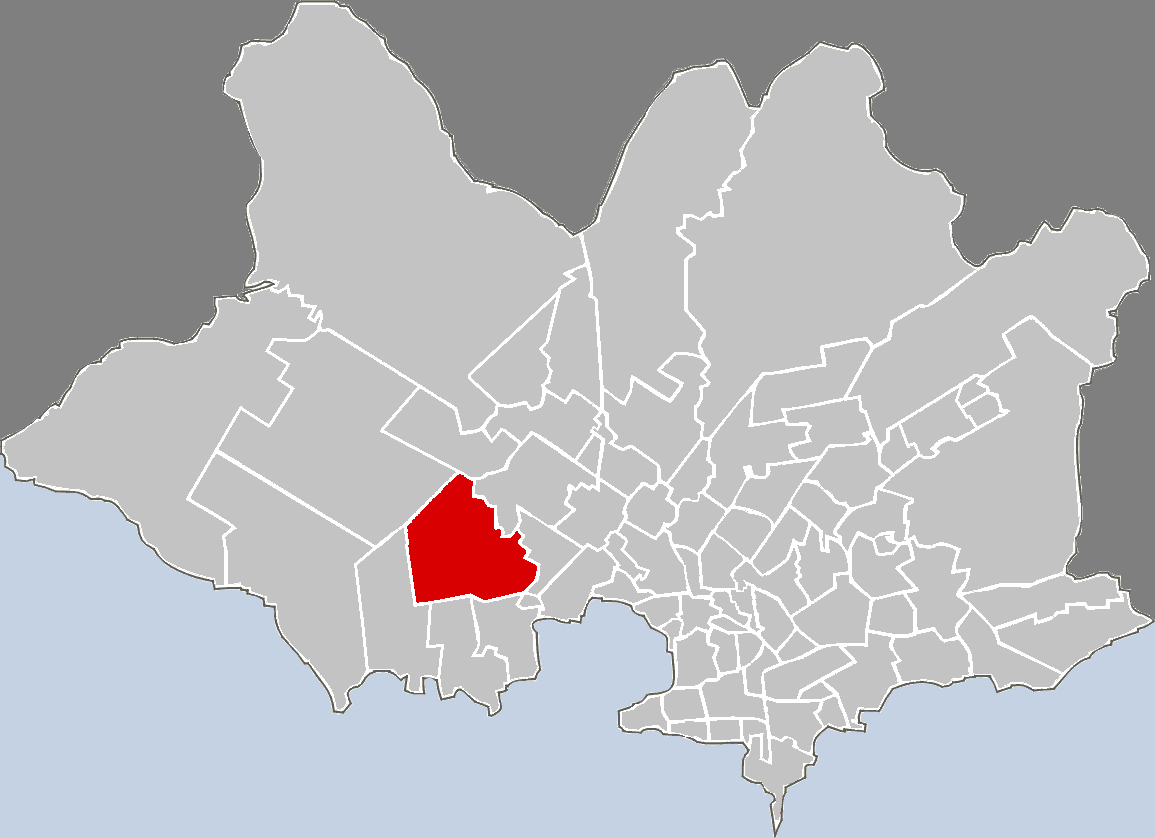
- Location of La Paloma - Tomkinson in Montevideo
- Coordinates: 34°51′37″S 56°16′6″W
- Country: Uruguay
- Department: Montevideo Department
- City: Montevideo

La Paloma - Tomkinson is a barrio (neighbourhood or district) of Montevideo, Uruguay.

== Location ==
It shares borders with Villa del Cerro to the south, Casabó to the south and west, Paso de la Arena to the north, Nuevo París and Tres Ombúes–Pueblo Victoria to the east. La Paloma is a northern extension of the Villa del Cerro, while Tomkinson is mostly north of Route 1.

== See also ==
- Barrios of Montevideo
