= Coat of arms of Uruguay =

South American coat of arms

Versions
- 1829-1906
- Armiger: Oriental Republic of Uruguay
- Adopted: 19 March 1829
- Crest: A Sun of May or
- Shield: Quarterly the 1st: Azure, a Scales of Justice or; the 2nd: Argent in base Barry wavy Argent and Azure, a representation of the Cerro de Montevideo (Montevideo Hill) with its fortress on the summit proper; the 3rd: Argent, a horse Sable; the 4th: Azure, an ox Or.
- Other elements: The oval is surrounded by a laurel branch on the left and an olive one on the right, joined at the bottom by a blue ribbon or a tie through the leaves/branches

The coat of arms of Uruguay was first adopted by law on March 19, 1829, by the General Constituent Assembly. Later on it had some minor modifications in 1906 and 1908. It was supposedly designed by Juan Manuel Besnes Irigoyen.

== Description and meaning ==
It consists of an oval shield, which is divided into four equal sections and crowned by a rising golden sun, the Sun of May, symbolizing the rising of the Uruguayan nation and the May Revolution. The oval is surrounded by a laurel branch on the left and an olive one on the right, symbolising triumph and peace respectively, tied at the bottom by a light blue ribbon, the former uruguayan cockade.

In the upper left quarter there is a golden scale on a blue background, symbol of equality and justice.

The upper right quarter contains the Cerro de Montevideo (Montevideo Hill) with its fortress on top on a silver background, as a symbol of strength.

In the lower left, also on a silver background, there is a galloping black horse, symbolizing liberty.

The lower right quarter holds a golden ox on blue background, as a symbol of abundance and plenty.

== Modifications ==
From 1829 the coat of arms was ornamented with multiple Uruguayan Flags on each side and weapons. The wreath was made of oak. In 1906 the design was simplified and standardized by law, eliminating all ornaments.

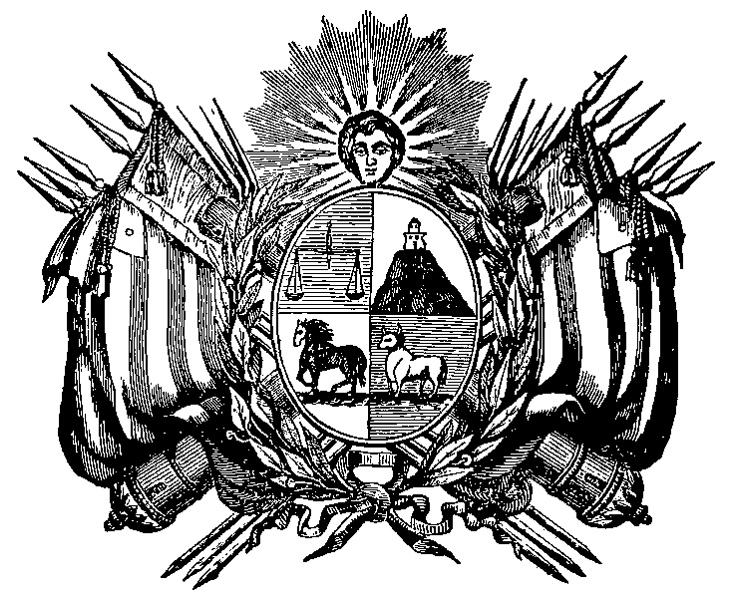

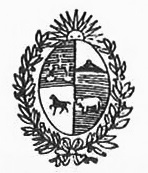

== Historical coats of arms ==
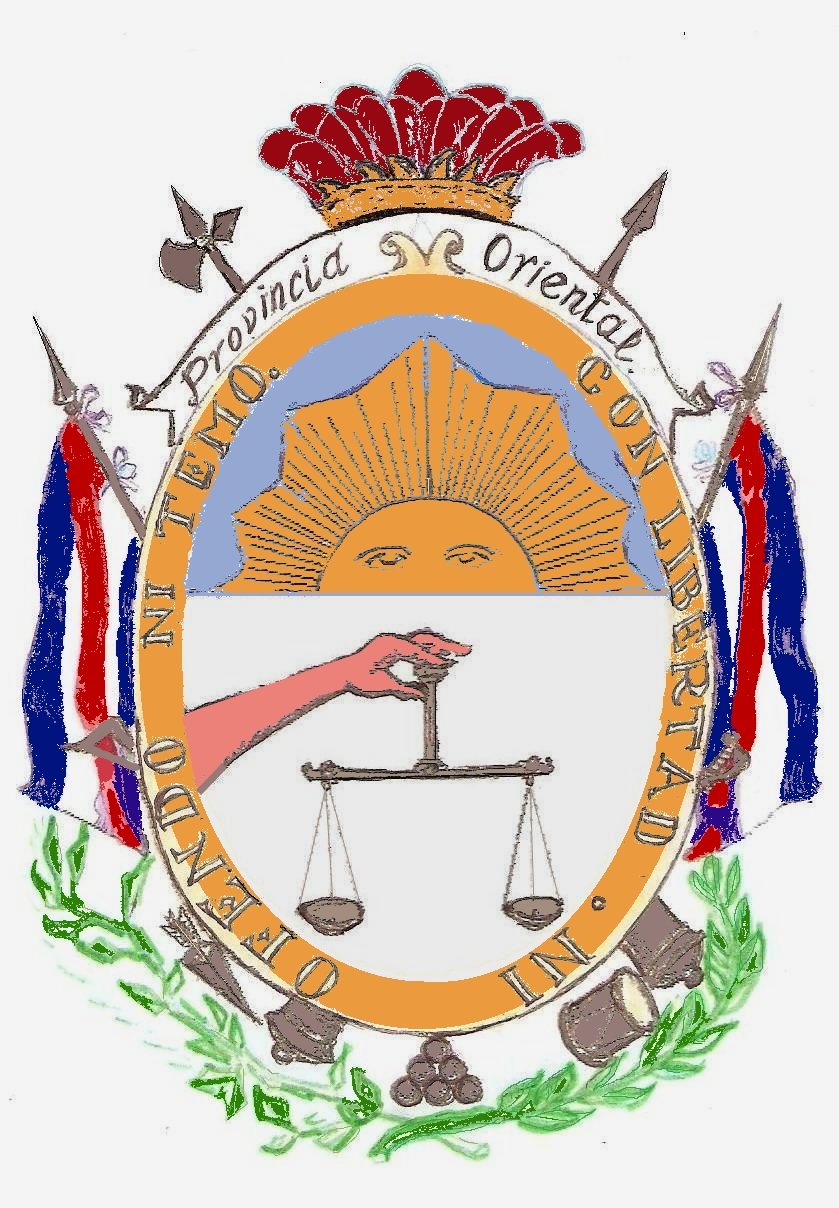
Coat of arms of the Oriental Province (1815-1817)

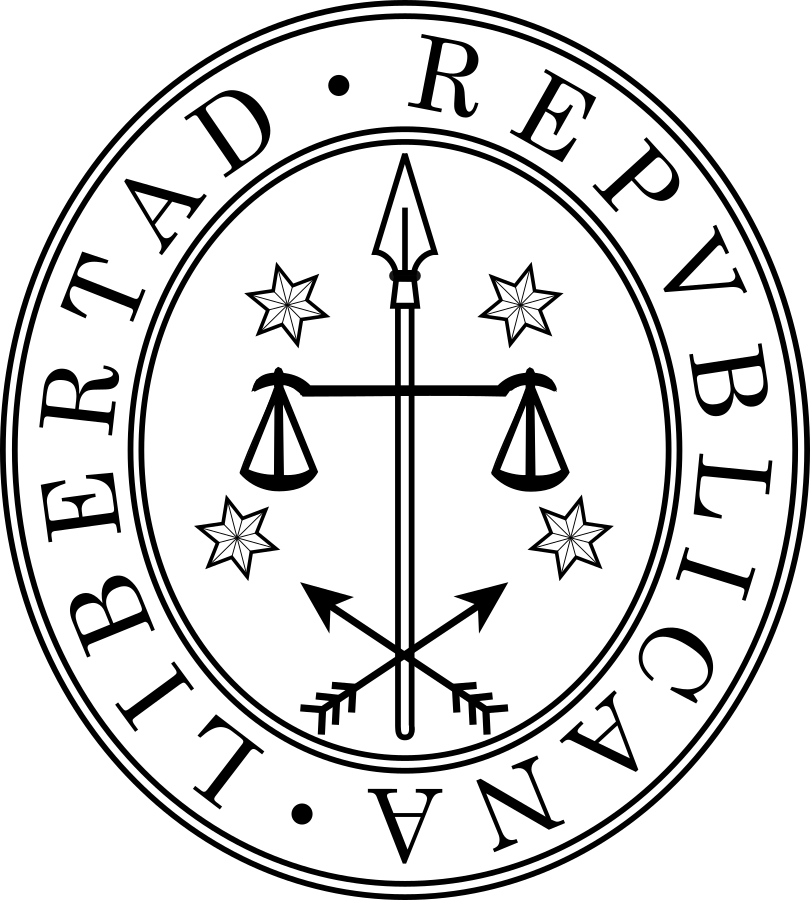
Seal of the Oriental Province (1817)

Oriental State of Uruguay (1829-1906)

== Departamental shields ==
Artigas

Canelones

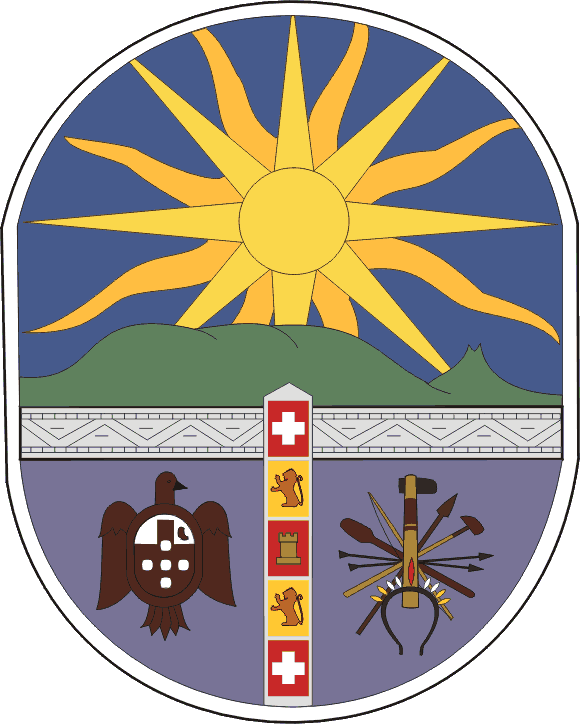
Cerro Largo

Colonia

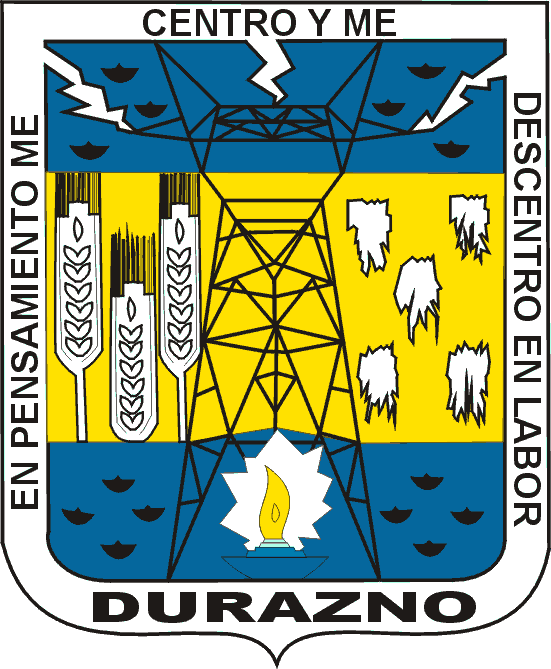
Durazno

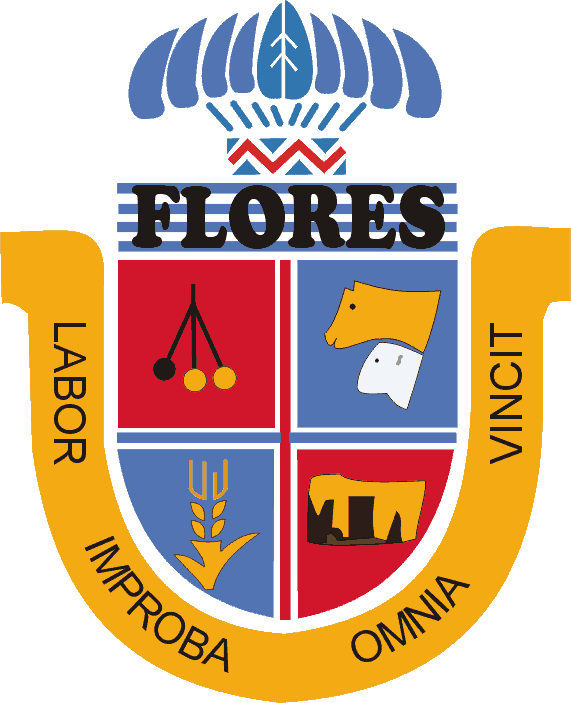
Flores

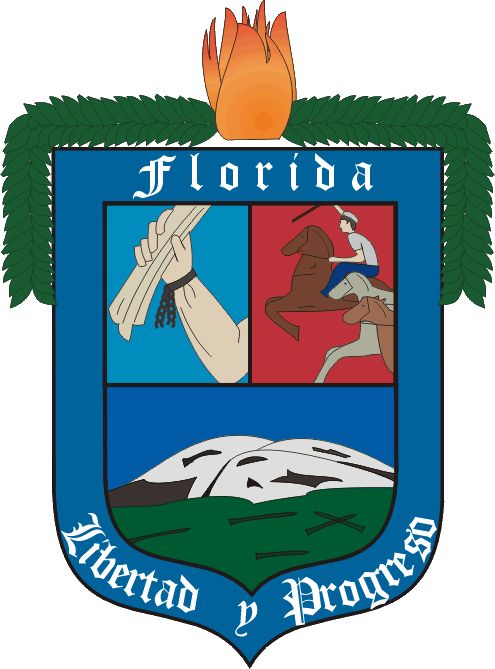
Florida

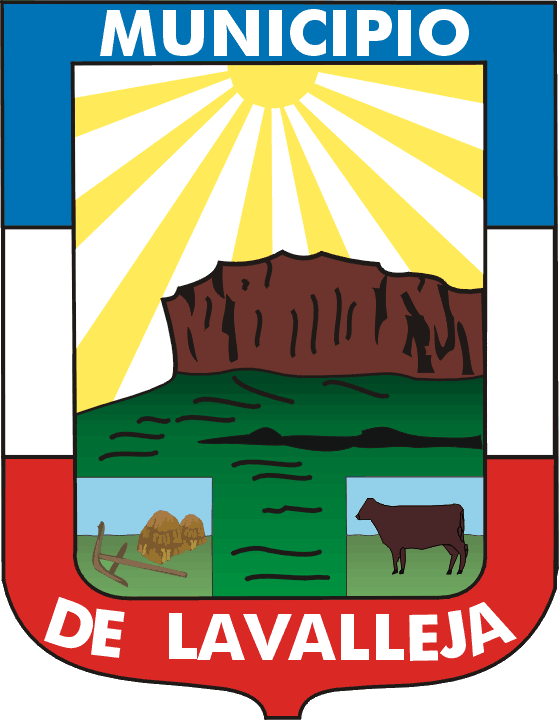
Lavalleja

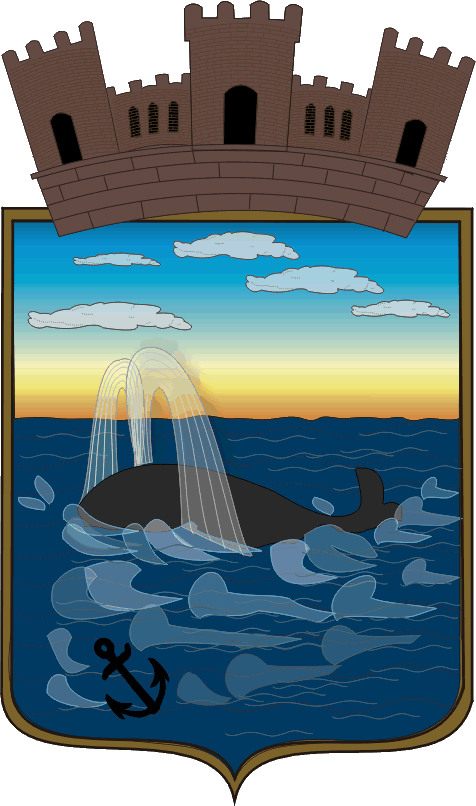
Maldonado

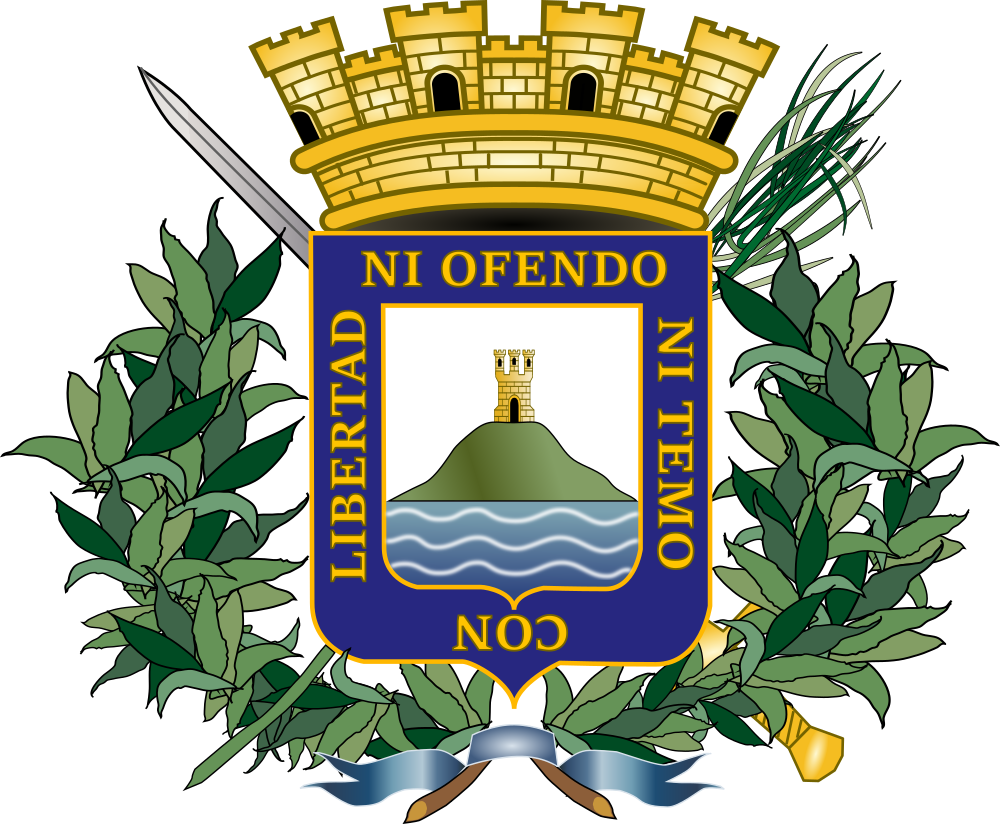
Montevideo

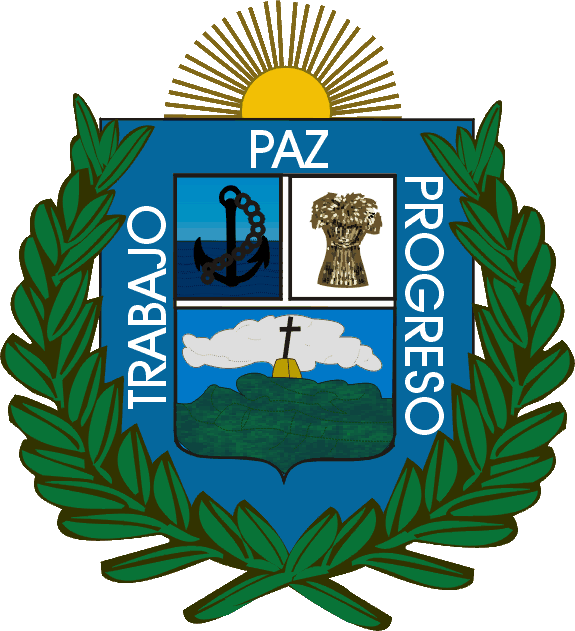
Paysandú

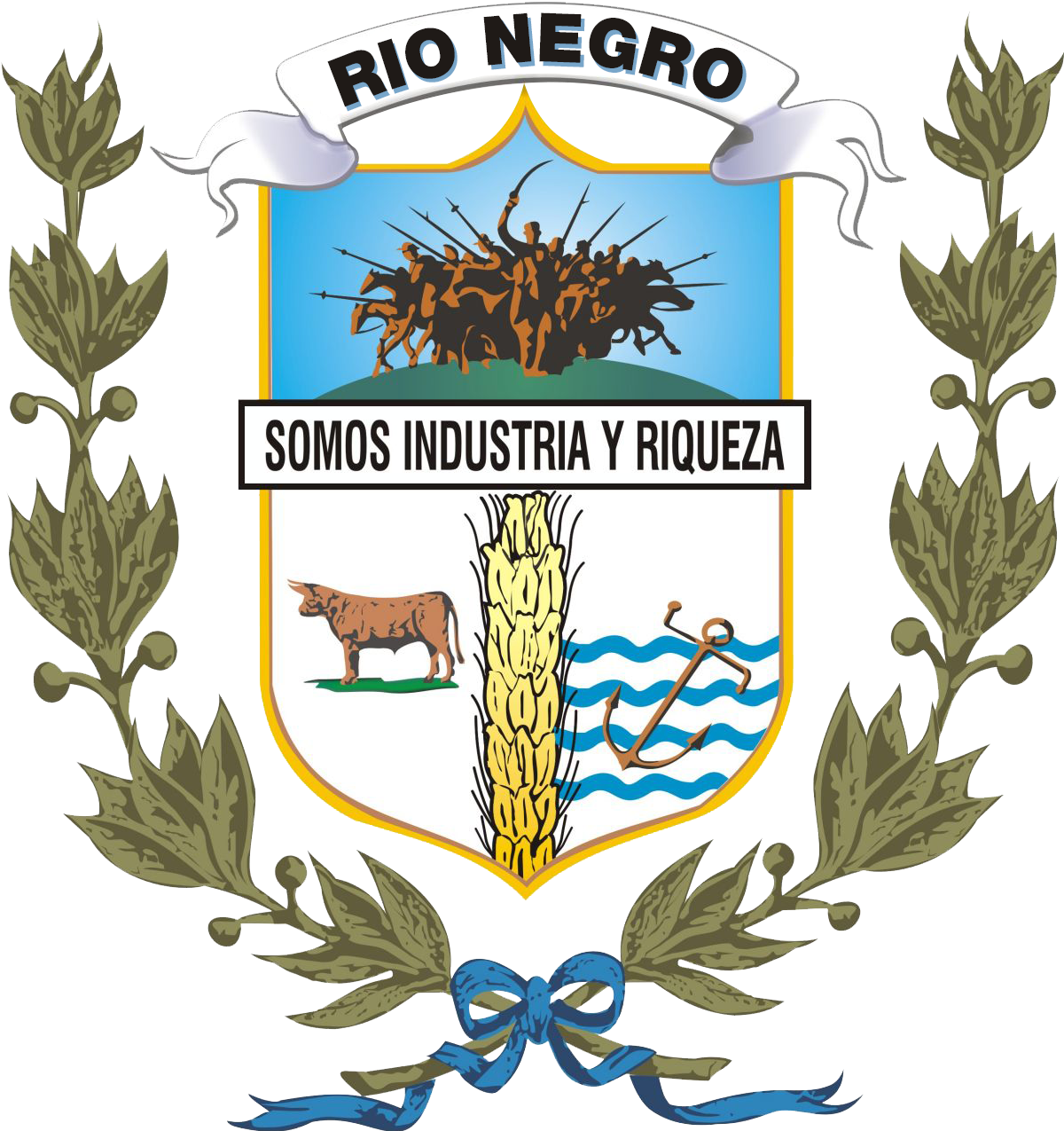
Río Negro

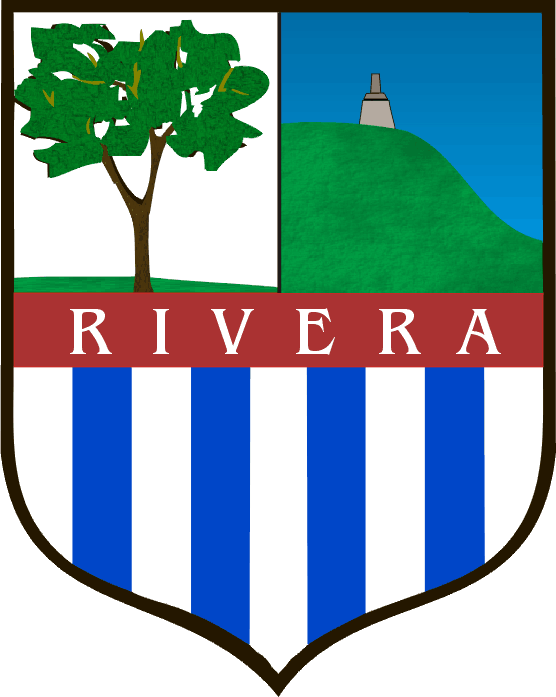
Rivera

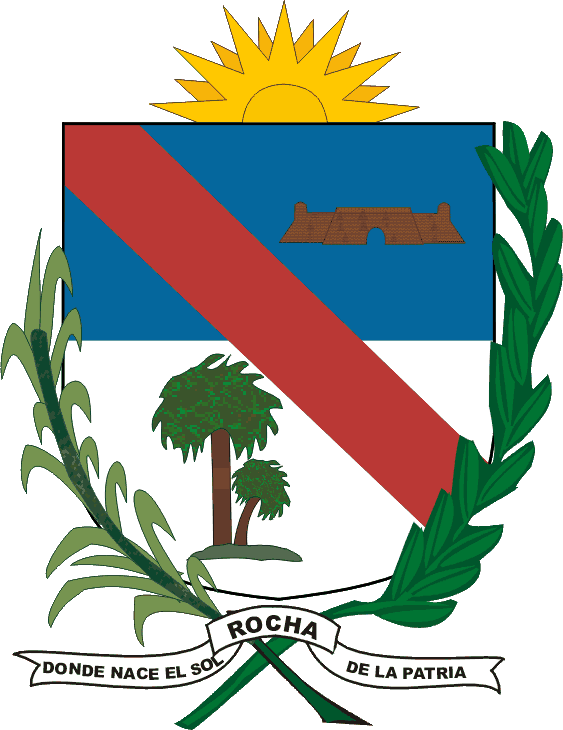
Rocha

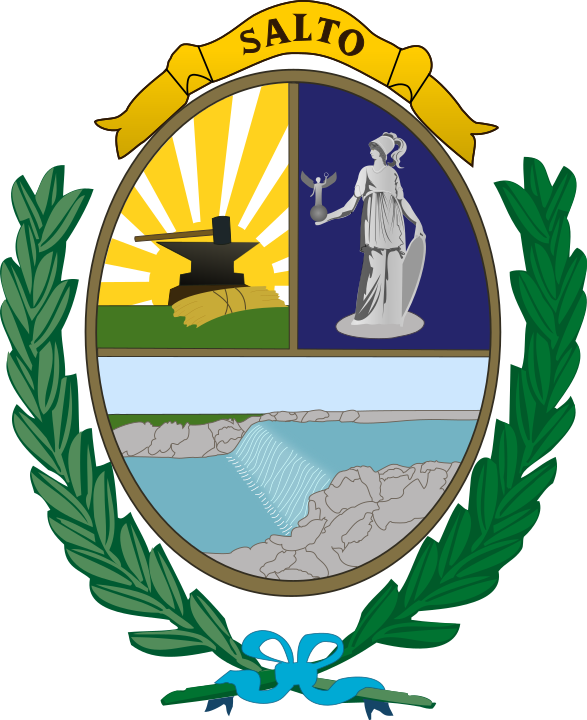
Salto

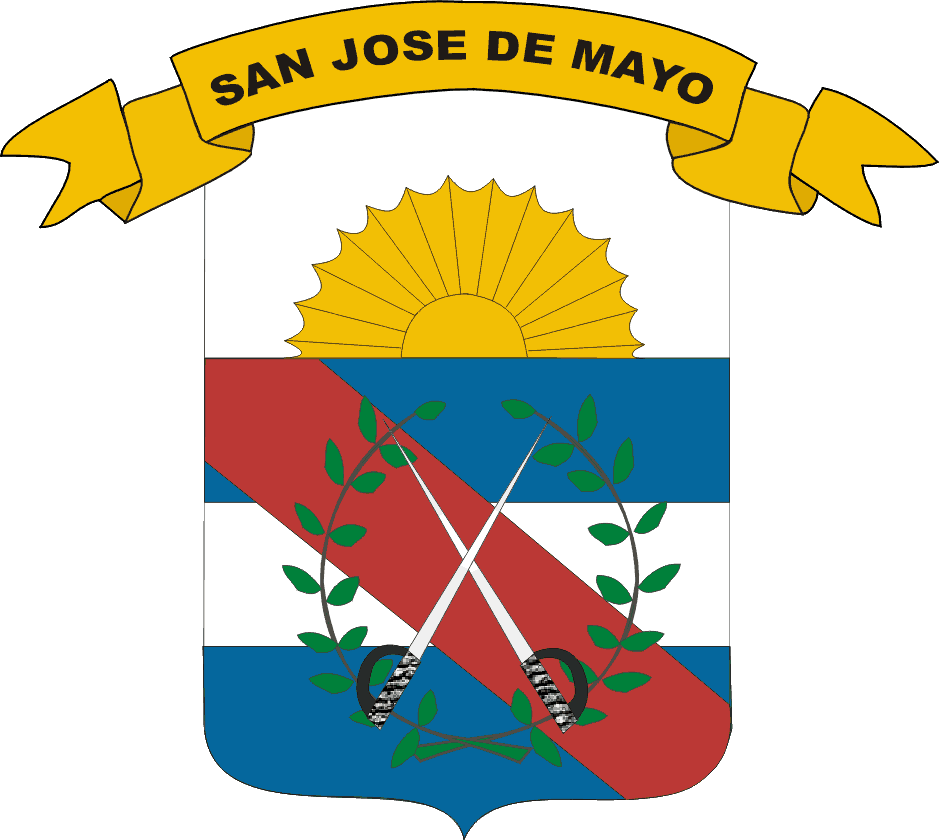
San José

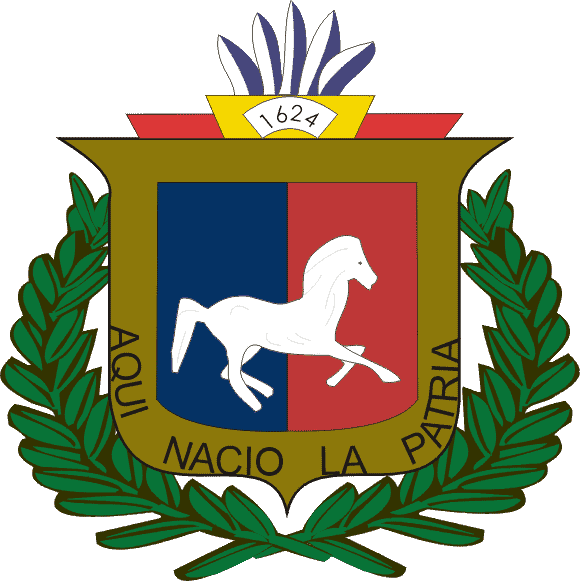
Soriano

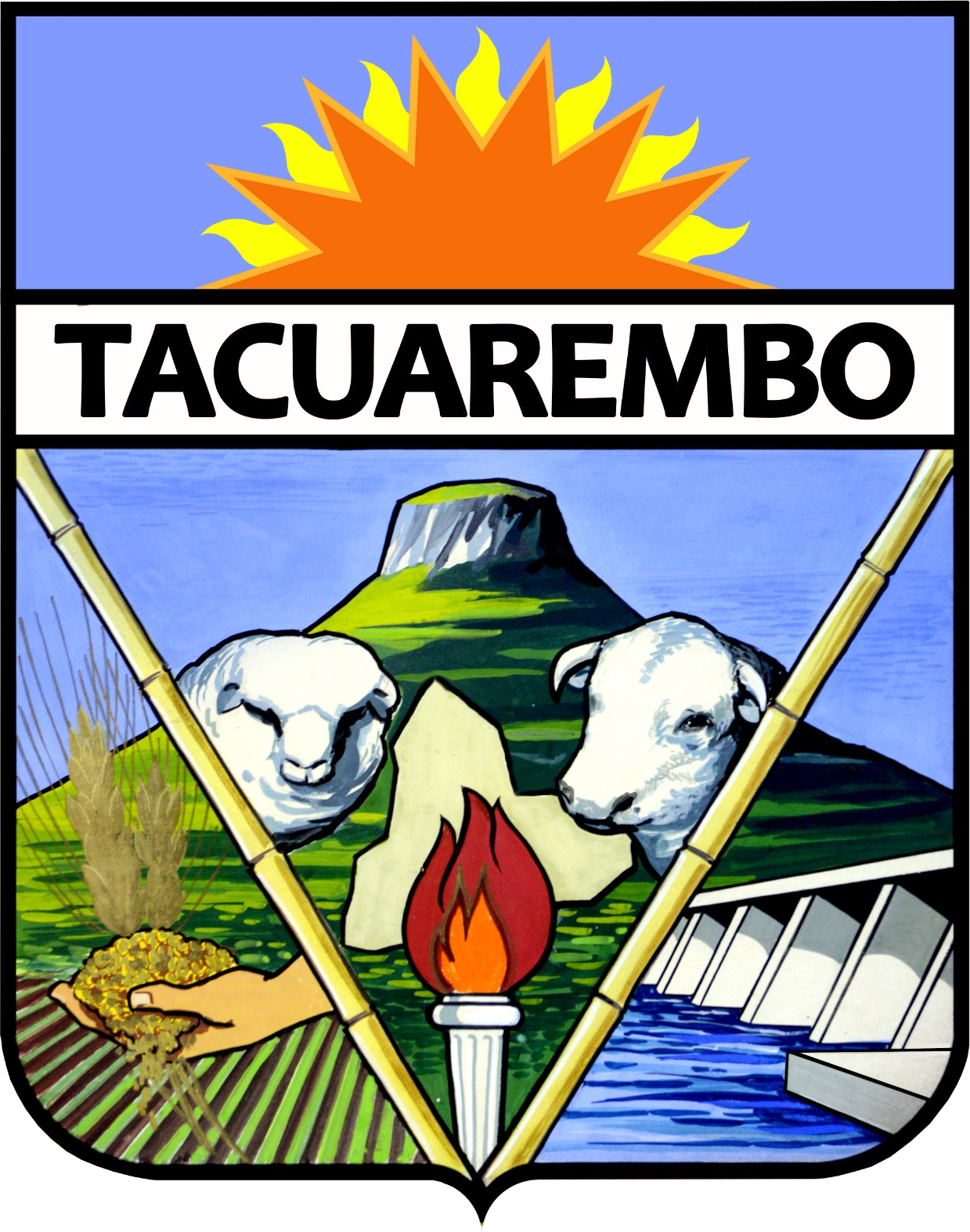
Tacuarembó

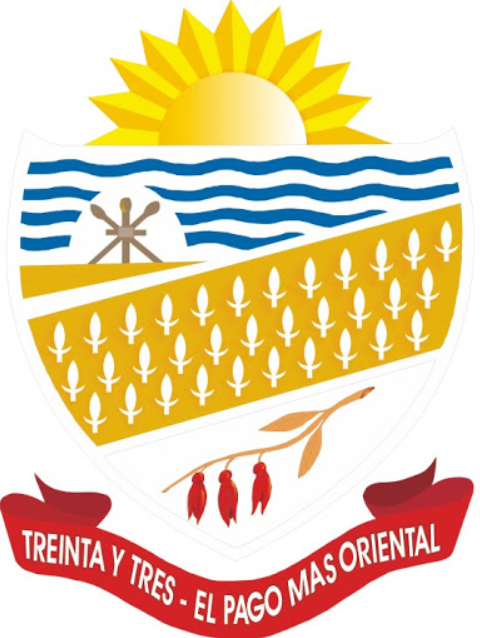
Treinta y Tres

== See also ==
- Flag of Uruguay
- Sun of May § Historical reference

== Sources ==
- Heraldry of the World: Uruguay
- FlagsoftheWorld.com: Uruguay coat of arms
