= Cementerio del Cerro, Montevideo =

Cemetery in Uruguay

Cementerio del Cerro
- Interactive map of Cementerio del Cerro

Details
- Established: 1868
- Location: Bulgaria 3945; Montevideo
- Country: Uruguay
- Coordinates: 34.8833°S 56.2645°W
- Type: municipal
- Owned by: Intendencia de Montevideo
- Find a Grave: Cementerio del Cerro

Cementerio del Cerro is a cemetery in Montevideo, Uruguay. It is located in the barrio of Villa del Cerro, behind the Fortress. It was established in 1868.
