= Cerro de Montevideo =

Hill in Montevideo Department, Uruguay

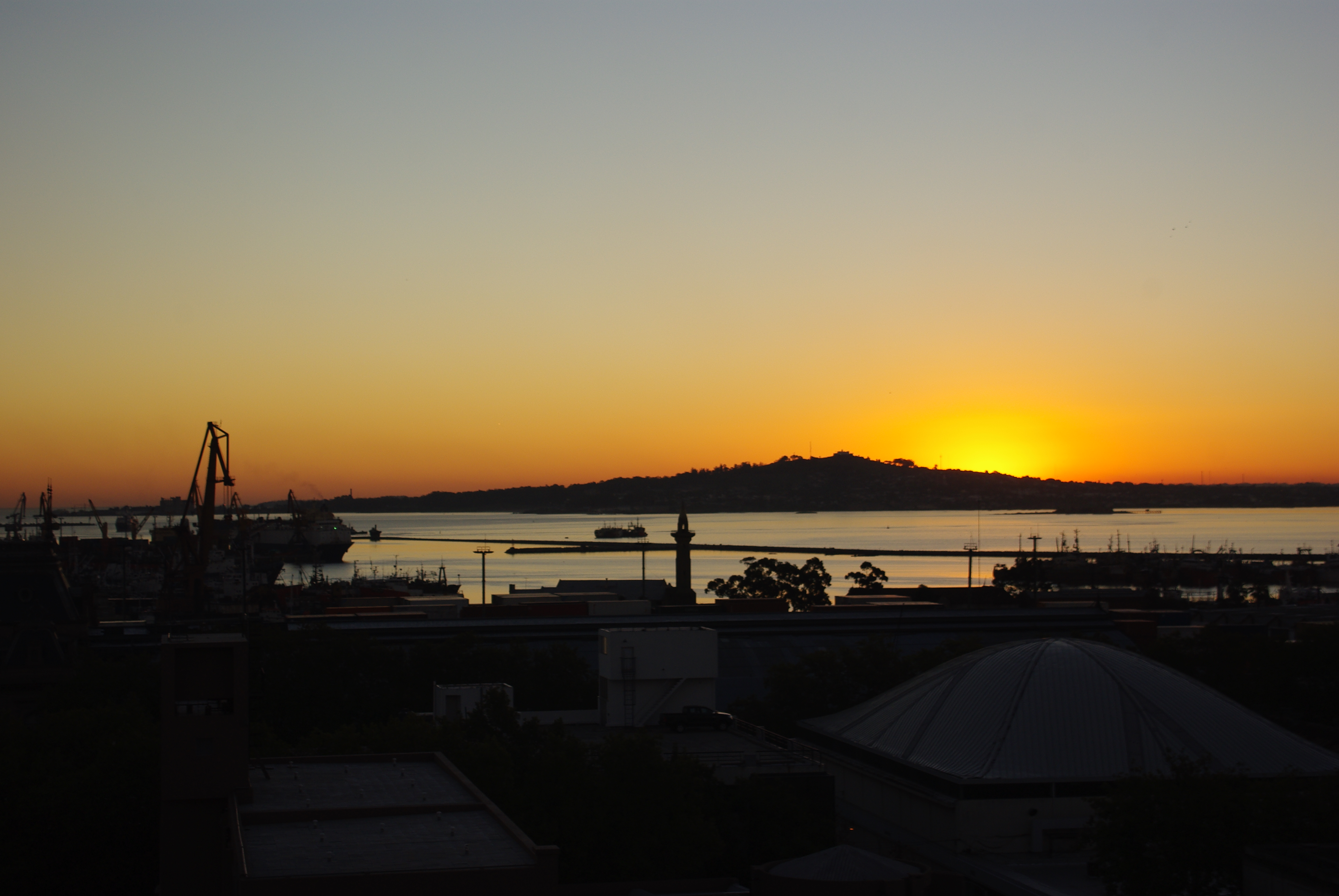
- View of the Bay and Hill of Montevideo at dusk, ca. 2011.

Highest point
- Elevation: 132 m (433 ft)
- Coordinates: 34°53′18″S 56°15′36″W

Naming
- English translation: Cerro (Hill in Spanish); Montevideo has a disputed origin
- Language of name: Spanish

Geography
- Location within Uruguay
- Location: Montevideo Department, Uruguay
- Parent range: none

Geology
- Mountain type: Hill

Climbing
- Easiest route: Automobile

Cerro de Montevideo is a hill overlooking the namesake capital city of Uruguay. It constitutes an isolated landform, it is part of no mountain range.

The fortress on top overlooks the Bay of Montevideo, a natural harbour on the coast of the River Plate. Its lighthouse is of importance for navigation.

== History ==
This hill was discovered by Europeans during the Magellan expedition. There are several theories concerning the name "Montevideo".

In the 1830s a decree established Villa Cosmópolis, afterwards Villa del Cerro, full of immigrants from all over Europe.

== Heraldry ==
In the coat of arms of Uruguay, this hill with its fortress is featured in the upper right corner on a silver background, as a symbol of strength.

Since Spanish colonial times, the city of Montevideo has seen a series of coats of arms which include this hill:

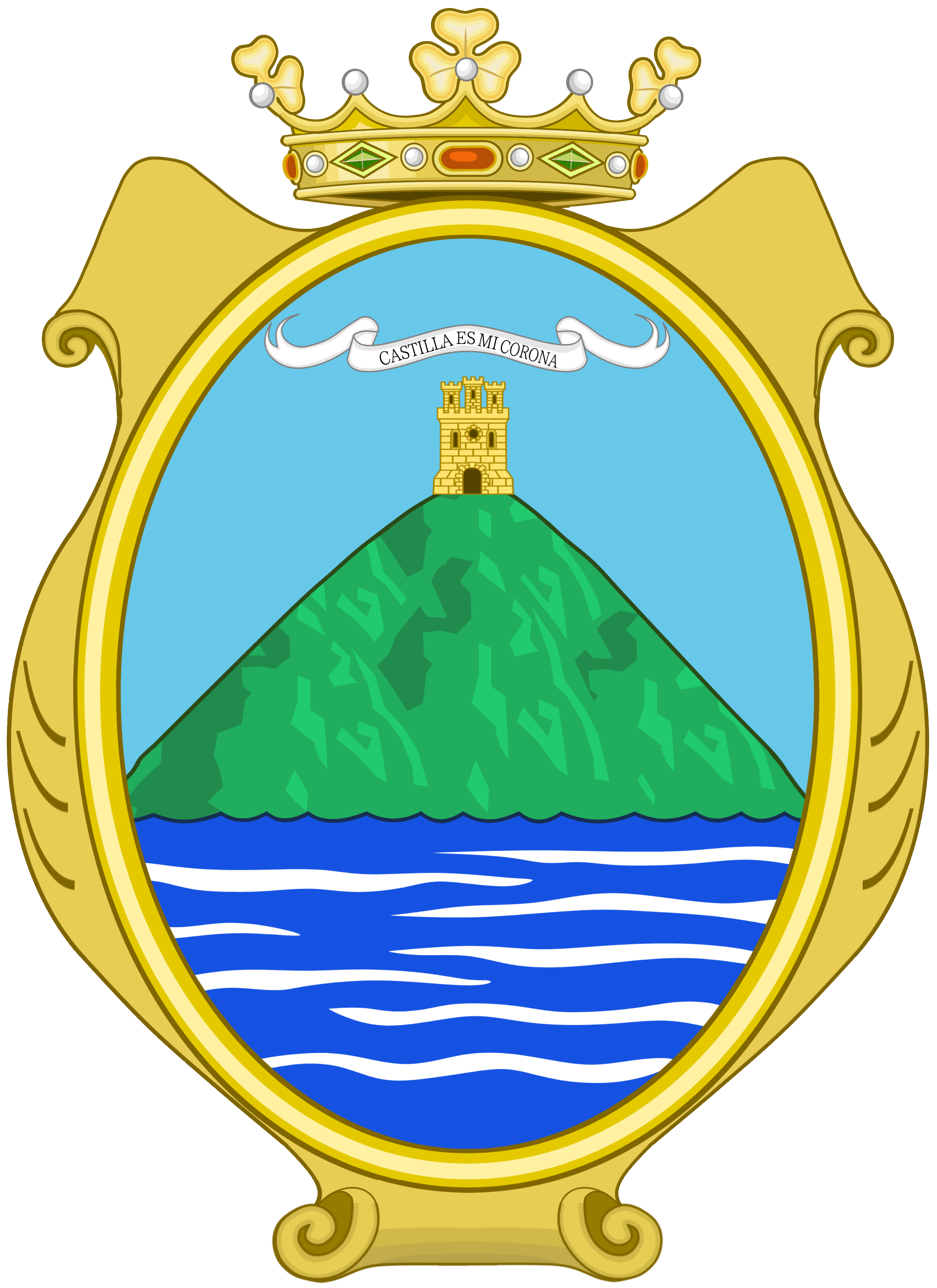
First Coat of Arms, 1807.

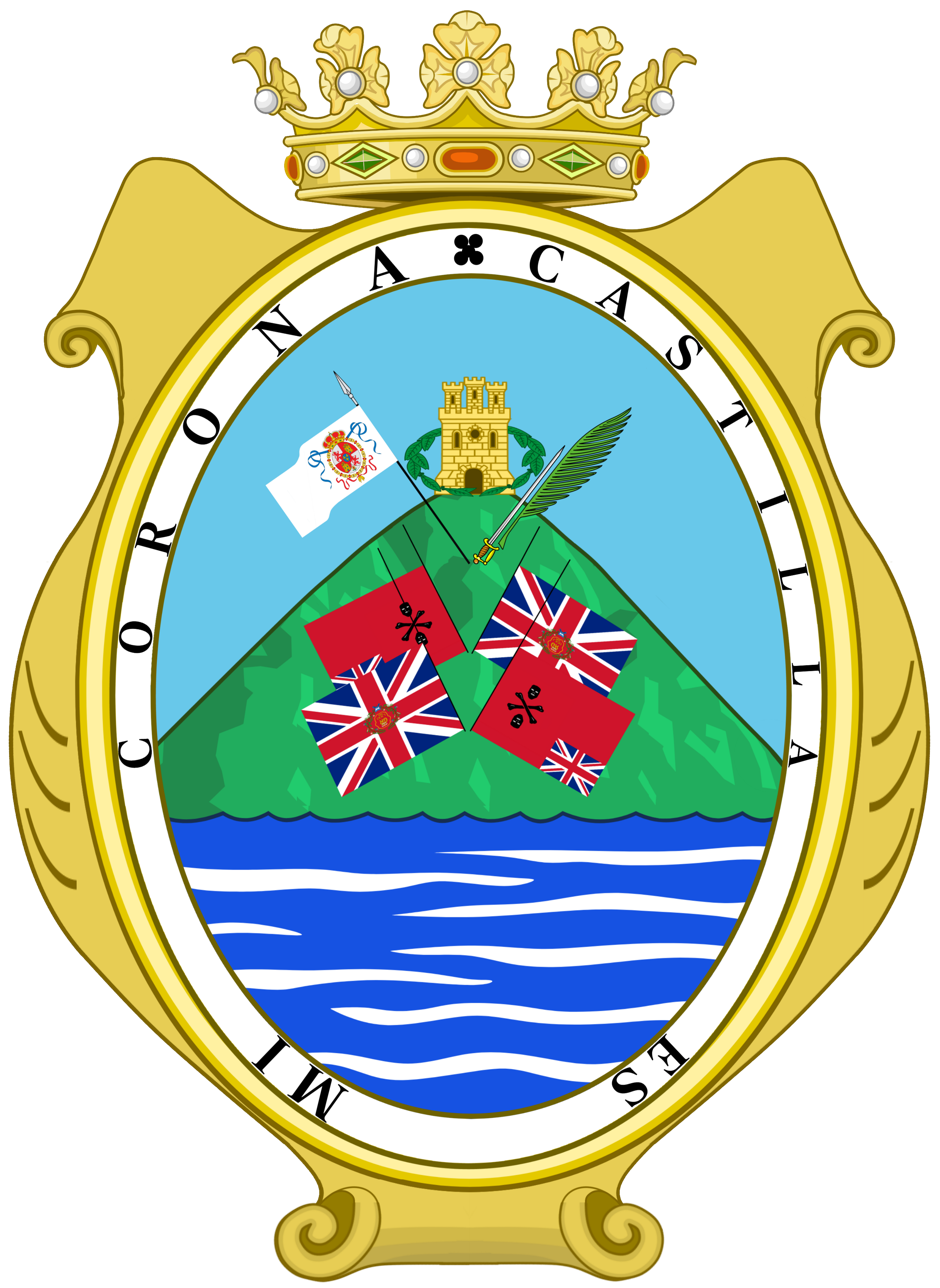
Coat of Arms after the British Invasions, 1808.

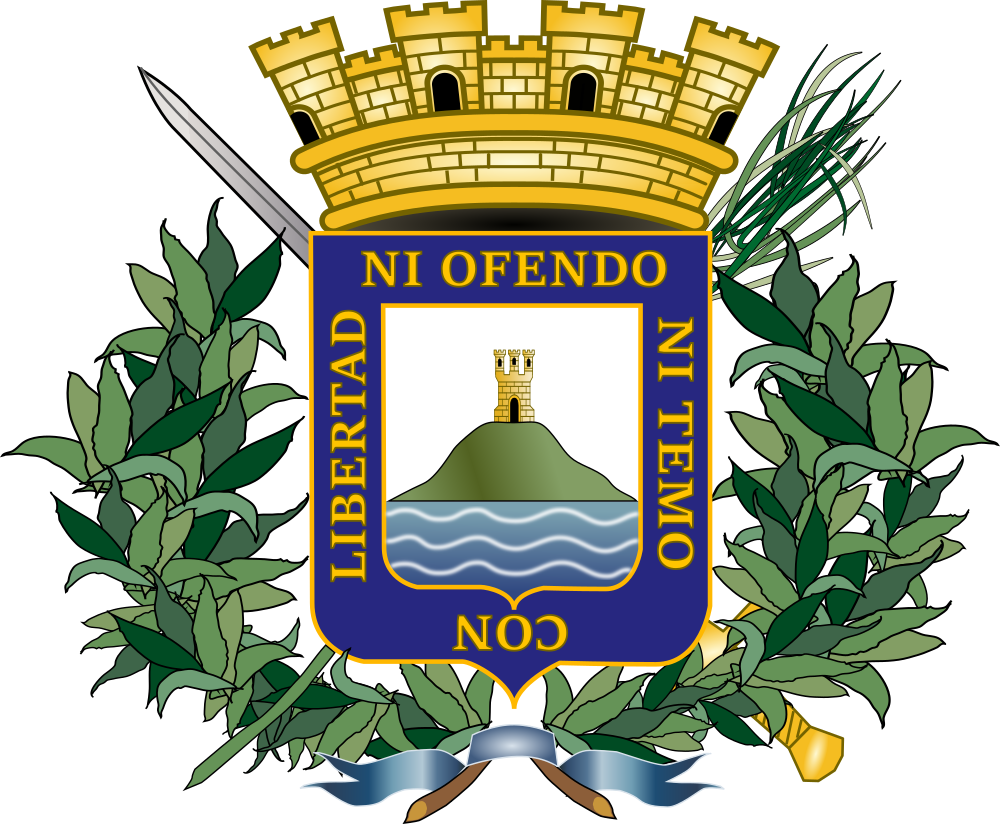
Coat of Arms as of 1895.

Coat of Arms, 1903.

There were also clerics who included this hill in their respective coats of arms:

Archbishop Juan Francisco Aragone.

Cardinal Daniel Sturla.
