= Villa del Cerro =

- Barrio
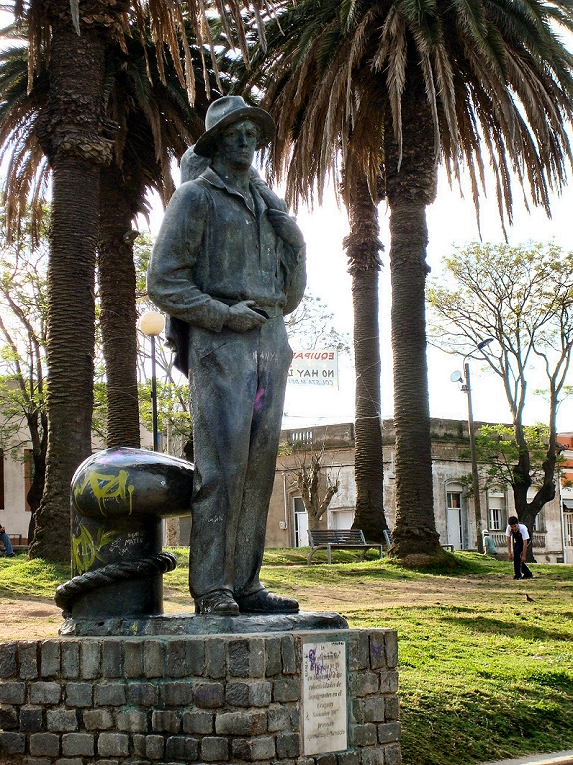
- Plaza de los Inmigrantes, Villa del Cerro

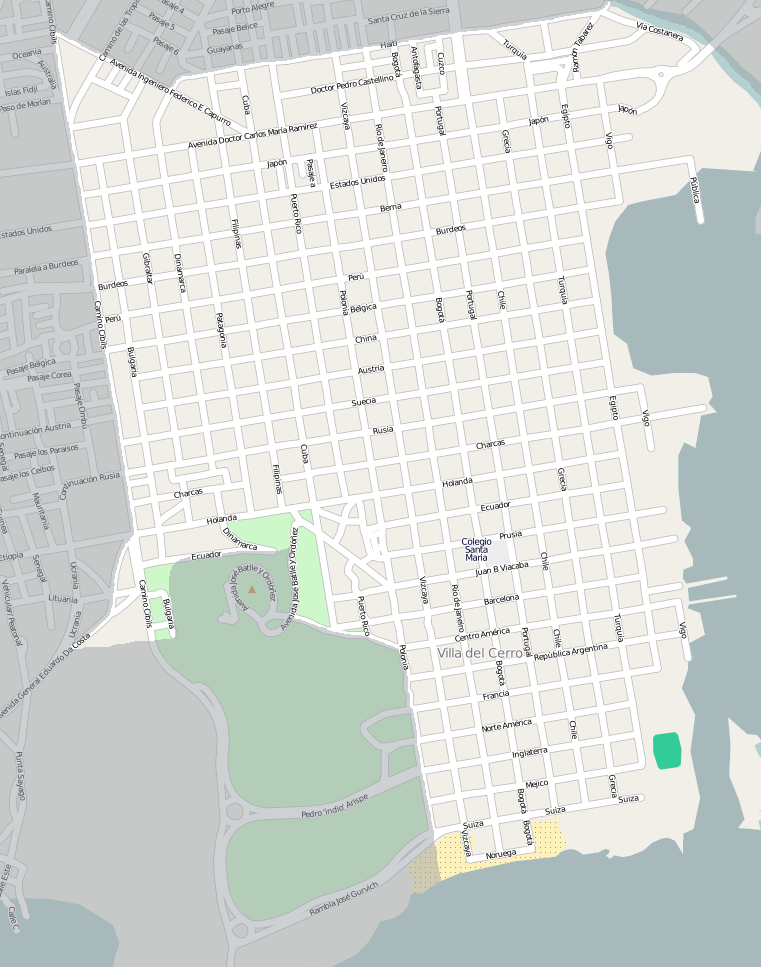
- Street map of Villa del Cerro

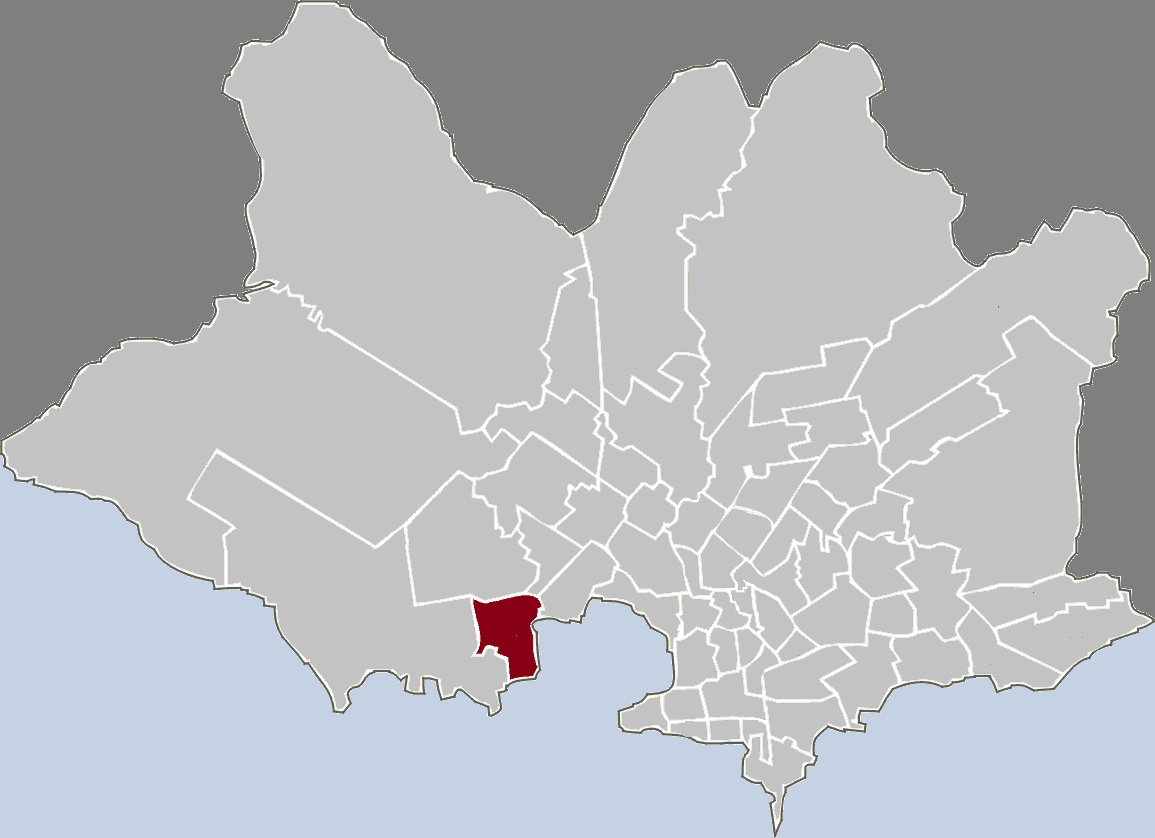
- Location of Villa del Cerro in Montevideo
- Coordinates: 34°53′4″S 56°15′5″W
- Country: Uruguay
- Department: Montevideo Department
- City: Montevideo

Villa del Cerro is a barrio (neighbourhood or district) of Montevideo, Uruguay. It is named after Montevideo Hill.

== Location ==
This barrio shares borders with Casabó to the west, La Paloma to the north, the Pantanoso Creek to the northeast, the Bay of Montevideo to the east and the coastline after the bay to the south, where the beach of the Cerro is located.

== Landmarks ==
Villa del Cerro is home to the Cementerio del Cerro, Montevideo, established in 1868.

== Places of worship ==
- Church of Our Lady of Help, popularly known as "Iglesia del Cerro", Bogotá 3585 (Catholic)
- Church of Our Lady of Fatima, Bélgica 1765 (Catholic, Jesuites)
- Parish Church of St Raphael Archangel, Av. Carlos María Ramirez 2090; also known as "Iglesia de Cerro Norte" (Catholic, Missionary Oblates of Mary Immaculate)

== See also ==
- Barrios of Montevideo
