= Pajas Blancas, Montevideo =

Pajas Blancas
- Village
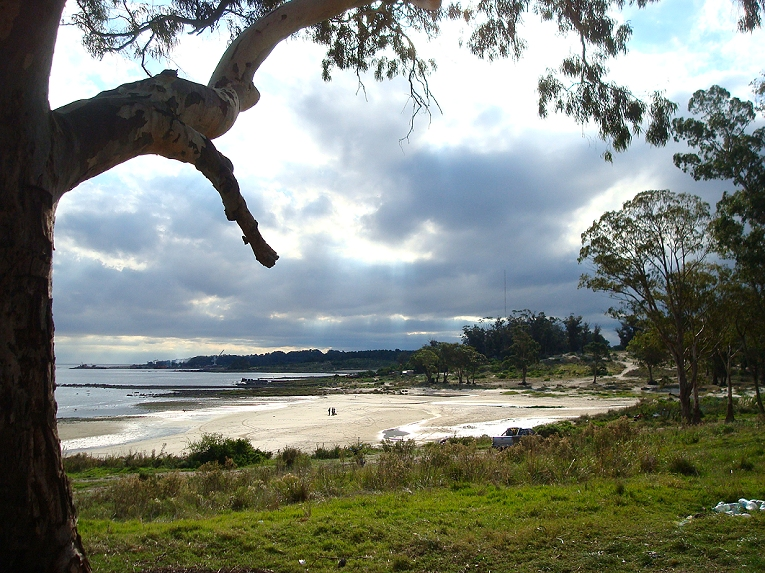
- Zabala Beach in Pajas Blancas

- Location in Uruguay
- Coordinates: 34°52′01″S 56°19′59″W
- Country: Uruguay
- Department: Montevideo Department

Population (2004)
  - Total: 1,976
- Time zone: UTC -3
- Postal code: 12800
- Dial plan: +598 2 (+7 digits)

Pajas Blancas is a village of Montevideo Department in Uruguay.

== Population ==
In 2004, Pajas Blancas had 1,976 inhabitants.

Year	Population
1963	925
1975	921
1985	1,257
1996	1,837
2004	1,976

Source: Instituto Nacional de Estadística de Uruguay
