= Parque Lecocq =

Nature reserve in Uruguay

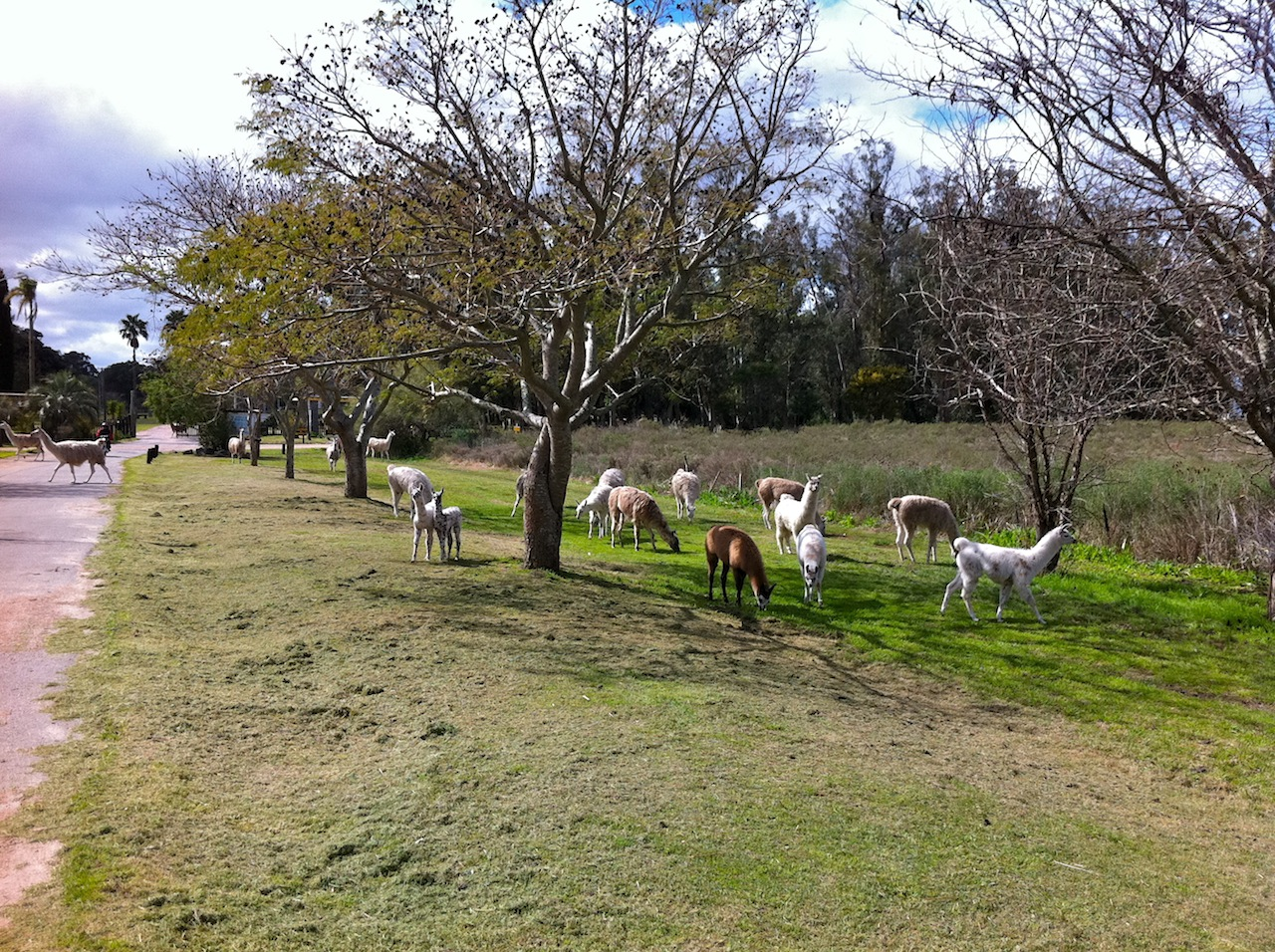
- The entrance to Parque Lecocq, with several mammals roaming freely just outside the main gate
- Interactive map of Parque Lecocq
- 34.79180°S 56.33427°W
- Location: near Santiago Vázquez, Montevideo Department, Uruguay
- Land area: 120 hectares
- No. of animals: 500
- No. of species: 33
- Website: https://montevideo.gub.uy/areas-tematicas/cultura-y-tiempo-libre/parques-plazas-y-zoologicos/zoo-parque-lecocq

Parque Lecocq is a zoo located northwest of Montevideo, Uruguay, next the town of Santiago Vázquez. It houses mammals and birds and protects flora and pursues/supports breeding programs It is adjacent to the protected wetlands of Santa Lucía National Park.

Its mandate is to be a "support centre for biodiversity conservation both nationally and internationally." The zoo houses one of the largest communities of the Addax antelope (a critically endangered species) in the world.

== History ==
The government of Montevideo's web site describes the history of Parque Lecocq as follows:

The land where the park is currently belonged to Don Francisco Lecocq (1790-1882), an outstanding man in Montevideo of his time. He was educated in England, where he forged a spirit of initiative and enterprise that applied in the importing country to its plants and animals return to their land, which still can be enjoyed in the park.

It originated in a project by architect Mario Paysée, whose goal was to create a place with animal species around the world in natural settings. It occupies an area of 120 hectares, bordering the protected area of St Lucia Wetlands.

An arsonist set several fires at the park in early December 2008, burning seven acres. The park was temporarily closed as a result, reopening March 2009. No animals were injured, but habitat was damaged.

== Resident animals ==
The park houses the following animals:

- capybara
- antelope
- mouflon
- fallow deer
- lion
- zebra
- emu
- Greater rhea
- peccary
- chital
- Pampas cat
- bobcat
- coati
- crab eating raccoon
- prehensile-tailed porcupine
- crab-eating fox
- gray fox
- monkey
- llama
