= Santiago Vázquez, Montevideo =

Santiago Vázquez
- Village
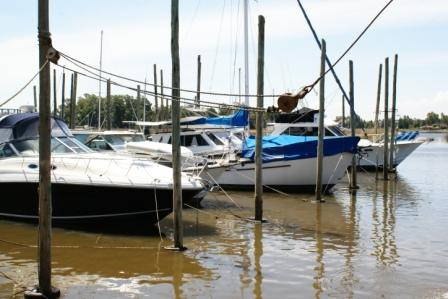
- The port of Santiago Vázquez

- Location in Uruguay
- Coordinates: 34°47′24″S 56°21′02″W
- Country: Uruguay
- Department: Montevideo Department

Population (2004)
  - Total: 1,482
- Time zone: UTC -3
- Postal code: 12600
- Dial plan: +598 2 (+7 digits)

Santiago Vázquez is a village at the western limits of Montevideo Department in Uruguay.

== Geography ==
It is located at the mouth of the river Río Santa Lucía towards the Río de la Plata, 22 kilometres (14 mi) from the centre of Montevideo.

== History ==
It was given this name by a decree of 1912, in honor of a politician and co-founder of the Constitution of 1830. It was declared a "Pueblo" by decree Ley Nº 4.049 on 1 July 1912.

== Population ==
In 2004, Santiago Vázquez had a population of 1,482 inhabitants.

Year	Population
1963	1,545
1975	1,323
1985	1,387
1996	1,670
2004	1,482

Source: Instituto Nacional de Estadística de Uruguay

== Features ==
It is surrounded by an ecologically important natural environment consisting of coasts, beaches and hills. It has a natural port which is part of the river delta and includes 25.000 hectares of wetlands. During the first half of the 20th century the village was converted into a touristic centre, marked by the construction of the "Hotel de la Barra", the boat races, the yacht club and the parks "Parque Segunda República Española" and Parque Lecocq.

Santiago Vázquez is also known as "La Barra", from the rotary iron bridge of British construction which along with the modern bridge of Ruta 1, join Montevideo with the San José Department.

== Places of worship ==
- Parish Church of Our Lady of the Guard and St. Aloysius Gonzaga, Silvestre Ochoa 434 (Roman Catholic)

== See also ==
- Paso de la Arena
