= Nuevo París =

- Barrio
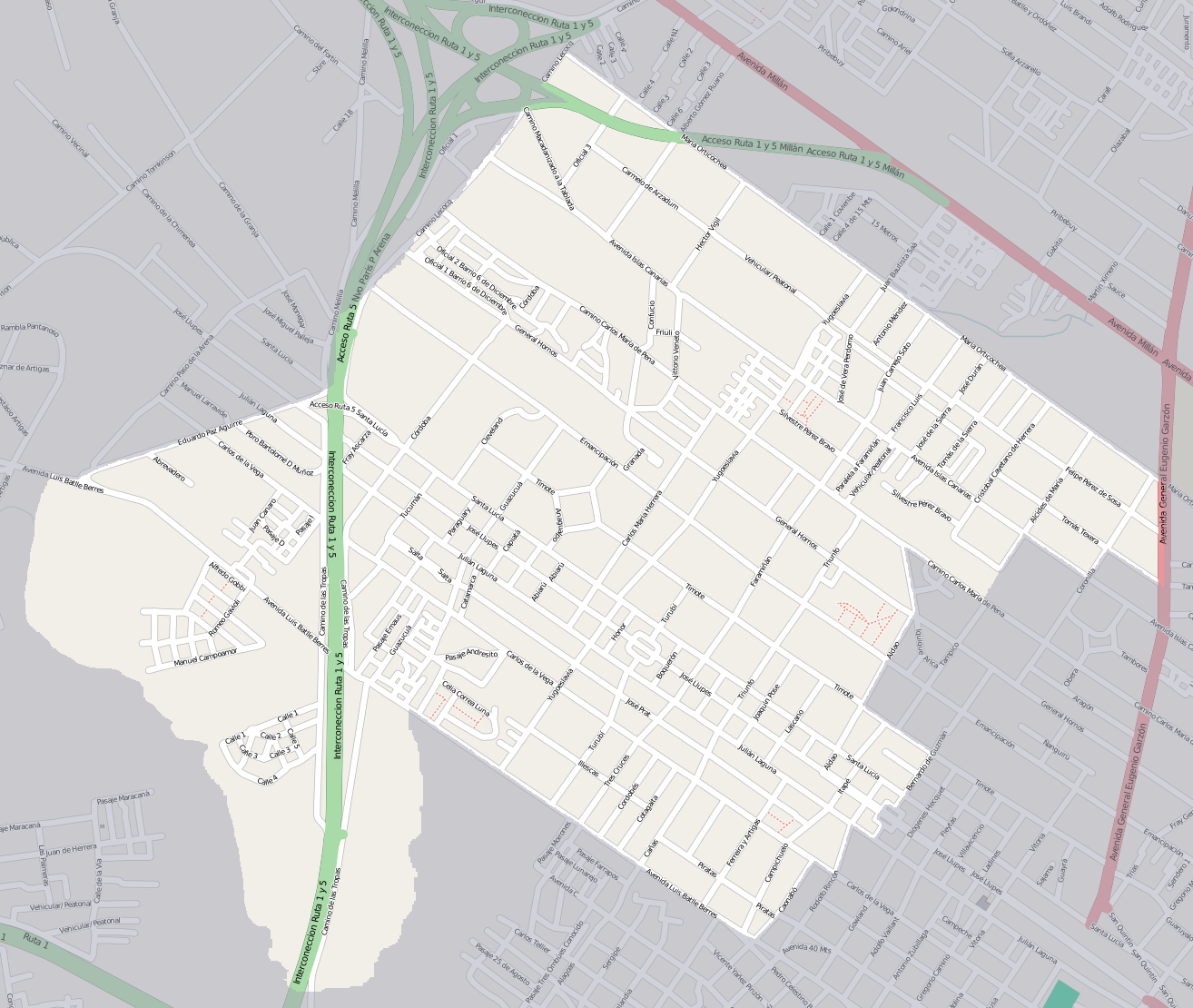
- Street map of Nuevo París

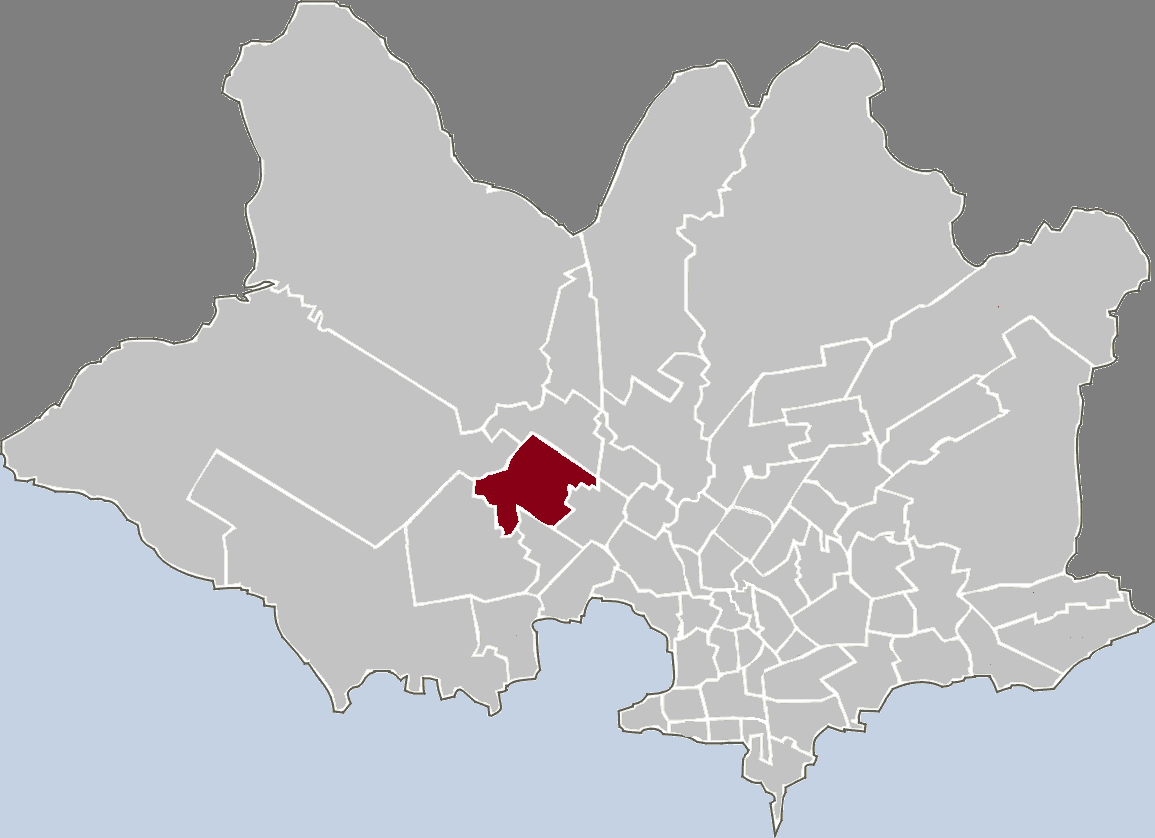
- Location of Nuevo París in Montevideo
- Coordinates: 34°50′0″S 56°15′0″W
- Country: Uruguay
- Department: Montevideo Department
- City: Montevideo

Nuevo París is a barrio (neighbourhood) of Montevideo, Uruguay.

== See also ==
- Barrios of Montevideo
