= Bay of Montevideo =

Bay around Montevideo, Uruguay

Coordinates: 34°53′59″S 56°14′3″W

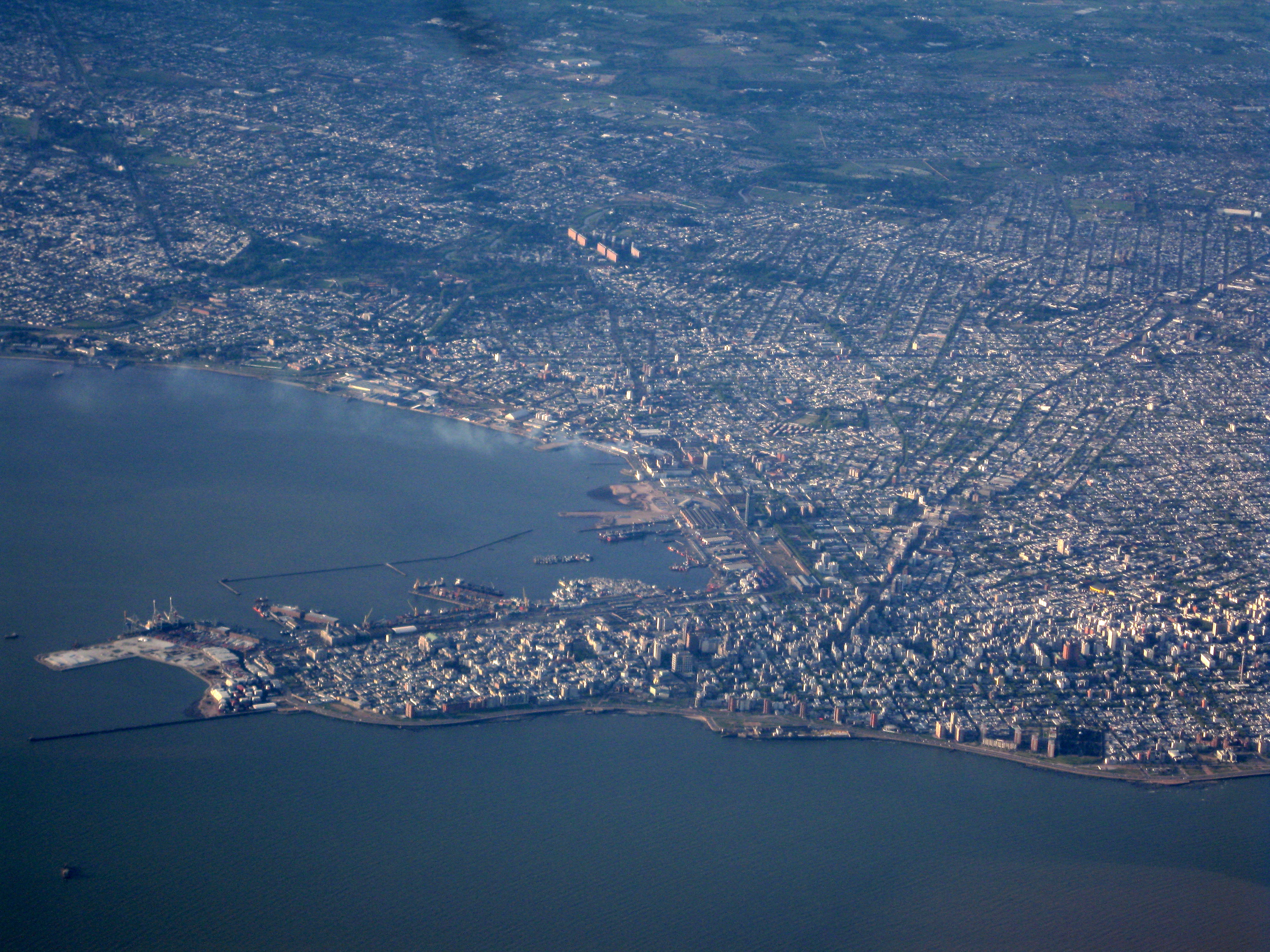
Aerial

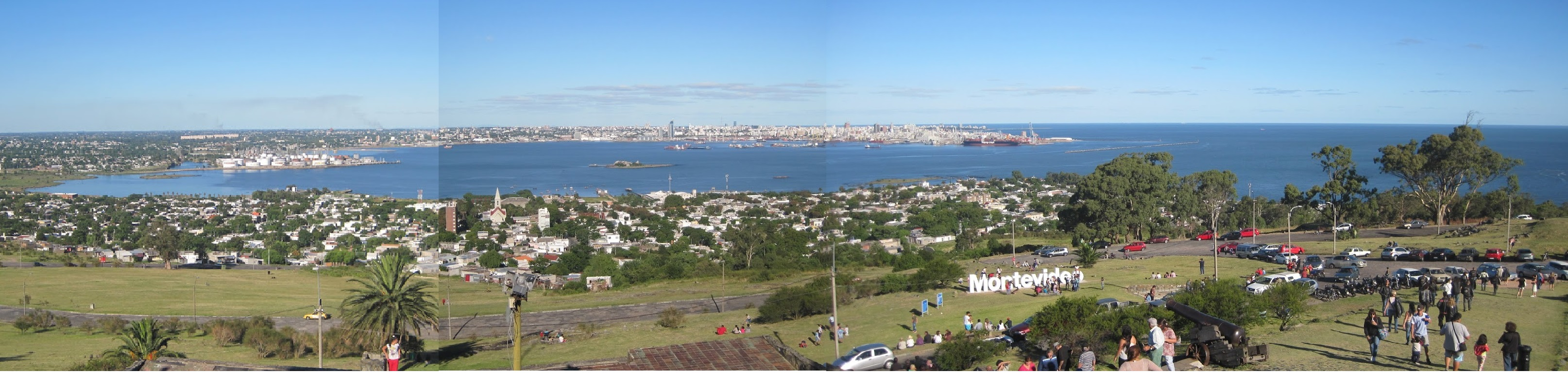
Looking across the bay

The Bay of Montevideo (Spanish: Bahía de Montevideo) is the bay around the city of Montevideo, Uruguay in the Río de la Plata. It was previously named by Pedro de Mendoza as "Bahía de la Candelaria".

== Description ==
The bay has a round shape – approximately 4 kilometres (2 1/2 mi) in diameter at low tide – and a very secure port suited for boats with a deep draft. On its west side, is the Cerro de Montevideo crowned by the fortress of the same name with a lighthouse which dominates the landscape.

== Port ==
The Port of Montevideo annually receives many passengers and cargo. It is one of the major ports of South America and plays a very important role in the economy of Uruguay. The port's proximity has contributed to the installation of various industries in the area surrounding the bay, particularly import/export businesses, and business related to port activity and naval activity. Because of the density of industrial development in the area surrounding the port, the residential popularity is relatively low. The main environmental problems are subaquatic sedimentation and air and water contamination.

The port has been growing rapidly and consistently at an average annual rate of 14 percent due to an increase in foreign trade. The city has received a US$20 million loan from the Inter-American Development Bank to modernize the port, increase its size and efficiency, and enable lower maritime and river transportation costs.
