= Casabó =

- Barrio
- Interactive map of Casabó
- Coordinates: 34°52′0″S 56°18′30″W
- Country: Uruguay
- Department: Montevideo Department
- City: Montevideo
- Time zone: UTC -3
- Postal code: 12800 & 12700
- Dial plan: +598 2 (+7 digits)

Casabó is a neighbourhood of Montevideo, Uruguay.

== Geography ==
The neighbourhood of Casabó is located in the southwestern part of Montevideo, between the districts of Santa Catalina to the west, Villa del Cerro to the east, Villa Esperanza to the north and the Río de la Plata to the south.
Casabó is the western extension of the Villa del Cerro and it includes the Fortaleza del Cerro, the Parque Dr. Carlos Vaz Ferreira and the ruins of the cold storage factory Frigorífico Swift, the shut-down Frigorífico Nacional, the Club de Golf del Cerro and an area of the Navy. To the west of Casabó is the neighbourhood of Santa Catalina, situated next to the beach and the public park of Punta Yeguas.

== See also ==
- Barrios of Montevideo
