= Fortaleza del Cerro =

Fortaleza del Cerro Lighthouse
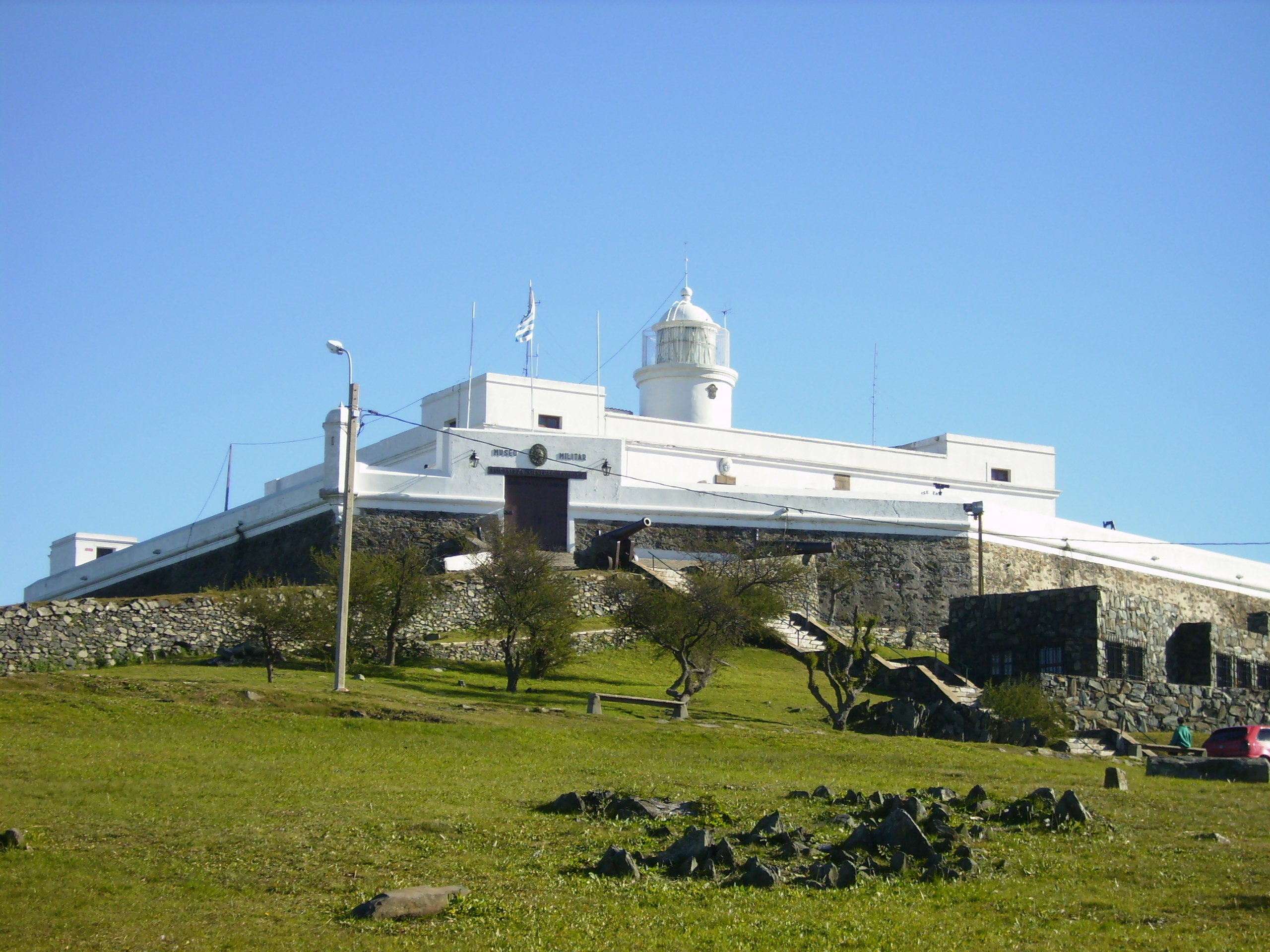
- The fortress on the Cerro de Montevideo
- Location: Villa del Cerro, Montevideo, Uruguay
- Coordinates: 34°53′19″S 56°15′36″W

Tower
- Constructed: 1802
- Construction: brick
- Height: 8 m (26 ft)
- Shape: cylindrical tower with balcony and lantern atop a fortress
- Markings: White

Light
- Focal height: 148 m (486 ft)
- Range: 19 nmi (35 km; 22 mi)
- Characteristic: Fl(3) W 10s
- Uruguay no.: UY-424

The Fortaleza del Cerro, also known as Fortaleza General Artigas, is a fortress situated in Montevideo, Uruguay overlooking the Bay of Montevideo. It belongs to the barrio of Casabó, at the west of Villa del Cerro. It holds a dominant position on the highest hill of the department of Montevideo (popularly known as Cerro de Montevideo) with an altitude of 134 meters above sea level, on the opposite side of the bay. Its function was to defend the population of Montevideo and its port, on the río de la Plata. Governor Francisco Javier de Elío ordered construction in 1809 and it was completed in 1839; this was the last Spanish fort built in Uruguay. It has housed the Military Museum since 1916.

== Monument and Sight ==
It has been a National Monument since 1931 and has housed a military museum since 1916. Today it is a well-known attraction for tourists visiting Montevideo.

== See also ==
- List of lighthouses in Uruguay
