= Montevideo Department =

Department of Uruguay

Montevideo
- Department
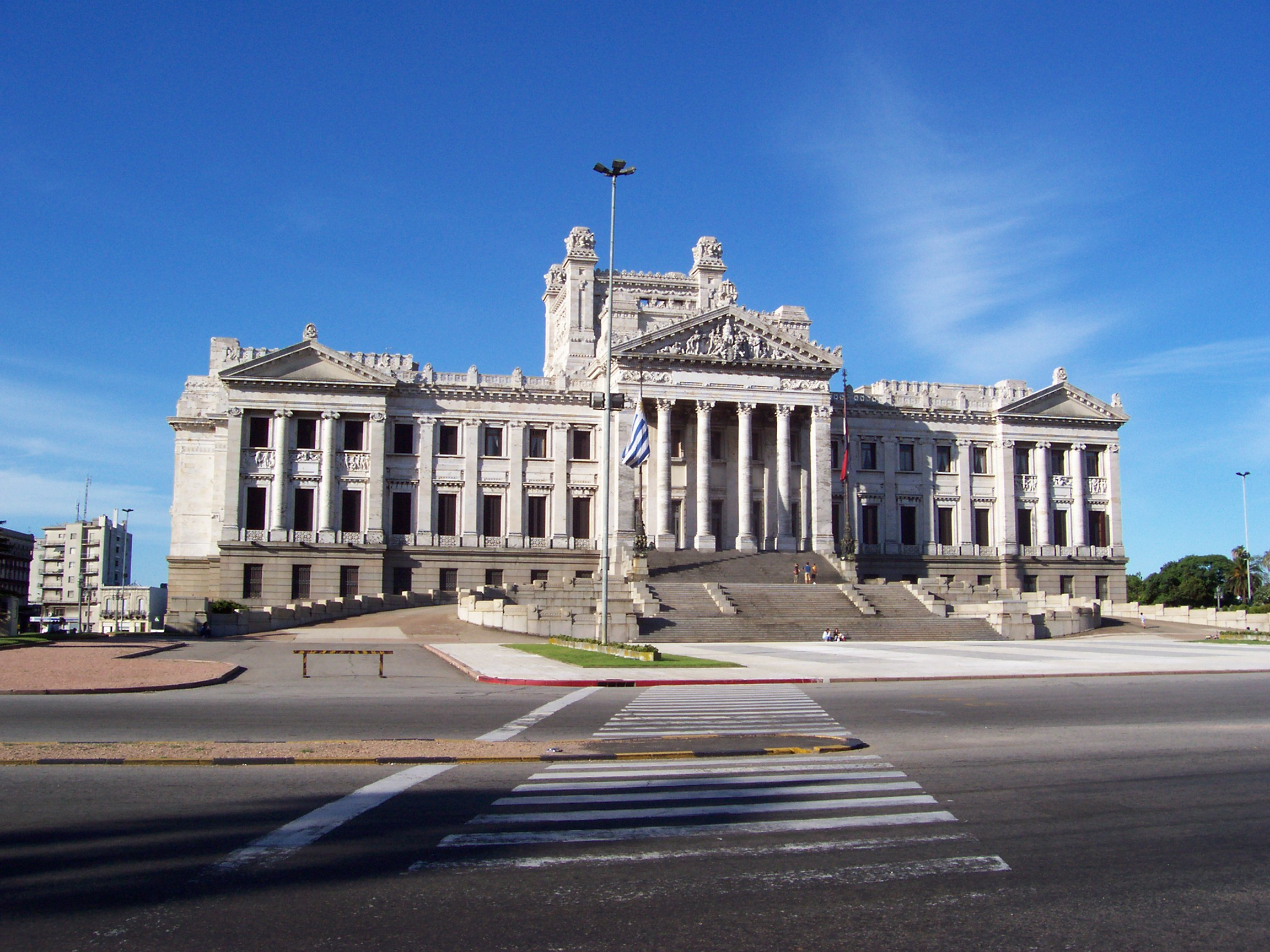
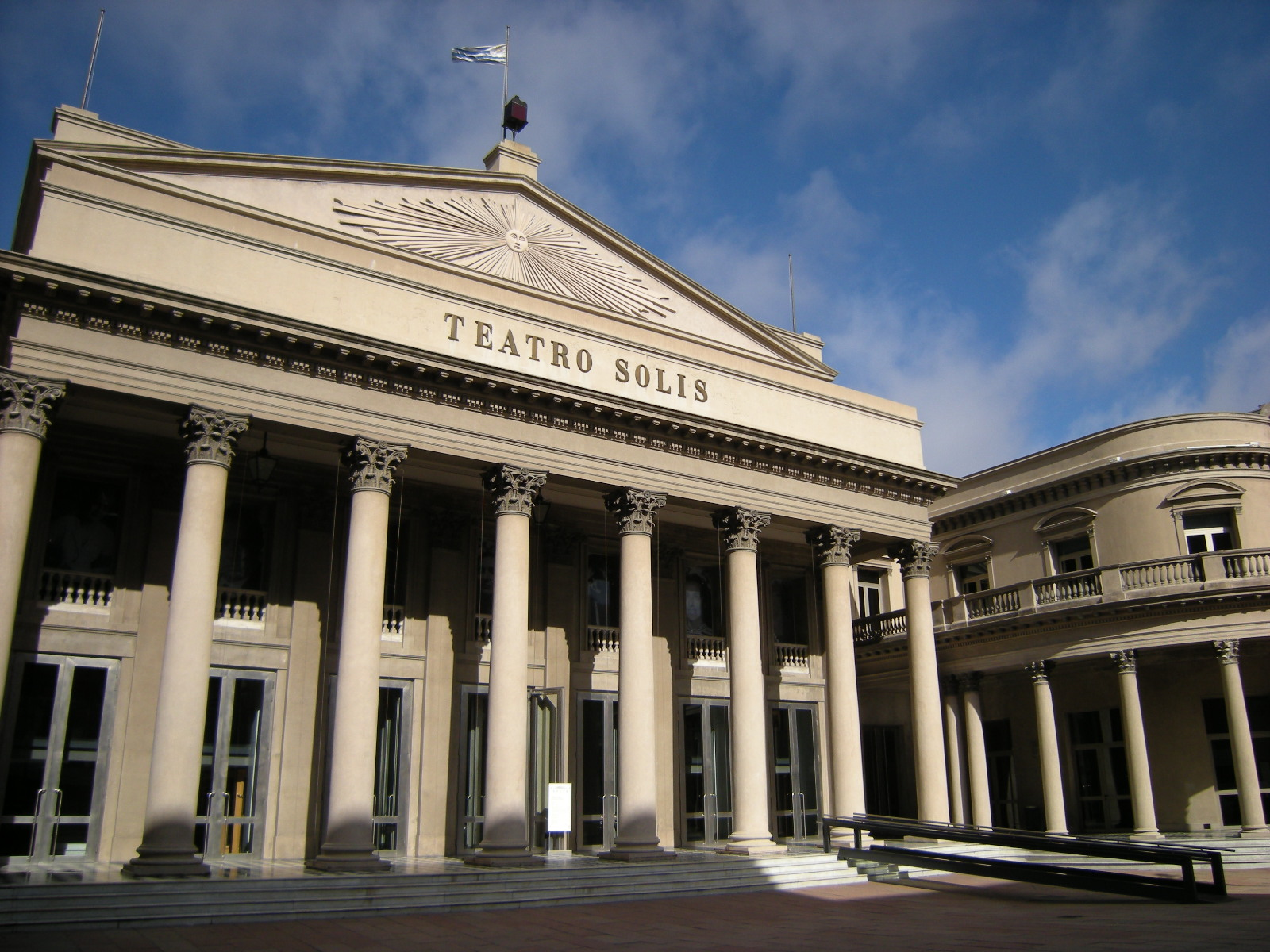
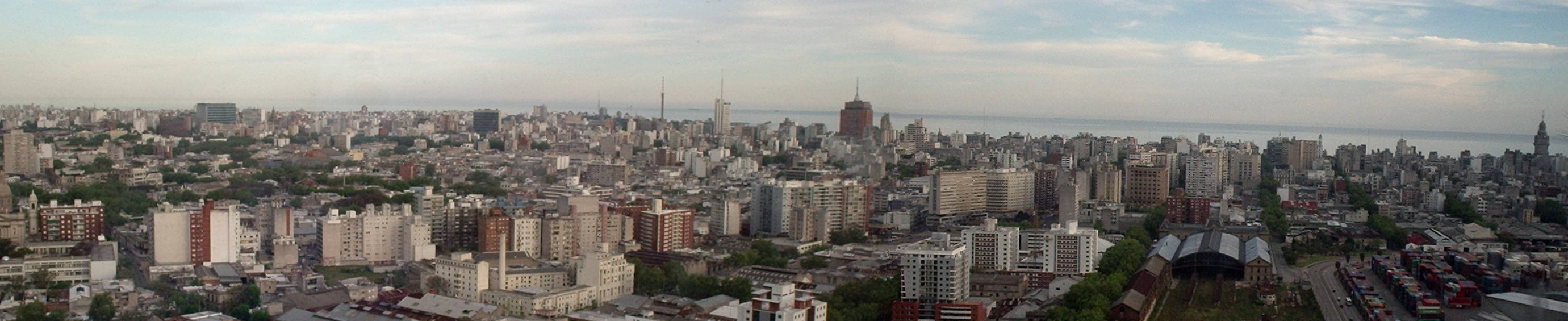
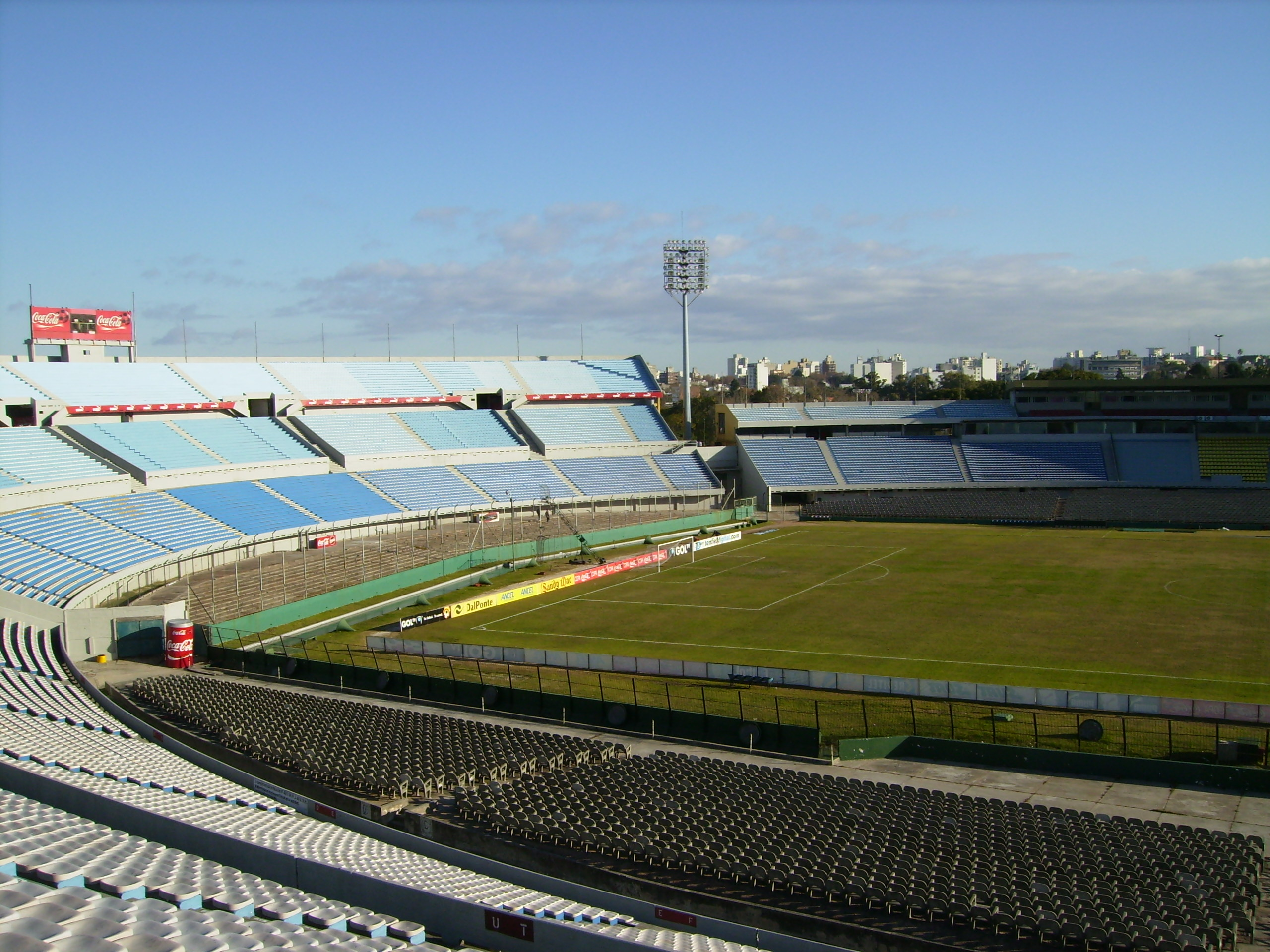
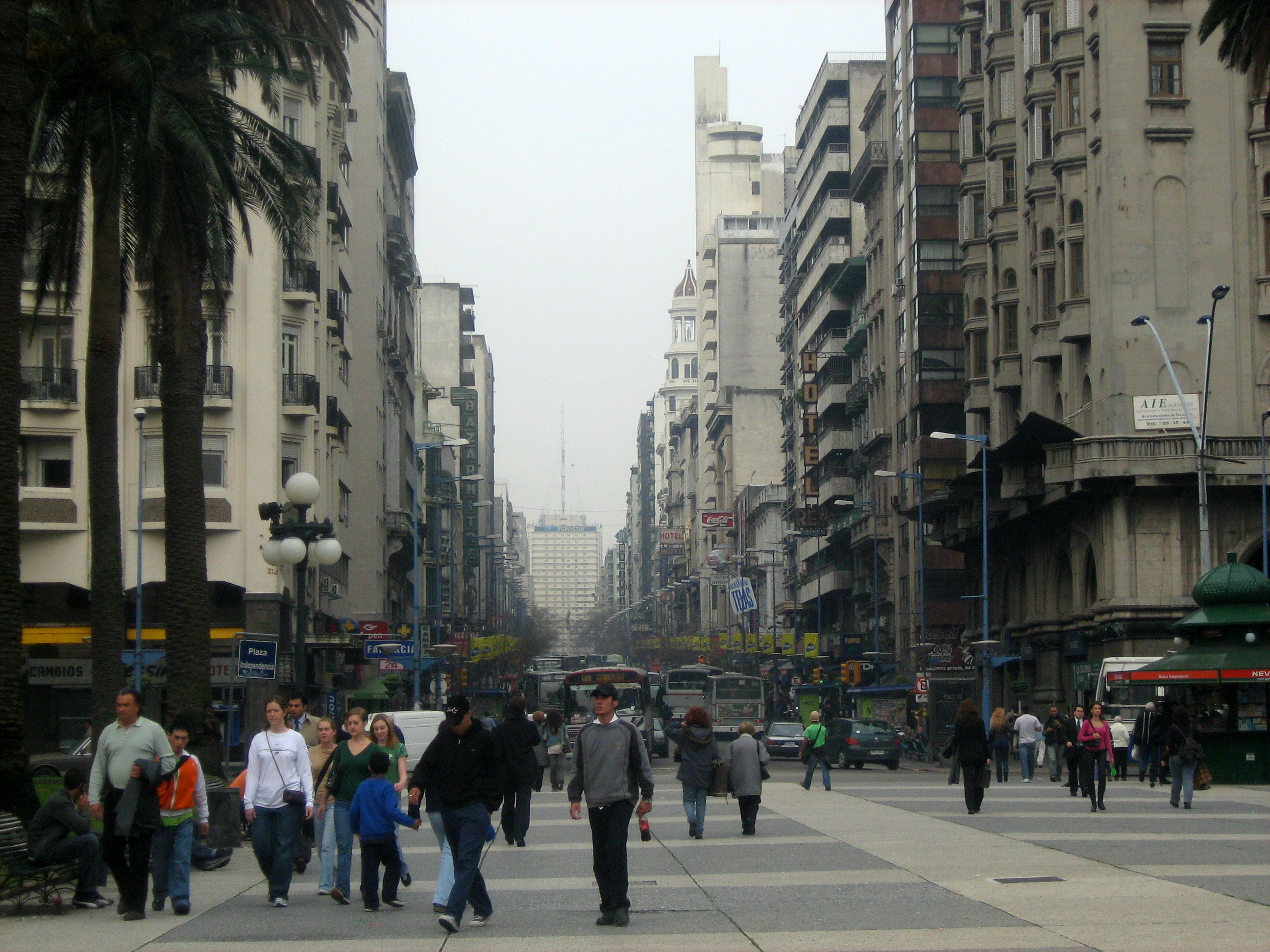
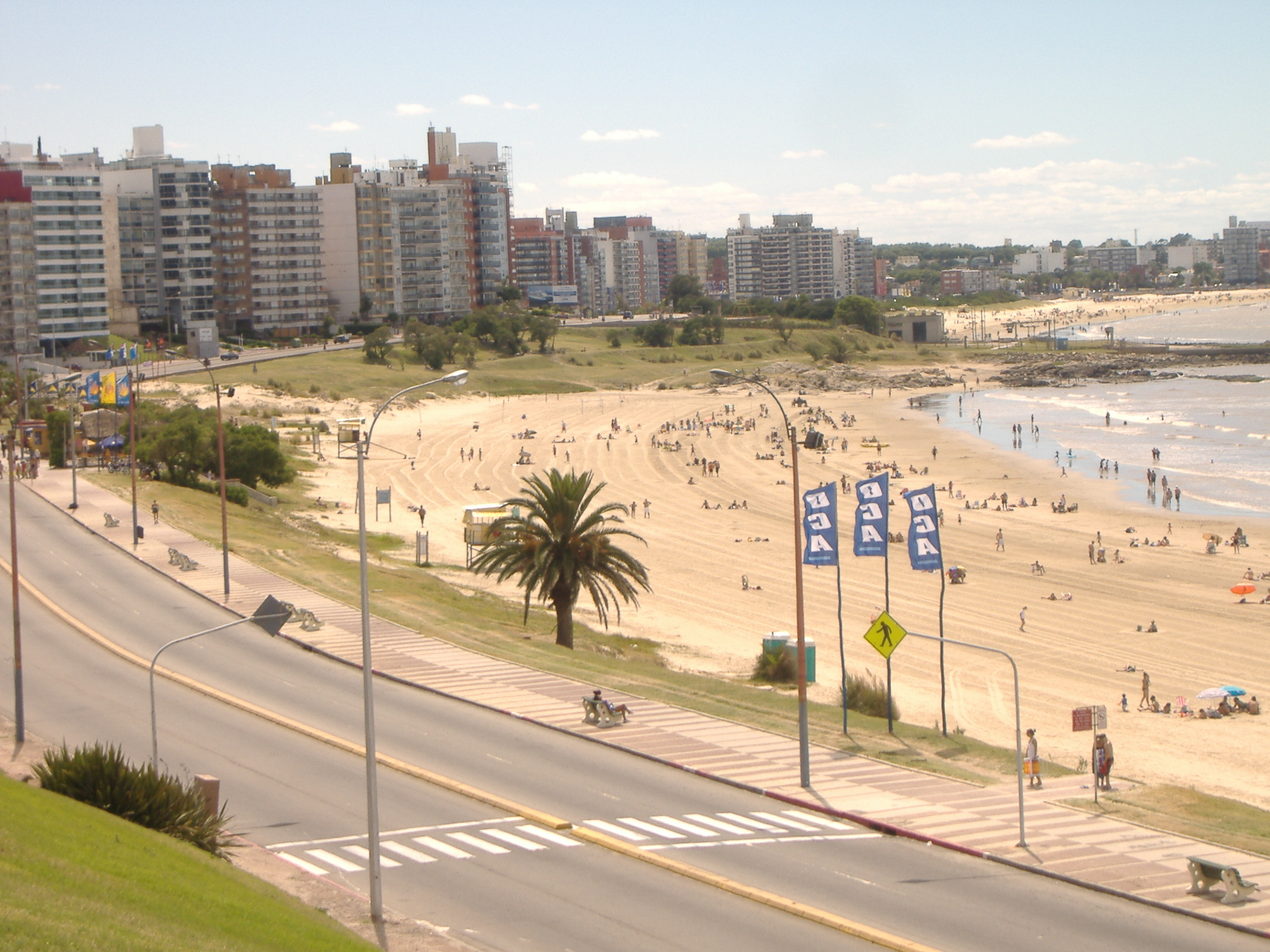
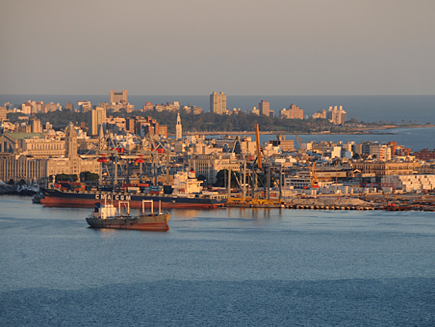

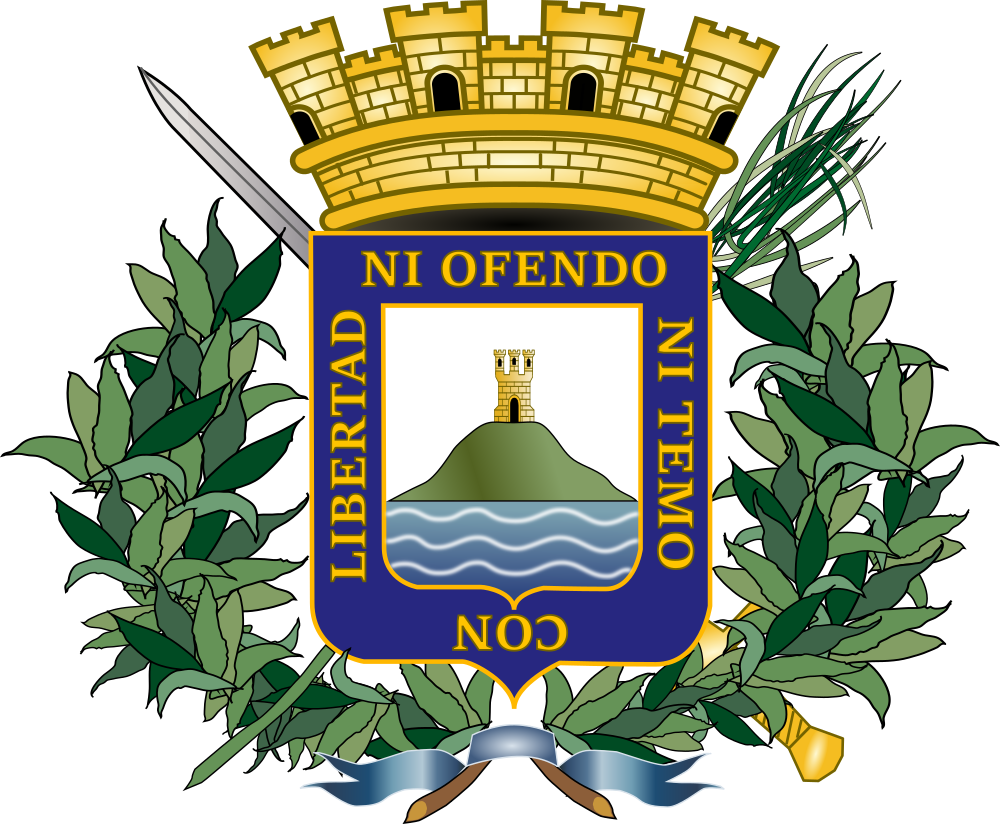
- Coat of arms

- Location of Montevideo Department in Uruguay
- Coordinates (Montevideo (km.0)): 34°54′21.4″S 56°11′29.6″W
- Country: Uruguay
- Established: 1816
- Capital of Department: Montevideo (km.0)

Government
  - Intendant: Mario Bergara
  - Ruling party: Broad Front

Area
  - Total: 530 km^{2} (200 sq mi)
- Elevation: 43 m (141 ft)

Population (2023 census)
  - Total: 1,302,954
  - Density: 2,500/km^{2} (6,400/sq mi)
- Demonym: Montevideano
- Time zone: UTC-3 (UYT)
- Postal code: 11000-13000
- ISO 3166 code: UY-MO
- Vehicle registration: S
- Website: montevideo.gub.uy

Montevideo (Spanish pronunciation: [monteβiˈðeo]) is a department (departamento) of Uruguay. It is by far the smallest department in area, but also by far the most populated. Its capital is the city of Montevideo, which is also the national capital. While most of the department is covered by the capital city, there are still smaller towns within its limits.

The rambla of Montevideo, the 22 km. in 14 minutes.

== History ==
Montevideo Department was one of the first departments created in the current territory of Uruguay, then Provincia Oriental. It was created on 27 January 1816 by Montevideo Cabildo's decree and approved by José Artigas on next 3 February, at the same time Maldonado, Soriano, Canelones, San José and Colonia departments were being created. This decree mentioned about its territory that it comprised "beyond the Capital's wall until the Peñarol line". This administrative subdivision Montevideo Department was part of, stayed with some differences performed during the Portuguese and Brazilian domain of the province as Cisplatina Province.

After the Oriental Province obtained its independence as Uruguay, the first Constitution drafted by the Constitutional Assembly was sworn, and its first article confirmed the existing nine departments, among them Montevideo. Years later, the General Assembly passed the Law no. 84 of 7 April 1835, with the power granted by article 17 part 9 of the Constitution (currently article 85), by which reinstated "to Montevideo Department the borders it was assigned during the original creation of departments". This law was further regulated by the decree of 28 August 1835, where it precisely defined where were the borders of Montevideo: the Santa Lucía river from its estuary in River Plate to the convergence with Las Piedras stream, and following this stream until its source at the Pereira hills. There, the border continues through the turn of the hills until the source of Toledo stream, and from there goes through the Toledo stream until the confluence with the Carrasco shoal (in the middle of Carrasco wetlands) and from there going through Carrasco stream until its mouth to the River Plate.

== Government ==
The Intendencia Departamental de Montevideo is charged with the executive functions of the Department, while the legislative functions are exercised by the Junta Departamental de Montevideo.

== Demographics ==
According to the 2011 census, Montevideo Department has a population of 1,319,108 (613,990 male and 705,014 female) and 520,538 households. There are also 186,835 business premises.

- Population growth rate: -2.566% (2011 preliminary)
- Birth Rate: 14.40 births/1,000 people (2004)
- Death Rate: 10.35 deaths/1,000 people (2004)
- Average age: 33.8 (31.2 Males, 36.5 Females) (2004)
- Life Expectancy at Birth (2004):
  - Total population: 75.28 years
  - Male: 71.28 years
  - Female: 79.44 years
- Average Family Size: 1.91 children/woman (2004)
- Urban per capita income (cities of 5,000 inhabitants or more): 19,858.7 pesos/month (2004)

=== Main Urban Centers ===
During the 2004 census the following urban centers had been counted:

City / Town	Population
Montevideo	1,680,552
Pajas Blancas	1,976
Santiago Vázquez	1,482
Abayubá	924

The census of 2011 has counted a population of 1,684,554 for the whole of Montevideo. Separate numbers have been provided for each of the 8 new divisions of the department called Municipios (Municipalities).

=== Rural population ===
According to the 2011 census, Montevideo Department has a rural population of 14,026.
