= Women in the internal conflict in Peru =

Women in the Internal conflict in Peru were active in a large variety of roles, both making significant impacts on the Conflict and with the Conflict having significant impacts on them. Post-conflict women, especially Indigenous women, have played major roles in reconciliation efforts.

According to Camille Boutron of the Universidad de los Andes: "Women's motivations for joining the armed struggle were diverse, as were their social origins, ages, and occupations. On the other side of the conflict, women contributed to the self-defense committees that were formed in the early 1980s to support the Peruvian army in the struggle. Despite being mentioned by the Truth and Reconciliation Commission in its 2003 final report, the contribution of peasant women to the war still remains neglected in histories of the conflict."

== Women in the Shining Path ==
The Marxist–Leninist–Maoist and Gonzalo Thought guerrillas known as the Communist Party of Peru – Shining Path (Spanish: Partido Comunista del Perú – Sendero Luminoso had a high proportion of women; 50% of the combatants and 40% of the commanders were women. Augusta La Torre, also known as Comrade Norah, was the number two in command of Shining Path and her influence on her husband, Shining Path founder Abimael Guzmán, has been credited with helping establish the high levels of participation of women. After her death in 1988, Elena Yparraguirre took over her position as second-in-command and later married Guzmán. Catalina Adrianzen was one of the leaders and founders of the Movimiento Femenino Popular front group before being arrested and later leaving Peru to move to Sweden. Maritza Garrido Lecca, a ballet dancer, sheltered Guzman in her apartment in the early 1990s, being arrested along with him in 1992.

In 1974, a documented titled Marxism, Mariategui and the Women's Movement was published by the leaders of the Movimiento Femenino Popular as a framework for the role of women within Shining Path. The document proclaimed that "the struggle of Peruvian women and of proletarian women has a long tradition, sealed with their blood" and that "the woman question is an important question for the popular struggle and its importance is greater today because actions are intensifying which tend to mobilize women."

However, despite the relatively high participation of women, the Shining Path often saw feminist struggles as secondary in importance to class struggle and was marked by a high degree of adulation towards communist men and the development of a patriarchal cult of personality around Guzmán. By the mid-1980s, references to women's liberation had mostly vanished from Shining Path publications.

== Women in other militant groups ==
Men and women both contributed to the Ronda Campesina autonomous peasant patrols opposing Shining Path in rural Peru, with men patrolling and protecting the community while women cooked and cleaned in support of the men's obligations.

In 2012, police officer Nancy Flores Paucar was killed by Shining Path as she piloted a helicopter transporting anti-terrorist troops to assault a Shining Path cell holding several dozen workers hostage in Kepashiato, the only fatal police casualty of the operation.

== Women civilians ==
During the internal conflict in Peru beginning in the 1980s, some families became matriarchal, with approximately 78 percent of migrant families being headed by women. In shantytowns, women established soup kitchens (comedores) and worked together to ensure that their families received enough food to eat. If you also think about in the 18th century, women were also a ban of their household. Their husbands were no longer seen as their protecters once they fled, so women had to step up.

María Elena Moyano, an Afro-Peruvian community organizer and feminist who was twice president of FEPOMUVES (the Popular Federation of Women of Villa El Salvador), was assassinated by the Shining Path in 1992 after criticising the group. An estimated 300,000 people attended the funeral of María Elena Moyano, with the outrage over her murder causing a major drop in support for Shining Path.

== Women of other nationalities ==
Irene McCormack was an Australian missionary with the Sisters of St Joseph of the Sacred Heart who was murdered in 1991 by Shining Path. In 2010, it was reported that Australian Catholic clergy were considering petitioning the Vatican to have McCormack recognised as a saint.

American civil rights activist Yuri Kochiyama joined a delegation to Peru, organized by the American Maoist Revolutionary Communist Party, to gather support for Abimael Guzmán, the imprisoned leader of the Shining Path.

Lori Berenson, an American who had previously worked as a translator for the Farabundo Martí National Liberation Front in El Salvador, was sentenced to 20 years in prison in 1996 for collaborating with the Túpac Amaru Revolutionary Movement. Her arrest and trial has been described by The Guardian as a "cause celebre for human rights campaigners and a symbol for leftwing social activists around the world" and attracted criticism from the US State Department to Amnesty International.

== Violence against women ==
It has been reported that in Peru, throughout the internal conflict, women were frequent victims of sustained war rape perpetrated by government security forces and the Shining Path. Most women affected by violence during the war were Indigenous and campesinas. According to Human Rights Watch:

women have been the targets of sustained, frequently brutal violence committed by both parties to the armed conflict often for the purpose of punishing or dominating those believed to be sympathetic to the opposing side. Women have been threatened, raped and murdered by both government security forces and by members of the Communist Party of Peru, the Shining Path. Often, the same woman is the victim of violence by both sides.

A 2009 study found that "52 percent of [rape] cases occurred in state-run detention facilities" and that it was "targeted and perpetrated with deliberation. The state did not engage in the wholesale rape of villages, but rather sought specific individuals. About 71 percent of cases involved a single victim. Victims were most often identified and targeted for their opposition to the state, including their membership (or suspected membership) in the Shining Path."

In 2006, the Peruvian government passed a law excluding all victims of sexual violence during the conflict except for those raped, such as people who had been forced to have abortions or had had their genitals tortured, from receiving compensation. In 2012, the exclusion was reversed. In 2019, a judge found that fourteen retired non-commissioned officers were guilty of crimes against humanity due to their systemic rape of peasant farmers during the conflict.

The abuses during the conflict have caused both mental and physical problems in women. Identification papers, necessary for the execution of civil rights like voting, were also destroyed en masse. As of 2007, approximately 18.1 percent of Peruvian women are living without the necessary documents, as opposed to 12.2 percent of men. Even today, women from indigenous tribes may be treated disrespectfully by authority figures. The same applies to poor women.

== Life after involvement in the conflict ==
Two of the twelve commissioners of the Truth and Reconciliation Commission were women: Sofía Macher Batanero, former Executive Secretary of the Human Rights National Coordinator, and Beatriz Alva Hart, former member of the Congress of Peru. Its mandate did not include a specific obligation to a gender perspective or a special analysis of gender-based crimes, but it became concerned with incorporating a gender perspective in its work. A gender perspective widens the scope of victimization and introduces new crimes that are subject to investigation. The commission held a public forum to establish the importance of the role of women in the internal conflict, as well as provided training workshops for TRC teams and volunteers. Overall, 54% of testimonies were given by women; within the Ayacucho region, women gave 64% of the testimonies. It investigated how the violence affected men and women differently, the participation of women in the Shining Path and the Túpac Amaru Revolutionary Movement, and it considered a broad spectrum of sexual abuse and violence. The TRC's final report included a chapter on sexual violence and gender analysis, as well as proposing several recommendations. However, some argue that the TRC's mandate was too focused and did not adequately address certain communities' experiences, such as the approximately 200 000 impoverished Indigenous women who were sterilized without consent by the Fujimori government, and the final report was insufficient in acknowledging the impact on their communities.

The National Association of Relatives of the Kidnapped, Detained and Disappeared of Peru is primarily made of women in Ayacucho, led by Adelina Garcia.

A 2013 study from McGill University found that exposure to the conflict had long-lasting effects on indicators of long-term health in women. A 2019 study on the aftermath of the conflict estimated that in departments which had experienced conflict-related sexual violence, women in the department were at increased risk of intimate partner violence after the war.

== In popular culture ==
In 2009, the film The Milk of Sorrow was released, written and directed by Claudia Llosa. Focusing on the use of rape as a weapon during the conflict, the film became the first Peruvian film to be nominated for Best Foreign Language Film at the Academy Awards.

In 2016, Claudia Salazar Jiménez published her debut novel Blood of the Dawn, following the fictional stories of three women during the Conflict, a photographer chronicling atrocities, a peasant farmer, and a teacher who joins Shining Path.

== See also ==
- Women in Peru
- Violence against women in Peru
