= DIRCOTE Museum =

Museum in Lima, Peru

- Museo de la DIRCOTE
- Location: 400 Spain Ave.
- Owner: National Police of Peru

DIRCOTE Museum (Spanish: Museo de la DIRCOTE) is a museum located on the premises of the National Directorate against Terrorism (DIRCOTE) on Spain Avenue in the historic centre of Lima, managed by the National Police of Peru and which exhibits objects seized from the Shining Path and Túpac Amaru Revolutionary Movement (MRTA) terrorist groups during the internal armed conflict that devastated Peru during the 1980s and 1990s.

== Overview ==
The museum, which consists of two rooms, is not open to the public and is accessible by appointment only to members of the police, journalists and educational centres. It was born from the institutional exhibition of objects seized during police operations and that were shown on the anniversaries of the capture of the Shining Path leader Abimael Guzmán on September 12, 1992, during Operation Victoria by members of the GEIN.

The collection of the museum, also known as the DIRCOTE's "trophy room", displays around 1,200 objects such as posters, paintings, documentation, photographs, books, videos, weapons, as well as gifts and personal objects of Guzmán and of Víctor Polay Campos of the MRTA, among others.

== See also ==
- Place of Memory, Tolerance and Social Inclusion
