= Special Intelligence Group =

Peruvian intelligence agency

- Grupo Especial de Inteligencia
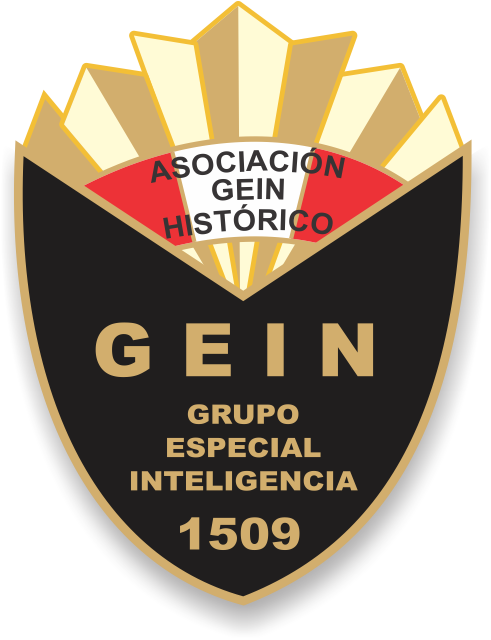

Special Branch overview
- Formed: March 5, 1990
- Dissolved: October 3, 1993
- Superseding Special Branch: DIRCOTE
- Jurisdiction: Peru
- Headquarters: Lima
- Employees: 86
- Annual budget: US$ 1,500 (monthly)
- Special Branch executive: Marco Miyashiro, Commander

The Special Intelligence Group (Spanish: Grupo Especial de Inteligencia, GEIN) was a special branch of the National Police of Peru (PNP) that responsible for clandestine and covert operations, counterinsurgency, counterintelligence, domestic counterterrorism, intelligence gathering and assessment on threats to the persons or groups that acts as a threat to public security that are under the responsibility of the police authority, and support investigation complex cases.

It was created within its Dirección contra el terrorismo (DIRCOTE) with the purpose of counterinsurgency, counterintelligence, intelligence gathering and assessment on threats to the persons or groups that acts as a threat to public security, and locating and capturing the leadership bodies of domestic terrorist groups operating since 1980: the Shining Path and the Túpac Amaru Revolutionary Movement.

This unit is historically remembered for having carried out the capture of Shining Path leader Abimael Guzmán, who was arrested along with part of his central committee on September 12, 1992. It was dissolved on October 3, 1993, becoming the Regional Terrorism Investigation Department 1 (Spanish: Departamento de Investigación de Terrorismo Regional 1, DITER 1). For their work, the group's former members were declared "Heroes of Democracy" by Peru's Congress in 2017.

== Establishment ==
The GEIN was created on March 5, 1990 during the first presidency of Alan García, with Agustín Mantilla Campos as Minister of the Interior and PNP Lieutenant General Fernando Reyes Roca as Senior Director. The founding members of the GEIN were Colonel Manuel Tumba Ortega, Major Benedicto Jiménez Bacca, Captain Félix Castro Tenorio, Lieutenant Joe Sánchez Alva, Second Lieutenant Jorge Augusto Luna Chu and Agent Jaime Cubas Hidalgo. As a reference, the GEIN adopted the thought of the Chinese philosopher Sun Tzu to confront Gonzalo Thought and Marxism in general.

== Operational history ==
During its three-year history, the GEIN participated in a number of counter-subversive operations. Its best known operation, code-named "Operation Victoria", is the 1992 capture of Shining Path leader Abimael Guzmán.

=== Operation ISA ===
Operation ISA (Spanish: Operación ISA) was the group's first operation against the Shining Path. It began after an anonymous letter was left at Jorge Chávez International Airport by a woman whose daughter had been kidnapped by the group, begging authorities to investigate a woman known as Judith Díaz Contreras ("Comrade Isa"), an administrative employee at the National Agrarian University who had already been detained in 1985 but released. The letter included the address of a house where youngsters were indoctrinated on Marxism and recruited into the Shining Path. Díaz was a member of the Shining Path's Grupo de Apoyo Partidario (GAP), which was led by Carlos Manuel Torres Mendoza ("Comrade Javier") and hid terrorists that arrived in Lima. Meanwhile, the Departamento de Apoyo Organizativo (DAO) was led by Elvia Nila Zanabria Pacheco ("Comrade Juana") and served as a link with the group's leadership and as an archival group for newspaper clippings.

An intelligence operation took place from March 5 to June 1, 1990, ending with a raid on three houses in La Victoria, Monterrico, and Chorrillos. It led to the capture of 22 suspects, tons of documents, and the dissolution of the two entities of the group. The house in Monterrico Norte was of particular interest. Located at number 459 of Calle 2, it had been rented since March 1989 by Rosa Hasemberg Armh, a collaborator of the group, with Guzmán living in the building for the rest of the year.

=== Operation Monterrico-90 ===
Operation Monterrico-90 (Spanish: Operación Monterrico-90) took place from June 3 to September 19, 1990. It also targeted the group's propaganda apparatus, leading to the capture of the Aparato Central de prensa y propaganda of the Shining Path's central committee.

=== Operation Caballero ===
Operation Caballero (Spanish: Operación Caballero) took place from October 10, 1990, to January 31, 1991. It targeted the group's Central Directorate, operating in a house code-named "El Palomar", located at 265 Buena Vista, in Chacarilla del Estanque. This operation led to the capture of a video cassette that featured recent images of the group's central committee, including Augusta La Torre and a drunk Guzmán dancing to Zorba's Dance.

=== Operation Seso ===
Operation Seso (Spanish: Operación Seso) targeted the "translations" group (or Popular Intellectual Group), which was tasked with translating documents and books in another language that were sent to Abimael Guzmán from abroad into Spanish. This group depended directly on the Central Directorate. Documents of a subversive nature were seized, translations of subversive propaganda to be sent to different countries and documents of contacts with Shining Path members who resided abroad.

=== Operation Fortuna ===
Operation Fortuna (Spanish: Operación Fortuna) sought the identification and capture of escapees from Castro Castro Prison. The group, which had escaped through a tunnel in July 1990, were part of the Túpac Amaru Revolutionary Movement (MRTA)'s National Directorate, having previously participated in a number of attacks. It led to the dissolution of the Escuela Central de cuadros y dirigentes principales del MRTA through a series of raids on different houses in the city.

=== Operation Ancón ===
Operation Ancón (Spanish: Operación Ancón) lasted from May 10 to June 22, 1991. Intelligence work was carried out based on secret documents found in the first two buildings where Abimael Guzmán had lived ("ISA" and "El Palomar"), focused on dismantling the Fundamental Committee of "Socorro Popular", which was in charge of the legal defence of Shining Path members. It also looked after the health of its members and was in charge of organising protest mobilizations at a national level, committing murders and various attacks, complying with the directives sent to it by the Central Committee. Firearms, explosives, fuses, detonators, plans for annihilation against members of the PNP and the Armed Forces, attacks against police, state and private entities, a large amount of subversive propaganda, and manuscripts of the organization were seized. All of the detainees had participated in different terrorist actions.

=== Operation Palacio ===
Operation Palacio (Spanish: Operación Palacio) lasted from July 10 to November 28, 1991. These detainees formed part of the Political Apparatus of the Defence Department of "Socorro Popular," who carried out terrorist actions in the southern area of Lima, with their respective detachments and defense militias. Firearms, explosives, fuses, detonators, plans and sketches of attacks and subversive propaganda were seized from all of them.

=== Operation Hipócrates ===
Operation Hipócrates (Spanish: Operación Hipócrates) took place from December 15, 1991 to February 26, 1992. The intelligence work was carried out with the documents found in the two buildings where Abimael Guzmán lived and its purpose was to arrest the members of the Health Apparatus of "Socorro Popular", which was made up of nurses, doctors and medical students, the same ones who treated the wounded as a result of confrontations with the Military and Police Forces, and the sick who arrived from the countryside. For this purpose, they had several premises with operating rooms, surgical instruments and medicines stolen from the different hospitals in the capital.

=== Operation Moyano ===
Operation Moyano (Spanish: Operación Moyano) lasted from March 15 to April 13, 1992. It was aimed at dismantling the cell that ran the newspaper El Diario, which was the mouthpiece of Shining Path and circulated clandestinely at the national and international level.

=== Operation Huascaura ===
Operation Huascaura (Spanish: Operación Huascaura) targeted Luis Arana Franco, who was in charge of the Shining Path's logistics and finances. His arrest took place on June 22, 1992, after having visited his family during curfew.

=== Operation Victoria ===
Operation Victoria took place on September 12, 1992, and is the group's best known operation. After months of GEIN surveillance, a house in Surquillo, a residential district of Lima, was intervened by two members who subdued the house's four members, which included leader Abimael Guzmán (codenamed "cachetón") and high-ranking member Elena Yparraguirre. The capture of the group's leadership led to its eventual downfall.

== In popular culture ==
The group is featured in the 2017 Peruvian film The Last Hour.

== See also ==
- History of Peru (1980–2000)
- Peruvian conflict
