= Osmán Morote =

Peruvian terrorist

- Born: April 15, 1945 (age 81); Cuzco, Peru
- Other names: Comrade Nicolás; Comrade Remigio
- Organization: Shining Path
- Parent(s): Efraín Morote Best; Leila Barrionuevo
- Criminal charges: Terrorism
- Penalty: Life imprisonment

Osmán Roberto Morote Barrionuevo, also known as Comrade Nicolas or Comrade Remigio, is a Peruvian anthropologist and former member of the Shining Path, once becoming the group's second-in-command. His father and two siblings—Arturo and Katia—also became members of the group.

== Biography ==
Morote was born in Cuzco to parents Efraín Morote Best and Leila Barrionuevo. His maternal grandfather was writer Roberto Barrionuevo Navarro. His two siblings are Arturo and Katia. In 1970, he married Teresa Durán Araujo, sister of Maximiliano Durán, a member of the Shining Path.

He studied anthropology at San Cristóbal of Huamanga University, where he met philosophy professor Abimael Guzmán and adopted maoism as an ideology.

He was arrested by the Peruvian police on June 11, 1988, on terrorism charges, and was sentenced to 20 years in prison. In March 1992, he appealed to the Supreme Court of Peru and his sentence was reduced to 15 years. The same year, President Alberto Fujimori's regime opened a new trial and Morote was sentenced to life in prison. A new trial started in June 2003.

In 2024, Morote requested a review of his sentencing and a release from prison as he had served 35 years of his sentence. His request for release was denied.
