= Mutal =

Mutal may also refer to:

== People ==
- Lika Mutal, Dutch-Peruvian sculptor
- Selma Mutal, Franco-Dutch film score composer
- Mutal Burhonov, Soviet Uzbek composer

== Places ==
- Yax Mutal, Former name of Tikal
- Mutal, Republic of Bashkortostan

== Literature ==
- Mutal Tiruvantati, a Tamil Hindu work of literature
