= The Last Hour (2017 film) =

La hora final
- Theatrical release poster
- Directed by: Eduardo Mendoza de Echave
- Written by: Eduardo Mendoza de Echave
- Produced by: Eduardo Mendoza de Echave; Gustavo Sánchez
- Starring: Pietro Sibille; Nidia Bermejo
- Cinematography: Julián Amaru Estrada
- Edited by: Danielle Fillios
- Music by: Jorge "Chino" Sabogal
- Production companies: Séptimo Sello; La Soga producciones
- Distributed by: BF Distribution
- Release date: September 14, 2017
- Running time: 118 minutes
- Country: Peru
- Language: Spanish

The Last Hour (Spanish: La hora final) is a 2017 Peruvian crime drama thriller film written, co-produced and directed by Eduardo Mendoza de Echave. It stars Pietro Sibille & Nidia Bermejo. It is based on real events and set at the beginning of the 1990s, a time of terrorism in Peru, specifically during Operation Victoria, which led to the capture of the terrorist leader Abimael Guzmán.

== Synopsis ==
Narrates the investigation process carried out by the Grupo Especial de Inteligencia del Perú (GEIN) to catch the leader of Shining Path. A close relationship between agents Carlos Zambrano and Gabriela Coronado, characters who carry frustrations and who try to hide their fears with their police work.

== Cast ==
The actors participating in this film are:

- Pietro Sibille as Carlos Zambrano
- Nidia Bermejo as Gabriela Coronado
- Toño Vega as Bernales
- Carlos Mesta as General Vidales
- Tommy Párraga as Fidel Coronado
- Fausto Molina as Gonzalo Zambrano
- Katerina D'Onofrio as Cecilia
- Haysen Percovich as "El Negro"
- Emilram Cossio as "Químico"
- Tony Dulzaides as Pablo Pérez
- Iván Chávez as José
- Miguel Vargas as Abimael Guzmán Reinoso
- Vanessa Vizcarra as Elena Yparraguirre
- Alejandra Saba as Maritza Garrido-Lecca
- Sandro Calderón as Luis Alberto "Sotil" Arana Franco
- Diego Seminario as Inchaustegui
- Herbert Corimanya as Valencia
- Renato Rueda as "Chupito"
- Alberick García as member of Grupo Colina
- Francois Macedo as member of Grupo Colina
- Christian Pacora as member of Grupo Colina
- Omar Estrada as "Pelé"
- Paul Beretta as Carrillo
- Fernando Pasco as Zambrano house owner
- Gustavo Mayer as Alfredo
- Melissa Giorgio as Paloma
- Roberto Ruiz as Gutiérrez
- Fernando Colichón as Squirrel
- Sarahi Poma as Seagull

== Production ==
The creation of the film was announced by Eduardo Mendoza de Echave himself in 2015 as a project to revalue the events of the era of terrorism. Between January and February 2017, principal photography began, where Mendoza repeated that the main objective of the film was to reach young audiences.

== Release ==
The Last Hour was initially scheduled to be released on September 12, 2017, the date on which in 1992 it was captured in a house on what is now Calle Varsovia in the Los Sauces urbanization of the Surquillo district in Lima during Operation Victoria, but its premiere moved to September 14 for unknown reasons. After its theatrical release, on June 15, 2018 it was released internationally on Netflix.

== Reception ==
The Last Hour was seen by 13,000 viewers on its first day increasing to 25,500 on its second day. By the end of its opening weekend, the film drew 70,000 viewers. In its seventh week in theaters, the film drew 224,732 viewers.
