= Carlos Tapia García =

Peruvian politician, researcher, analyst, editor, and engineer (1941–2021)

Carlos Tapia
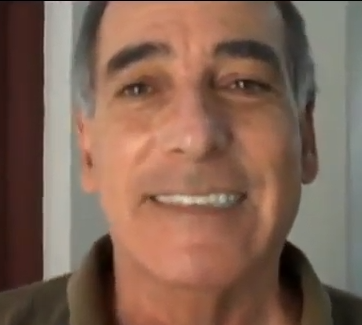

Truth and Reconciliation Commissioner
- In office 2001–2003
- President: Valentín Paniagua; Alejandro Toledo
- Preceded by: Mary Beame (1977)
- Succeeded by: Donna Hanover

Deputy of the Chamber of Deputies of Peru for Lima Metropolitan
- In office July 28, 1985 – July 27, 1990

Personal details
- Born: July 11, 1941 Lima, Peru
- Died: January 19, 2021 (aged 79) Lima, Peru
- Party: United Left
- Education: San Cristóbal of Huamanga University

Carlos Tapia García (July 11, 1941 – January 19, 2021) was a Peruvian politician, researcher, analyst, editor, and engineer. He served in the Chamber of Deputies of Peru, the former lower house of Congress, from 1985 to 1990 as a member of the United Left alliance. He was later appointed a Commissioner on the Truth and Reconciliation Commission, which investigated human rights abuses committed by Shining Path and other groups during the Internal conflict in Peru in the 1980s and 1990s. Tapia served on the truth commission from 2001 to 2003.

Tapia died from COVID-19 at the Edgardo Rebagliati Martins National Hospital in Lima on January 19, 2021, at the age of 79.
