= Claudia Salazar Jiménez =

Peruvian writer (born 1976)

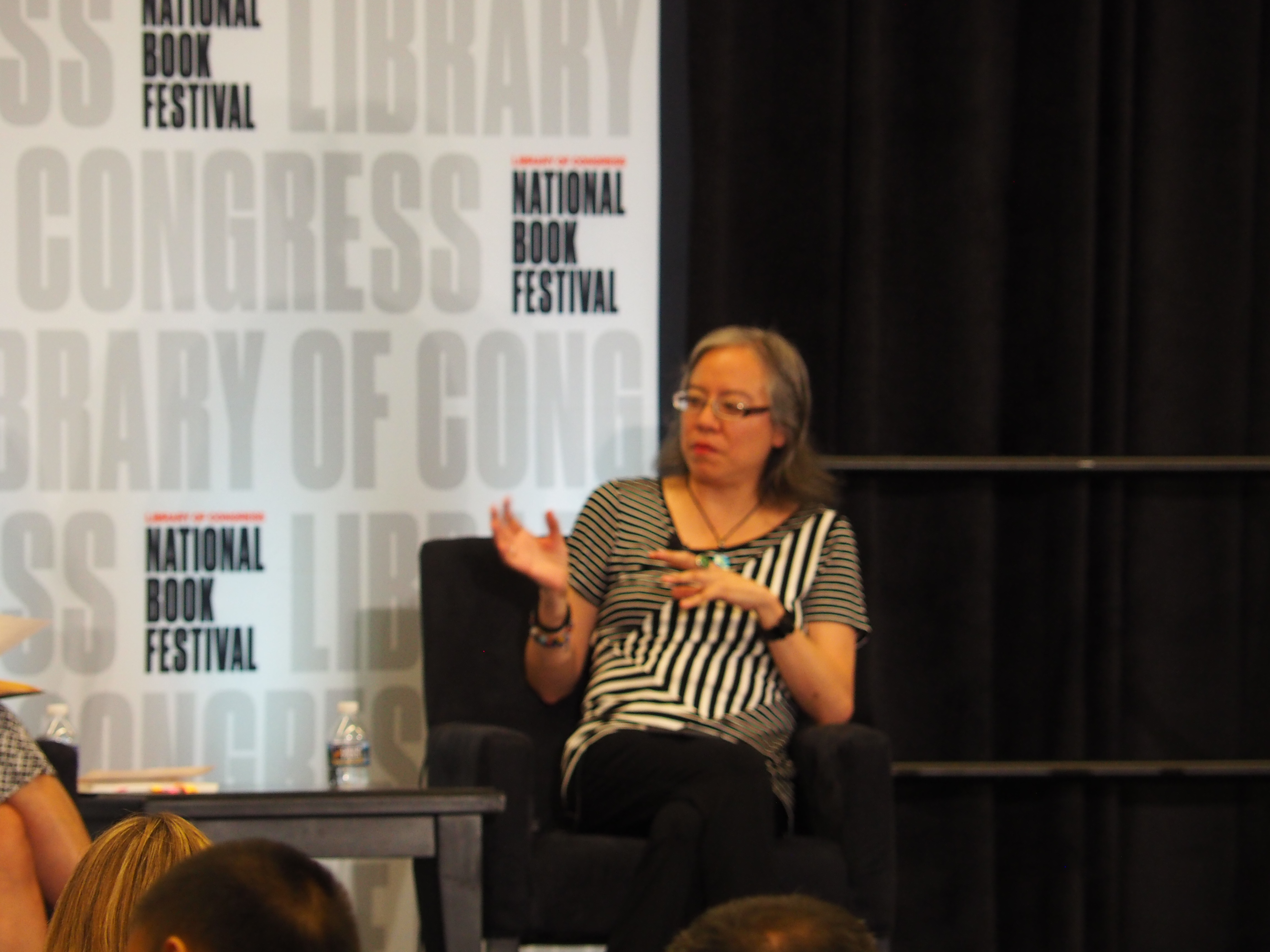
- Salazar Jiménez at the National Book Festival, 2019
- Born: 5 July 1976 (age 50); Lima, Peru
- Education: National University of San Marcos; New York University
- Occupations: Writer, editor

Claudia Salazar Jiménez (born 1976) is a Peruvian writer, editor, academic and cultural manager. Her first novel Blood of the Dawn, set in Peru during the times of internal unrest in the 1980s, was awarded Premio Las Américas.

== Early life and education ==
Claudia Salazar Jiménez was born on 5 July, 1976, in Lima, Peru. She attended the National University of San Marcos, where she studied literature, then she completed doctoral studies in Latin American literature at the New York University.

== Career ==
Claudia Salazar Jiménez is regarded as one of the prominent literary voices of her generation in Peru. She funded the Fuegos de Arena literary magazine and edited Latin American literature anthologies, such as Escribir en Nueva York. Antología de narradores hispanoamericanos. She also published her own short fiction in journals and anthologies, such as Basta. 100 mujeres contra la violencia de género (2012) or Denominación de origen: Perú. Antología del cuento peruano (2014). She was awarded Premio TUMI a la Excelencia Profesional.

Her debut novel Blood of the Dawn (La sangre de la aurora) was published in 2013. The work, written from a woman's point of view and set in the '80s in Peru, during the times of internal unrest and the Shining Path, was one of the first in Peru to focus on exploring the links between gender-based violence, ethnicity and race of that period, criticising violence against Quechua women and showing their ways of resisting. The novel won the Premio Las Américas (2014). In a review written for NPR, Michael Schaub called the book "beautiful, horrifying work of art".

Apart from her literary work, Salazar Jiménez also applies herself as a cultural manager; she founded and headed PeruFest, which was the first Peruvian cinema festival in the city of New York.

She was professor at Sarah Lawrence College and, as of 2023, is part of the faculty of California State Polytechnic University, Pomona, where her area of expertise is, among others, Latin American literature and creative writing. She is the recipient of Premio Sylvia Molloy award for her academic work.

== Works ==
=== as author ===
- La sangre de la aurora, 2013, English edition: Blood of the Dawn, trans. by Elizabeth Bryer
- Coordenadas temporales, 2016
- 1814, año de la Independencia, 2017
- Migrar y otras artes. Escritos fuera de lugar, 2024

=== as editor ===
- Voces para Lilith. Literatura contemporánea de temática lésbica en Sudamérica, 2011
- Escribir en Nueva York. Antología de narradores hispanoamericanos, 2014
- Pachakuti feminista. Ensayos y testimonios sobre arte, escritura y pensamiento feminista en el Perú contemporáneo, 2020
