= The Eye that Cries =

Monument in Jesús María, Lima, Peru

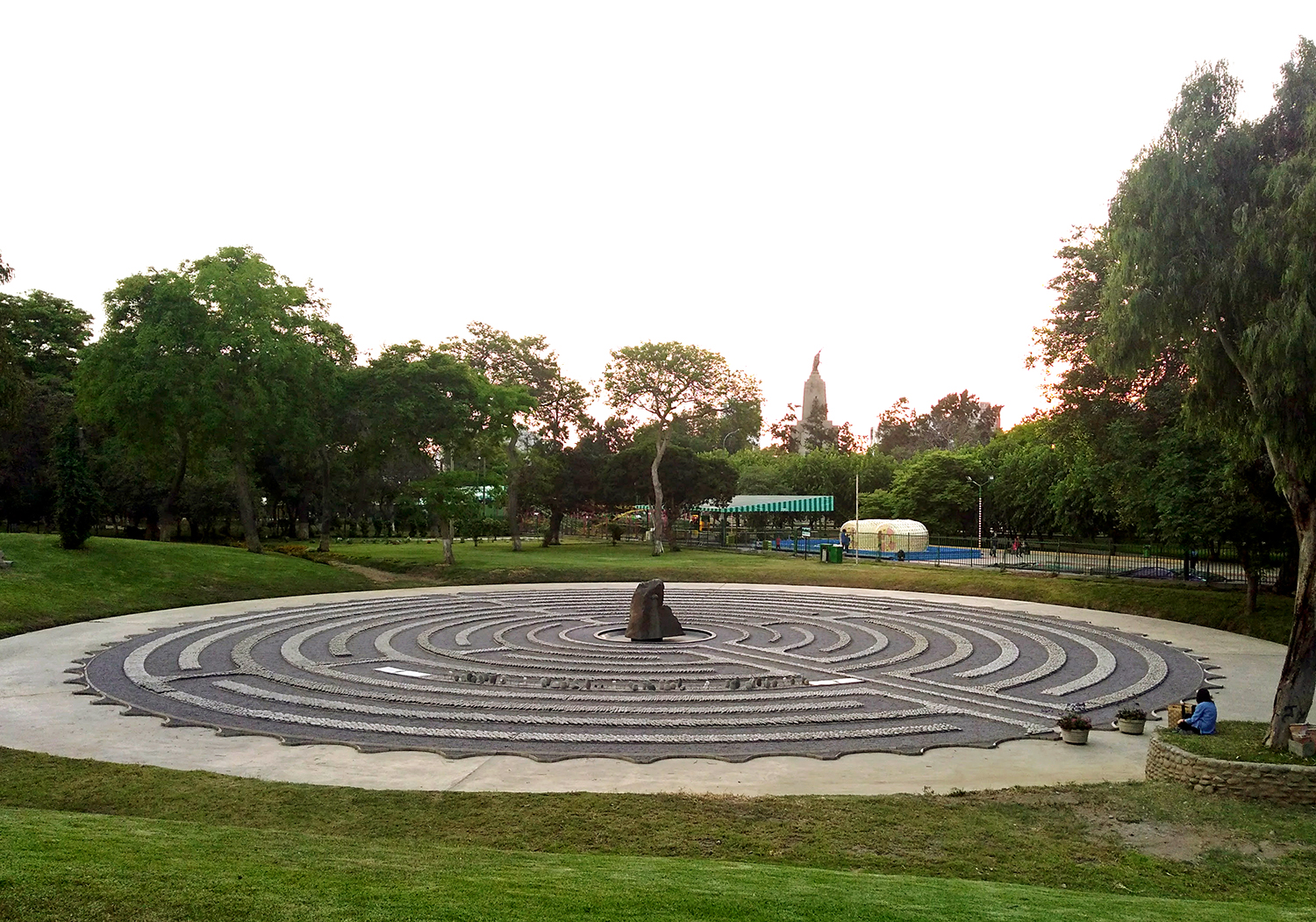
- The Eye That Cries
- Location: El Campo de Marte in Lima, Peru
- Coordinates: 12.06737°S 77.03989°W
- Designer: Lika Mutal
- Beginning date: 28 August 2005

The Eye that Cries (El Ojo que Llora in Spanish) is a memorial that was born as a private initiative designed to honor the thousands of victims of the internal conflict in Peru, to strengthen the collective memory of all Peruvians and to promote peace and reconciliation in the country.

The Eye that Cries is part of a larger project called The Memory Alameda which will incorporate other art pieces, large extensions of green areas and the Museum of Memory (Yuyanapaq).

== History ==
The memorial, The Eye That Cries, located in El Campo de Marte, a park in Jesús María District, Lima was completed in 2005. It was conceptualized and executed by Lika Mutal, an originally Dutch artist who lives and works in both New York and Lima. At the center of the memorial is a black stone which Mutal discovered near a pre-Columbian cemetery.

The memorial was built primarily as a way to commemorate the roughly 70,000 victims of the violence committed by both the Peruvian military government and the radical guerrilla group attempting to fight against the government and all those who opposed their communist ideologies. The primary guerrilla group was the Shining Path (Sendero Luminoso in Spanish), a radically communist terrorist group who resisted those who opposed them through radical actions, including violence. The government armed forces only added to the violence by fighting the guerrilla group. Most of the crimes, which took place in a span of twenty years (1980–2000) remained unspoken of until the Peruvian Commission of Truth and Reconciliation (Comisión de Verdad y Reconciliación in Spanish) brought them to the public. After President Alberto Fujimori fled the country in 2000, human rights committees and the Truth and Reconciliation Commission began the process of reconciling the crimes that had occurred.

The Peruvian Commission of Truth and Reconciliation (CVR) filed a public report in 2003 where it spoke of the crimes that occurred during those two decades, and the rulings placed pressure on the Peruvian government to commemorate all of the victims. The CVR's extensive report stated that during those two decades of violence, 69,280 people had either died or disappeared, roughly 600,000 people became internal refugees, and 40,000 children became orphans. The truth commission also reported that the majority of the victims of the crimes were indigenous victims who lived in isolated highlands. The report stated that three out of four victims of the brutal crimes were indigenous, roughly 85 percent of all of the victims. The fact that the indigenous were one of the most marginalized groups in society and that they lived in highlands away from main cities made it easy for the crimes of the Senderos and the military officials to go unreported. Their marginalization and their isolation made this highly victimized group silent and they were powerless both against the guerrilla group and the government.

Though the members of the Shining Path contributed to over half of the roughly 70,000 people killed during this twenty-year period, 41 members were still added to the names of the victims in The Eye That Cries memorial. The reason these members were added was due to an armed conflict that occurred in 1992 in Miguel Castro Castro prison. Important leaders of the radical guerrilla were captured and imprisoned in Miguel Castro Castro penitentiary. In 1992 in Castro Castro, there was a military raid in which forty-one Senderos were targeted and killed during the span of four days. The names of those forty-one Senderos among the victims listed in The Eye That Cries would later cause a controversy since a large portion of the deaths had been at the hands of Senderos. Peruvians considered the Senderos to be terrorists as opposed to victims.

=== Fujimori and the role of the Peruvian Truth and Reconciliation Commission ===
Evidence of Fujimori's corrupt government surfaced and led him to flee to Japan in 2000. Due to the massive amount of corruption during Alberto Fujimori's presidential terms that included blackmail, bribes, and vote-rigging, an investigation into his administration began in 2000 that was led by Alejandro Toledo. The Peruvian government was then urged by human rights organizations to form the Peruvian Truth and Reconciliation Commission (CVR) which would investigate the political violence, human rights violations, and government corruption that had afflicted Peru since the 1980s and during Fujimori's presidential terms. When the CVR finished its final report in August 2003, it recommended that to help aid the process of reconciliation, memorials need to be created to pay tribute to the many victims of political violence in Peru. In 2004, Jesus Maria, a district in Lima, was designated as the location for the project Alameda de La Memoria which would give an actual place to the many marginalized voices that were silenced and victimized during the decades of Peruvian conflict. Alameda de la Memoria would provide a space to contemplate and remember, not only for the victims and their families, but also for the Peruvian population. This project would be located in the park Campo de Marte, and would include the memorial The Eye that Cries.

== Controversy ==
When Lika Mutal began to work on creating The Eye That Cries, she was given a list of names of individuals who were considered to be victims of violence. This list of names was supplied by the TRC, and she would later incorporate the nearly 32,000 names into the monument. Unknown to her, the list of names she was given included not only the thousands of victims who were killed during decades of Peru's armed conflict, but also the names of 41 victims who were killed in Castro Castro Prison during a prison raid in May 1992. The victims killed during the Castro Castro Prison raid were "organizers and militants of the Shining Path, Peru's notorious guerrilla movement. A large number of the Peruvian population views the members of the Shining Path as terrorists responsible for a majority of the deaths of victims of armed conflict in Peru during the 1980s and 1990s. The inclusion of the names of those murdered due to political unrest, guerrilla attacks, and prison raids creates a clash when at times both victims and perpetrators are included side by side and deemed as victims. This conflict leads to the question of what constitutes a victim, who has the right to judge whether an individual is a victim, and whether a criminal can be considered a victim. From the perspective of International Human Rights Laws "those killed extra judicially, including convicted criminals" are considered victims. Yet, from the perspective of a majority of the Peruvian population, the members of Shining Path were considered to be terrorists responsible for mass murders and destruction.

When Like Mutal completed The Eye That Cries in 2005, it did not create any major controversies, as both the artist, and the Peruvian Population were unaware that the names of 41 Senderistas were included among the 32,000 names of victims written in stones. In November 2006, a ruling by the Inter-American Court on Human Rights based on investigations of the prison raid in Castro Castro and the deaths of the 41 inmates, stated that these deaths were a violation of human rights. After being accused of human rights violations, Peru was instructed to give reparations to the families of the Castro Castro victims and give a public acknowledgment and ceremony that paid honor to the victims and the families of those whose human rights were violated in the Castro Castro raid. In addition, the ruling of the Inter-American Court stated that the names of these victims be included in The Eye that Cries monument within the coming year.

When the rulings of the Inter American Court in 2006 became known, the public and the press expressed outrage. Although the prisoners of the Castro Castro prison had indeed suffered human rights violations, they were still deemed "terrorists" by the majority of the Peruvian public and press. The idea that victims and "their perpetrators'" names would be combined under a monument that symbolized reconciliation and a place for family members to mourn their lost ones was one that the Peruvian public was not willing to support. What was ironic though, was that the names of the Castro Castro prison victims had been included in The Eye that Cries since 2005. It took well over one year for the Peruvian press to become aware of this transgression, and it was only because of the ruling of the Inter American Court that the subject itself was brought to light. The differing opinions regarding The Eye that Cries halted the completion of the Memory Alameda, which if realized would have been a three part installation.

=== Vandalism ===
In September 2007, Alberto Fujimori was extradited from Chile to Peru where he would stand trial for the violations of human rights and corruption that occurred during his presidential terms. The day after Alberto Fujimori arrived in Lima, Peru, a group of men and women vandalized The Eye that Cries by destroying stones and pouring orange paint on the central stone, and then littering the monument with paint cans. It is believed that the group members responsible for this act of vandalism were supporters of Alberto Fujimori's government not only because of the proximity of Fujimori's arrival and the attack, but because orange is the color of Fujimori's campaign.

=== Lika Mutal's response to controversy ===
In an interview done by El Comercio, Lika Mutal was asked if she would include the names of the 41 victims murdered in the Castro Castro prison raid in her monument. She responded by saying that, "I couldn't. They were criminals, killed outside the rule of law, but criminals nonetheless. If reparations have to be granted to their families, the reparations should be directed to remedy the damage they caused." When it was discovered that the names of terrorists had been included in The Eye that Cries monument, Lika Mutal responded in an interview with La Republica by saying that she had no knowledge that the names of terrorists were included in the stones. She said that the list given to her by the CVR was marked as the registry that included all of the victims.

== Artist's inspiration and description of monument ==
After visiting the Yuyanapaq exhibit, that narrates the more than twenty years of armed conflict in Peru through photographs, Lika Mutal felt inspired. Working primarily with stone, Lika returned to her studio, where she viewed her artistic medium with a new perspective. She says that upon seeing the stone, the phrase "The Eye that Cries" formed in her head. After this moment, she decided to work on this project, and through private sponsors and donations was able to accumulate the necessary funds for The Eye that Cries.

The Eye that Cries is located in the middle of a labyrinth. The labyrinth itself is composed of tens of thousands of rocks. Each individual rock is inscribed with a name, age, and year of death of a victim of Peru's decades of internal conflict. The sculpture is representative of Pachamama, which in Quechua means Mother Earth. In the center of the sculpture, a small stone that takes the form of an eye continuously trickles water.

== Social implications ==
For the survivors, family, and friends of the victims of the violent crimes, The Eye That Cries memorial is a place where they are able to mourn the loss of loved ones. This memorial captures all of the loss, and suffering of the people who were affected by the crimes. For the family members whose loved ones were part of the large group of people who disappeared, the memorial is the only place they are able to mourn and remember.

Many mourners come to the memorial and leave flowers next to the stone with the name of their loved one as a way to supplement the fact that their body was never recovered. Having this common, public place to remember has become an important way of keeping the memory alive. The site is a way for Peruvian citizens to attempt to reconcile all the crimes that were committed; along with having a site to mourn their dead, the memorial served as a way to finally publicly display the violent and complicated history of Peru. The memory of the dead and violence that Peru has experienced also serves as a way to strengthen democratic ideologies. The memorial site also has annual events such as a ceremony on El Dia De Los Muertos, along with serving as a location of Buddhist prayer ceremonies. The ruling of the Inter-American court and subsequent controversy has led to an increase in popularity and visits to the memorial site.

== See also ==
- Place of Memory, Tolerance and Social Inclusion
- Internal conflict in Peru
- Truth and Reconciliation Commission (Peru)
- Human rights in Peru
- Shining Path
