= Luzmila Chiricente Mahuanca =

Peruvian Asháninka activist (born 1953)

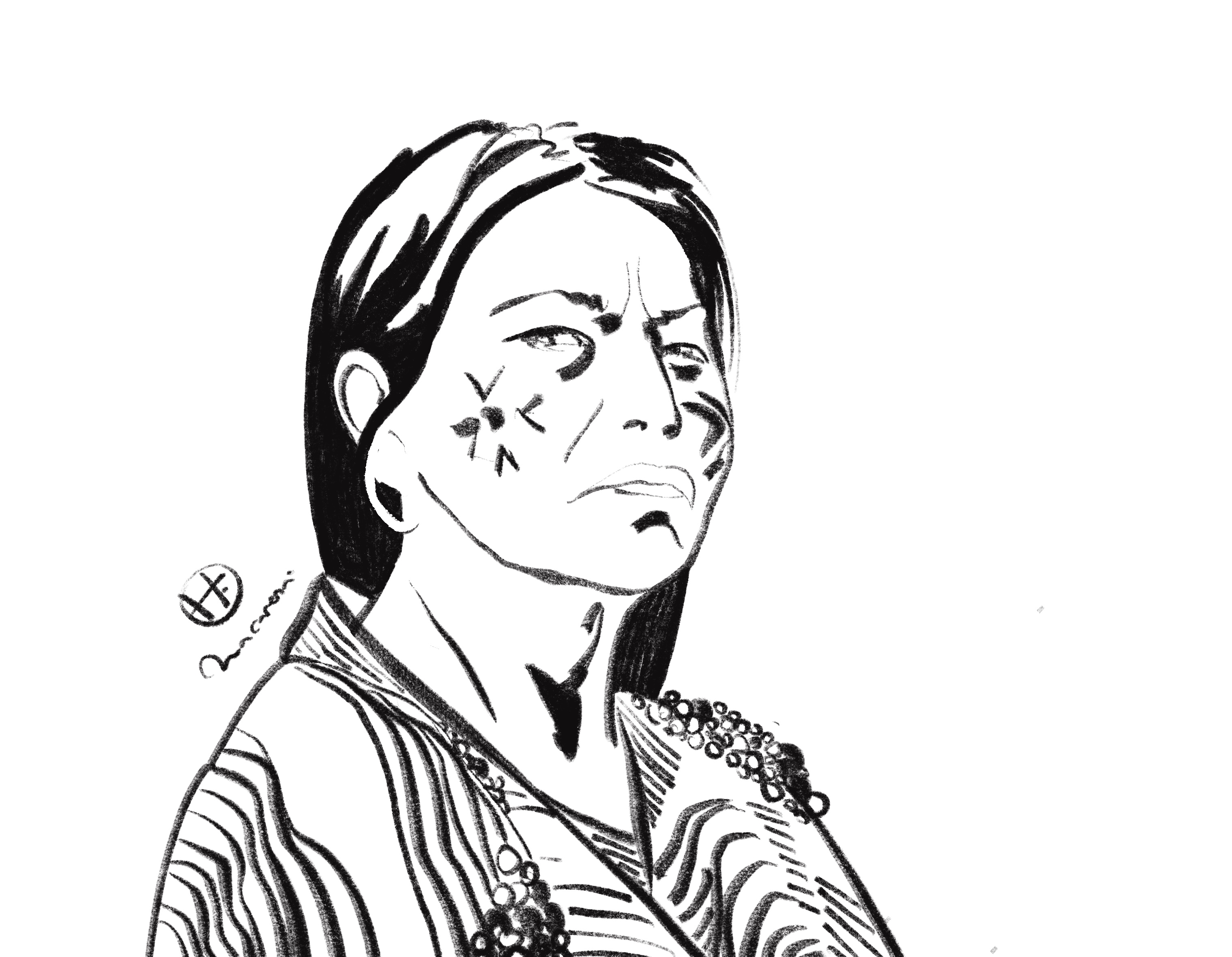
- Born: 1953 (age 72–73); Cushiviani, Río Negro District, Junín province, Department of Junín, Peru
- Occupations: Asháninka leader Human rights activist
- Children: 5

Luzmila Chiricente Mahuanca (born 1953) is a Peruvian Asháninka leader and human rights activist for indigenous communities in the Amazon. She is the founder and president of the Federación Regional de Mujeres Indígenas Asháninkas, Nomatsiguengas y Kakintes de la Selva Central (FREMANK; lit. 'Regional Federation of Asháninka, Nomatsiguenga and Kakinte Indigenous Women of Selva Central'), and a member of the Consejo de Reparaciones (lit. 'Council for Reparations') for victims of the internal conflict in Peru.

== Biography ==
Chiricente Mahuanca was born and raised in Cushiviani, Río Negro District, Satipo Province, Department of Junín. In 1972, she began participating in the public life of the Asháninka community in Cushiviani and became recognised as a local leader, and later as a regional and national leader, of the community. Chiricente Mahuanca was one of the first indigenous women in Peru to attain strategic positions in indigenous organisations, and became known as a defender of Asháninka, Nomatsiguenga and Kakinte interests. She worked at the Club de Madres (lit. 'Mothers' Club') and was secretary of the Junta Directiva Comunal (lit. 'Communal Board of Directors'), where she successfully fought for Cushiviani to obtain a primary school, a doctor's office and a community centre.

In 1983, Chiricente Mahuanca began co-ordinating women's activities in the Tambo River basin and was elected vice president of the Federación de Comunidades nativas campas-ashaninka (FECONACA; lit. 'Federation of Campa-Asháninka Native Communities'). She worked to promote the rights of indigenous people to participate in and be consulted on local and regional development, particularly indigenous women. Chiricente Mahuanca also led workshops on intercultural health in the Tambo River basin.

Chiricente Mahuanca's time as an indigenous leader coincided with the internal conflict in Peru; she and other indigenous leaders were threatened by the Shining Path, a guerrilla group. She herself received death threats, and in 1988, her fourteen-year-old son Juan was kidnapped. Chiricente Mahuanca led peaceful demonstrations in Satipo alongside civil society organisations including the Centro Amazónico de Antropología y Aplicación Práctica, the Instituto de Defensa Legal, the Centro de Investigación para la Amazónia and the Flora Tristán Peruvian Women's Centre. She also worked with international groups such as the Red Cross and the United Nations, to carry out workshops, rescuing captives, and attending conferences.

In 1995, Chiricente Mahuanca accompanied UN representative Francis Deng on a visit to Selva Central. She began serving as a regular contact between national and international organisations and indigenous communities in the area.

In 1996, Chiricente Mahuanca began a series of visits to communities in Pangoa District and the Tambo River basin to take part in education sessions with women on their rights, as well as about the protection of indigenous territories. She contributed to the establishment of an ombudsman for indigenous affairs in Satipo. In 1999, Chiricente Mahuanca founded the Federación Regional de Mujeres Indígenas Asháninkas, Nomatsiguengas y Kakintes de la Selva Central which offered support to 44 indigenous communities in five districts of Peru. It focused on addressing issues of domestic abuse, child malnutrition, and the defence of indigenous territories from invasions from settlers, loggers and oil companies.

Between 2002 and 2003, Chiricente Mahuanca participated in the Truth and Reconciliation Commission in Satipo, accompanying interviewers and translating testimonies collected from indigenous people. In 2012, she was appointed as a member of the Consejo de Reparaciones and supported thousands of indigenous people to register for the Registro Único de Víctimas (lit. 'Single Registry of Victims').

Alongside Elsa Casancho Peralta, Abelina Ampinti Shiñugari and Ketty Marcelo López, Chiricente Mahuanca has worked to defend the rights of women in Selva Central, including using canoes and trucks to deliver aid and support to remote indigenous territories.

== Recognition ==
In 2014, Chiricente Mahuanca was named Personalidad Meritoria de la Cultura (lit. 'Meritorious Personality of Culture') by the Ministry of Culture for her defence of the cultural rights of Asháninka people.
