= Place of Memory, Tolerance and Social Inclusion =

Museum in Lima, Peru

- Lugar de la Memoria, la Tolerancia y la Inclusión Social

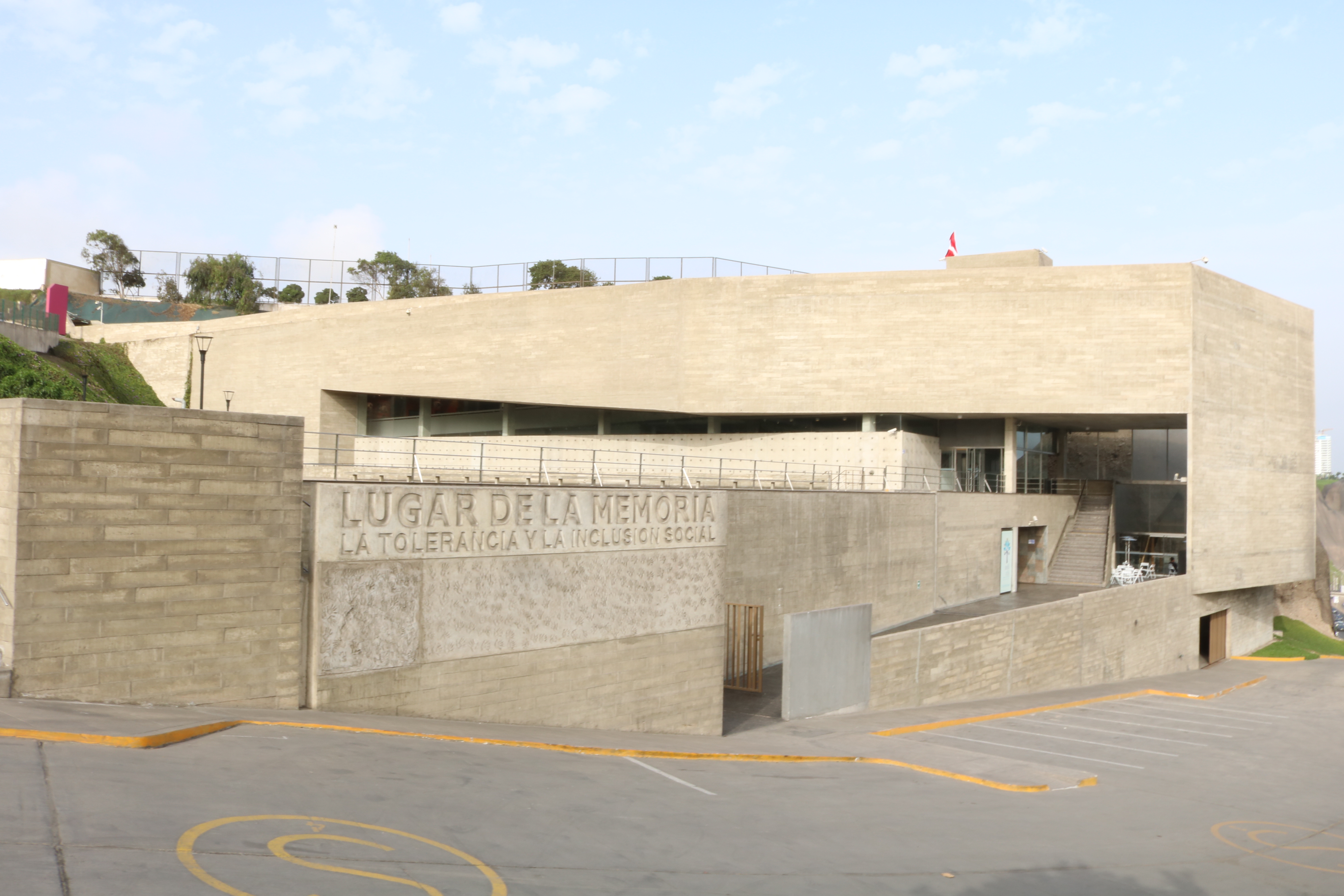
- Established: 17 December 2015
- Coordinates: 12.1100°S 77.0539°W
- Owner: Ministry of Culture (Peru)
- Website: lum.cultura.pe

The Place of Memory, Tolerance and Social Inclusion (Spanish: Lugar de la Memoria, la Tolerancia y la Inclusión Social, LUM) is a museum in Lima, Peru, dedicated to the Peruvian internal conflict of the 1980s and 1990s. It opened in 2015 and is managed by the Ministry of Culture. The LUM seeks to memorialize the victims of the conflict and provide a forum where different viewpoints on the conflict can be discussed.

== History ==
The Peruvian Truth and Reconciliation Commission called for the creation of commemorative spaces in its 2003 report. In 2009 Germany offered Peru US$2 million to construct a memorial museum. President Alan García initially rejected this offer but ultimately accepted it, in the face of pressure from NGOs and political opponents, including Mario Vargas Llosa, then head of the museum planning committee.

Memory of the internal conflict remains contested in Peru. Willis writes that there are two main narratives of the conflict: "a state-military narrative which emphasises the role of 'terrorist' violence in promulgating the conflict, and a human rights narrative which is critical of both insurgent and state violence, while seeking to understand how structural racism shaped the conflict". LUM is associated with the human rights narrative, but the museum's planners sought to incorporate diverse viewpoints through a consultative process that involved surveys and sample audiences from various ideological communities.

=== 2023 closure and subsequent events ===
On 28 March 2023, on orders from the Miraflores municipal authorities, a group of inspectors arrived at LUM to conduct a technical visit. The inspectors met with representatives of the museum, asked to see the building safety technical inspection (ITSE) certificate, and set a deadline of 31 March for the presentation of observations. They returned later that afternoon and closed the museum. The mayor of Miraflores, Carlos Canales Anchorena of the conservative Popular Renewal party, claimed that the closure was because LUM did not have a Civil Defence certificate, which would be considered a serious fault in the event of an emergency. According to the Miraflores office of disaster risk management, the museum's ITSE certificate had expired in May 2016.

Amnesty International had been scheduled to present its 2022-2023 Annual Report on the global human rights situation at LUM at 6 pm that afternoon; following the closure, the event was moved to a hotel in Miraflores. The Ministry of Culture issued a bulletin indicating that LUM would reopen once the municipal authorities had issued their observations.

The website Ojo Público reported that a December 2021 report by the Comptroller General of Peru had shown that only three of the 56 museums managed by the Ministry of Culture had ITSE certificates; the Huaca Pucllana site museum, a major tourist attraction also located in Miraflores, was among those that did not.

The museum's closure was deemed a political act and triggered protests and statements from institutions such as the Office of the Public Defender, Amnesty International Peru, the National Coordination for Human Rights, the European Union and the government of Germany. Eduardo González Cueva, a Peruvian human rights consultant at the International Centre for Transitional Justice (ICTJ) in New York City, stated his belief that the move fitted into a broader trend of right-wing denialism of crimes committed by state forces in Latin America and a global push by radical conservatives to take control of cultural battles.

The museum was operating as of 2024.

In 2026, the Ministry of Culture cancelled a planned screening of the Palestinian film Revolutionaries Never Die at the museum, intended to close the Lima Alterna film festival.

== See also ==
- DIRCOTE Museum, in Lima District
- The Eye that Cries, a memorial to the victims of the conflict in central Lima
