= Efraín Morote Best =

Peruvian lawyer, anthropologist, and academic administrator

Rector of San Cristóbal of Huamanga University
- In office 1962–1968

Personal details
- Born: 8 July 1921 Ayacucho, Peru
- Died: 7 April 1989 (aged 67)
- Party: Shining Path
- Children: 3+, including Osmán

Efraín Morote Best (8 July 1921 – 7 April 1989) was a Peruvian lawyer, anthropologist, and academic administrator. From 1962 to 1968 he served as the Rector (i.e., chief administrator) of San Cristóbal of Huamanga University in Ayacucho, Perú. He and three of his children became members of Shining Path.

== Biography ==
Morote was born in Ayacucho into a wealthy and established family that owned land in Ayacucho, Abancay, and Cuzco, in southern Perú. During the 1940s and 1950s, he studied at various Peruvian universities and obtained degrees in literature, history, and law. Morote then became a specialist in the folklore of the Quechua-speaking native population of the Peruvian Andes and taught at the University of Cuzco. When the Peruvian government decided to reopen an old Catholic seminary in Ayacucho and make it into a modern university dedicated to improving the condition of the region's impoverished native population, Morote joined the new institution as professor of anthropology and vice-rector. The university began to operate in 1959. In 1962, Morote was chosen to succeed naval historian Fernando Romero Pintado as the university's leader.

Following a pattern which was not uncommon among Latin American intellectuals from upper and upper-middle-class backgrounds at the time, Morote embraced first religion (becoming the pastor of an evangelical Christian church) and later Communism. At the beginning of his tenure as rector, Morote recruited Abimael Guzmán as a professor of philosophy at the university. Guzmán went on to become the leader of a terrorist group, the Shining Path, which sought to bring about a pro-Communist uprising in Perú modeled after Mao Zedong's revolution in China. The Shining Path waged a 13-year-long conflict with both the Peruvian government and rival leftist militants. Osmán Morote Barrionuevo, one of Efraín Morote's sons, became the Shining Path's second-in-command. Efraín Morote's other two children also became members of the Shining Path.

Some observers, such as British writer Nicholas Shakespeare (who fictionalized the capture of Abimael Guzmán in his novel The Dancer Upstairs), have argued that Efraín Morote was probably the true intellectual leader of the Shining Path. Shakespeare described Abimael Guzmán as a man "absolutely without character" while he claimed that Morote was "incredibly intelligent and without emotion," a truly "evil" man.

Publicly, Morote remained until his death a respected social scientist of leftist political leanings.

== Works ==
- Elementos de folklore ("Elements of Folklore"), 1950
- Aldeas sumergidas ("Submerged Villages"), 1988
- Pueblo y universidad ("People and University"), 1990
