= Río Negro District =

Coordinates: 11.2091°S 74.6636°W

Río Negro
- District
- Interactive map of Río Negro
- Country: Peru
- Region: Junín
- Province: Satipo
- Founded: March 26, 1965
- Capital: Río Negro

Government
  - Mayor: José Edgar Zevallos Ramirez

Area
  - Total: 714.98 km^{2} (276.06 sq mi)
- Elevation: 650 m (2,130 ft)

Population (2005 census)
  - Total: 17,448
  - Density: 24.403/km^{2} (63.205/sq mi)
- Time zone: UTC-5 (PET)
- UBIGEO: 120607

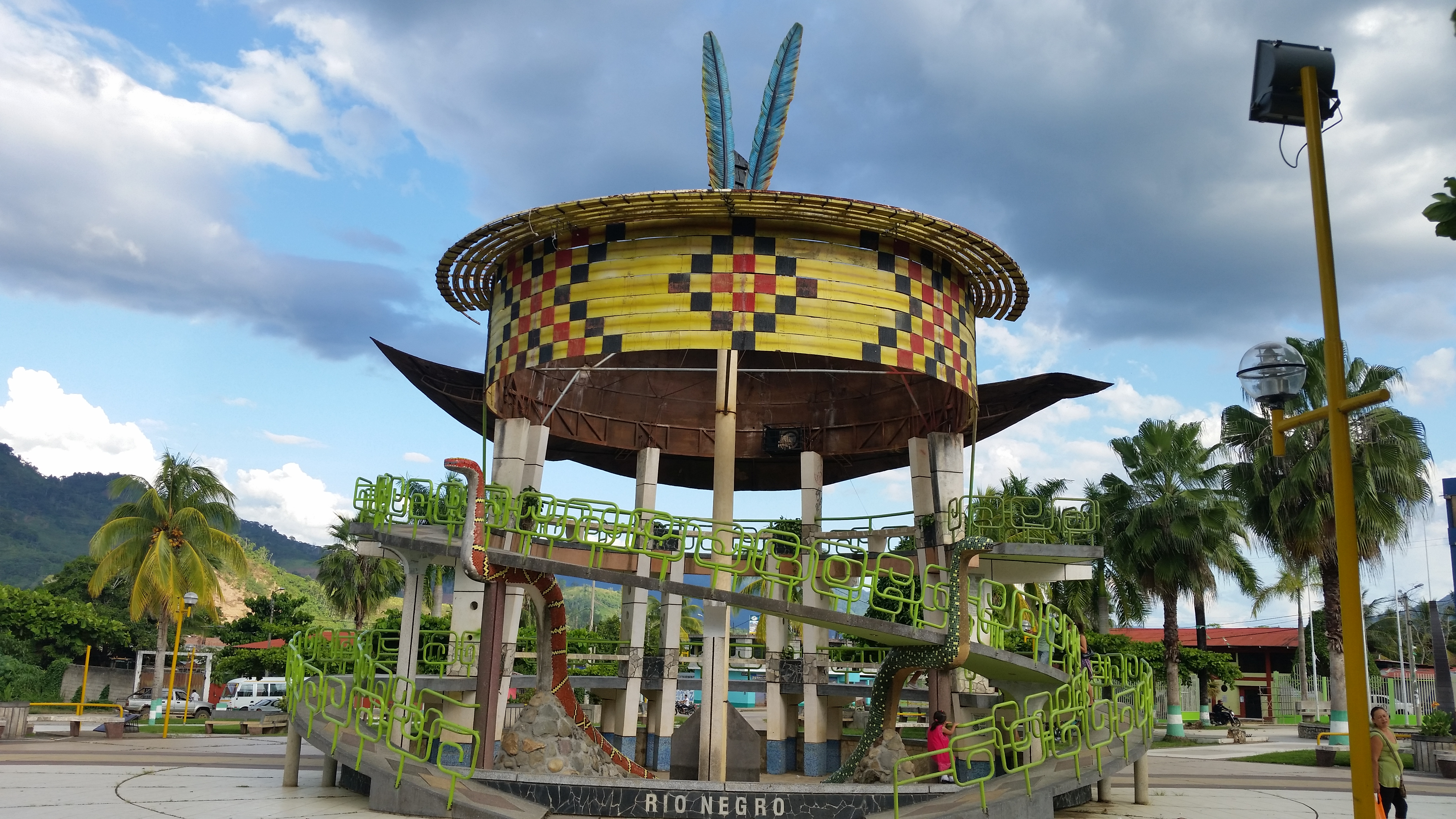

Río Negro District is one of eight districts of the province Satipo in Peru.

== Notable residents ==
- Luzmila Chiricente Mahuanca: Asháninka activist.
