= Capture of Abimael Guzmán =

1992 Peruvian military operation

Operation Victoria
- Part of the Internal conflict in Peru
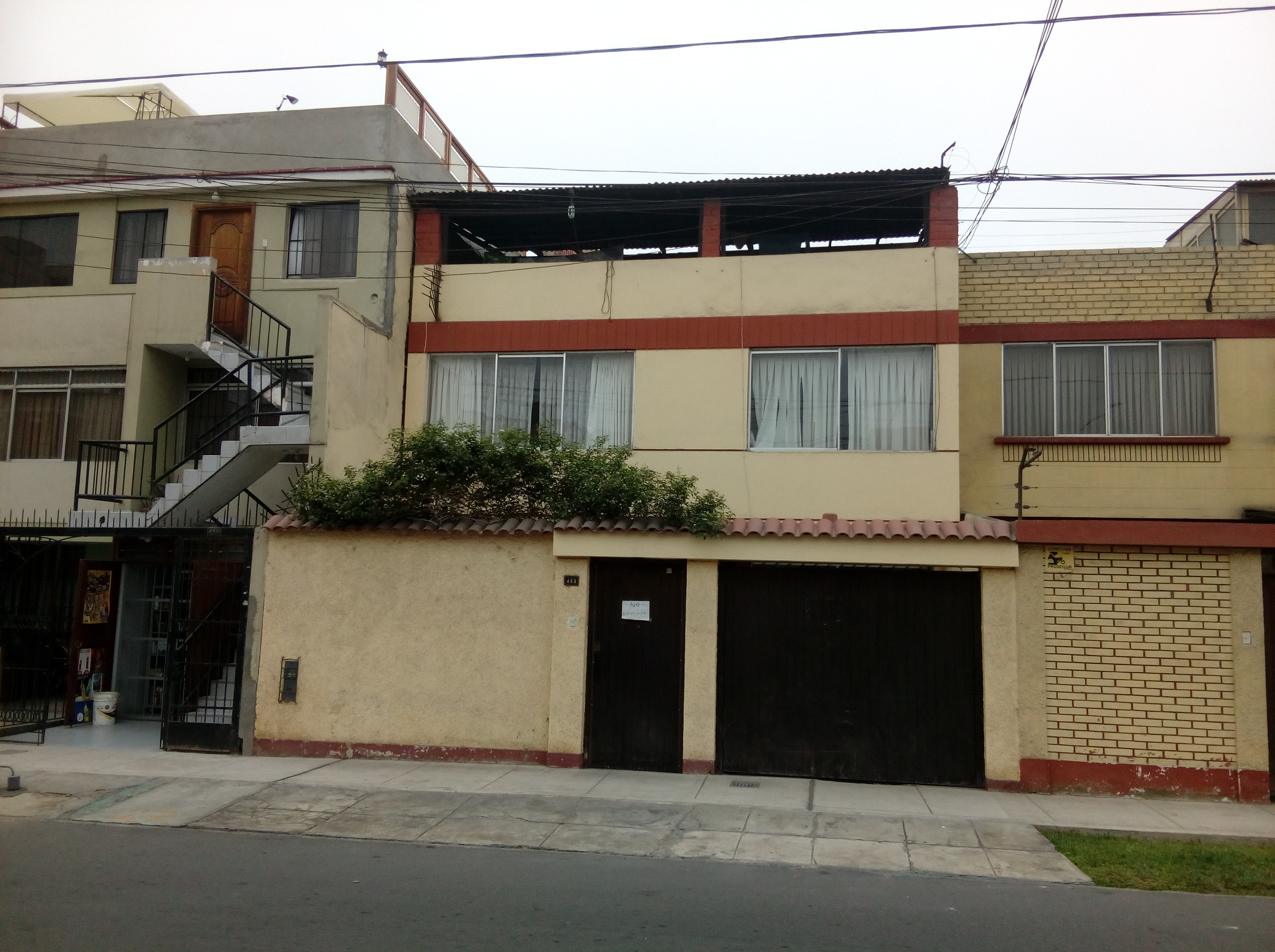
- House where Guzmán was captured
- Location: Varsovia 459, Surquillo, Lima, Peru
- Target: Abimael Guzmán
- Date: 12 September 1992; 20:45 (GMT -5)
- Executed by: (Peru) Special Intelligence Group
- Outcome: Government victory: Abimael Guzmán and other 4 senderistas captured; Start of the fall of the Shining Path

Operation Victoria, popularly known as "The Capture of the Century" (Spanish: La Captura del Siglo) or "The capture of Abimael Guzmán" (Spanish: La Captura de Abimael Guzmán), was an operation conducted by the Special Intelligence Group (GEIN) on September 12, 1992 in which the leader of the guerrilla group the Shining Path, Abimael Guzmán, was captured. This marked the beginning of the end of the Peruvian Internal Conflict.

== Development of the operation ==
=== "El castillo" ===
By July 25, GEIN agents managed to set up a surveillance post in front of the house suspected of being Abimael Guzmán's refuge. The house they set up was the home of a colonel of the now-defunct Peruvian Investigative Police (PIP), whom Jiménez asked for his collaboration, telling him that they were after an international gang linked to drug trafficking. The target house (where Guzmán was presumed to be) was designated as "El Castillo" while the area around "El Castillo" was designated as "Cancha 1". The area around the house of Germán Sipión Távara, alias "El Zorro" and national coordinator of Sendero Luminoso, was designated as "Cancha 2". The surveillance of Sipión's house, located in Balconcillo, was arranged so that said character could lead them to Guzmán's hiding place or some link that would lead them to Guzmán. For his part, the colonel of the house in front of "El Castillo" was a friend of Pablo Quinteros Tello, a friend of Montesinos and collaborator of the National Intelligence Service (SIN). The colonel told Quinteros about what Jiménez had told him, also asking him to intercede with Montesinos for the protection of his family. After a meeting at the SIN, the installation of a listening device was arranged, whose recordings were taken by the colonel to Quinteros and Quinteros transferred them to the SIN. Because previously the SIN and the GEIN had broken relations and the SIN had stopped financing them, through the listening devices, Montesinos collected information about what had happened and communicated it to Alberto Fujimori, who arranged that the operation carried out by the GEIN was not to be interfered with. Meanwhile, GEIN agents, in anticipation of other intelligence agencies interfering in their work, implemented their own security measures, including changing their nicknames, designating Jiménez as the "Chemist", Marco Miyashiro as the "Physicist" and Luis Valencia as the "Engineer" for Operation Victoria. Guzmán was given the nickname "Cachetón".

=== Monitoring and follow-up ===
In the first days of surveillance of "El Castillo", it was learned that the place gave dance classes under the direction of "Lola" (Maritza Garrido Lecca, partner of Carlos Incháustegui Degola, "Lolo"). From the follow-up to "Lolo", the GEIN agent, Elena Vadillo, noticed that "Lolo" bought 20 loaves of bread, keeping 15 in the backpack and carrying 5 in a paper bag. At the same time, while they were on a post to arrange the telephone interception, they noticed the presence of a brown-haired woman who hastily closed the window at the same time that the house did not have a telephone. Because the house did not have a telephone, the collection of garbage was arranged to obtain information. Carlos Andrés Iglesias and Rubén Zúñiga Carpio were assigned to do this task, realizing that the garbage was filtered. This measure taken by the Sendero members was due to the leak to the press of the details of the analysis of garbage during Operation Caballero. In response, Jiménez suggested continuing to wait for a mistake by the Sendero members. While surveillance of "El Castillo" continued, a paper thrown by "Lola" was recovered detailing a list of unusual medications for young couples ("Lola" and "Lolo"), which was taken as an indication of the presence of other people in the place. 26 days after the recovery of the list of medications, a manuscript was found in a garbage bag left by "Lola" that said: "Meeting of the BP (Buró Político). III Plenary Session of the CC. (Comité Central) C (Conquista) of power at national and international level. The scheme presented by the BP". The absence of a date on the manuscript did not allow GEIN agents to determine whether it was recent and whether it referred to members of the Sendero leadership who were alive at the time, since one of them, Hugo Deodato Juárez Cruzzat, had died during Operation Mudanza 1 and was expected to be replaced by Margie Clavo Peralta.

After days of surveillance (including renting a plane to take aerial photographs), on September 3, a clear photograph was taken of "Lola", who was identified by Miyashiro as Maritza Garrido Lecca. This was achieved because Garrido Lecca was photographed in 1987 during a DINCOTE operation at an MRTA printing press, and she was seen in cultural groups related to the MRTA, although on that occasion she was not found to have any relationship with subversive groups. Because the MRTA and the Sendero were at odds by then, the GEIN agents found it strange that a MRTA member was part of the Sendero circle. However, they concluded that this was possible due to Maritza Garrido Lecca's affiliation with Nelly Evans Risco, in charge of Guzmán's security and captured in Operation Caballero.

By September 5, "Lolo" was detected buying fish in quantities larger than two people. On September 6, "Lola" was discovered hanging men's clothing of a different size than "Lolo" wore, in addition to buying a dark shirt of a larger size. On September 8, after a power outage due to a terrorist attack, GEIN agents discovered, by the light of a candle in "El Castillo", the silhouette of a man who resembled the Guzmán shown in the video of Zorba, the Greek. On September 10, they convinced a man who was handing out electricity bills to let them hand them out instead. The agent in charge of the action had the order to knock on the door several times to see the reactions inside the house. After a few moments, an older woman dressed in dark clothing appeared, which confirmed that there were other people in the place so they prepared to enter the property. At the same time, "El zorro", who was being monitored, became increasingly nervous.

== The capture ==
=== The House of Balconcillo ===
At 4 pm, they left for Balconcillo with the keys found among the belongings of "El Zorro". After entering, they found a television broadcasting the football match and two young men. In another room they found a woman with headphones. When they asked their names, one of them said he was José Palomino Sánchez, but was identified as Marciano Valerio Gonzáles Toribio, alias "Camarada Enrique". The others were identified as Miguel Ángel Villalobos Villanueva and Carmen Ruiz Nano. Among the belongings were found various packages ready to be sent to the regional committees of Sendero Luminoso, as well as a submachine gun and two revolvers that were going to be sent to Trujillo. The agents recorded what was seized. While this was going on, a CIA agent nicknamed "Superman" appeared at "La Fortaleza" because he had heard on the GEIN agents' radio communications that something was going on and he wanted to get first-hand information since Guzmán was also considered an enemy of the United States. After the arrival of "Superman" Vidal made his appearance. Vidal arrived when Jiménez and his people were watching the recording of what was seized in Balconcillo. Vidal asked angrily about who had given the order to start without his knowledge, to which Jiménez replied that "I have made the decision to strike and I answer in the end for my actions, now I require tranquility to think about the next step." Vidal withdrew threatening Jiménez. In addition to this, Vidal did not inform the higher command about the operation since he preferred to keep the secret to avoid it being leaked, relying on what he learned in the KGB.

=== Intervention in "El Castillo" ===
External videos
- Captura de Abimael Guzmán- LUM on YouTube

At 5:30 p.m., GEIN agents saw a couple (Patricia Awapara and Celso Garrido Lecca) arrive 43 who knocked on the door of "El Castillo". They waited until "Lola" opened the door, greeted the couple and let them in. After this, Miyashiro began to coordinate with the other agents and it was established that once the couple left the house they would intervene. Miyashiro ordered a couple of agents to go to a nearby warehouse to buy beer and pretend to be drinking like friends. Those in charge of this action were Julio Becerra and Cecilia Garzón, "Ardilla" and "Gaviota", who were also a couple. Because the warehouse did not sell alcoholic beverages, they bought a Coca Cola and a bag of corn flakes. After an hour, and because the couple from "El Castillo" had not yet left, Miyashiro left and went to buy a pack of cigarettes. He gestured to "Ardilla" about the presence of a wall that they could climb, but that possibility was ruled out.

At 8 pm, the door of the house was heard to open. "Ardilla" and "Gaviota", with their revolvers, went to "El Castillo" and proceeded to intervene with "Lola" and "Lolo", who began to scream and launched themselves against "Ardilla", which caused "Gaviota" to shoot in the air. At this, "Lola" and "Lolo" became frightened and "Ardilla" subdued them and entered "El Castillo". After going up to the second floor, he found a plywood partition and a woman (Elena Iparraguirre) who ran inside. "Ardilla" pushed the plywood, entered and found "Cachetón", Abimael Guzmán. He then pointed at him and said: "¡Soy de la policía! ¡Si tú te mueves, te mato, carajo! [I'm with the police! If you move, I'll kill you, dammit!]" Guzmán replied: "Tranquilo muchacho, ya perdí [Easy, kid, I already lost]".

=== Shining Path members captured ===
- 1. Abimael Guzmán (leader of Shining Path)
- 2. Eliana Iparraguirre
- 3. Mariana Pantoja
- 4. Laura Zambrano
- 5. Maritza Guarrido Lecca

== Aftermath ==
The house where Guzmán was captured was located at Calle 1 (later Varsovia Street) number 459, a residential street in Los Sauces, a neighbourhood of Surquillo. It remained untouched following the operation, continuing to function as a private residence, as well as a local landmark. It would be eventually purchased by a real-estate agency in 2023 and demolished to make way for a ten-storey residential building.

== See also ==
- Manhunt (military)
- Death of Pablo Escobar
- Capture of Saddam Hussein
- Capture of Manuel Noriega

=== Media portrayal ===
- The Last Hour (2017)
