= Maritza Garrido Lecca =

Peruvian terrorist

- Known for: Hiding Abimael Guzmán
- Penalty: 25 years in prison

Peruvian dancer Maritza Garrido Lecca was sentenced in 1992 to 25 years in prison for hiding Abimael Guzmán, the terrorist leader of the Maoist group Shining Path.

This 27-year-old classical dancer, from a wealthy family, became involved with the Maoist terrorist group and sheltered its leader due to her radical ideology.

Garrido Lecca allegedly came into contact with the Shining Path through her aunt, Nelly Marión Evans Risco, a former nun who had been recruited by the terrorist group while teaching at a school in Lima.

Evans was arrested in 1991. Maritza Garrido Lecca was released in 2017 after completing her 25-year prison sentence.
