= Lika Mutal =

Dutch-Peruvian sculptor

- Born: 12 September 1939
- Died: 7 November 2016 (aged 77)
- Education: Bonifacius College, Utrecht, The Netherlands Art and Drama Studies, Utrecht and Amsterdam, the Netherlands School of Fine Arts, Universidad de los Andes, Bogota, Colombia School of Fine Arts, Universidad Catolica, Lima, Peru.
- Awards: 2007 Jose Maria Arguedas Prize for El ojo que Llora, Lima 1994 Royal Ueno Museum Prize, Fujisankei Biennale, Japan 1992 Excellent Maquette, Fujisankei Biennale, Japan 1987 Premio Camacho, Lima, Peru 1970 First Sculpture Prize, Universidad Catolica, Lima, Peru
- Scientific career
- Fields: Sculpture

Lika Mutal (12 September 1939 – 7 November 2016) was a Dutch-Peruvian sculptor whose career began in 1971. Mutal is well known for her hand carved stonework, which focuses on the interconnectedness of the human and non-human world. The idea of duality is an omnipresent theme in Mutal’s life, as she is of European heritage, but she lives part-time in the ancient landscape of Lima, Peru and part-time in the modern architecture of New York City. Duality manifests in her work as she juxtaposes rough, jagged edges with smooth, polished surfaces, as well as with the physical structure of the work, which has each of the pieces typically as some element that links two independent pieces. Most impressive about her work- is Mutal’s ability to give a sort of dynamism to the inherently static substance of stone. Mutal’s work is well represented globally, and her practice is based out of Norha Haime Gallery in New York City.

== Early life and education ==
Lika Mutal was born in the Netherlands in 1939. Her mother was an accomplished pianist and singer, and her father was an oil painter. Mutal was the third child of twelve, and the first girl born in the family. Though her father influenced her love for the arts, Mutal never learned the visual arts, and in fact, she found her father's black and white paintings boring. From a young age, Mutal wished to become an actress. She acted in the cabaret in the Netherlands, and attended Bonifacius College in Utrecht. As she became more skilled, she sought out the traditional theatre school. However, she never attended because she had met the man who would later become her husband.

In 1962, Lika married Silvio Mutal. Soon after, in 1964, the two moved to Colombia for Silvio’s job. Mutal fell in love with Colombia instantly, and found herself intrigued by the effect that the landscape, which was so different from the flat and grey cityscape of the Netherlands, had on the human consciousness. Because of the language barrier, Mutal’s acting dream was put on hold, so she began to puppeteer in order to continue performing. She handmade each of her puppets, which ultimately led her to pursue sculpture as a career. Her puppets began as representational figures that she used to portray her political opinions, but over time became increasingly abstract until they could hardly be considered puppets anymore, but instead small sculptures.

Lika Mutal studied at the Universidad de los Andes in Bogota, Colombia for a short time until she moved with her husband and two children to Lima, Peru in 1968. Mutal was mystified by the untouched landscape of Peru juxtaposed with a growing interest in modern architecture. While in Lima, she began studying at the Universidad Catolica. At the University, she studied under Anna Maccagno, who taught her to work with traditional materials such as clay, wood, and steel. In 1971, Mutal was introduced to a well-known stone smith, Don Juan Arias, who would soon become her greatest influence. Beyond the technicality of the classroom, Arias taught Mutal the importance of developing an intimate relationship with stone, as if it had a soul. He showed her healing qualities found in stone; if one takes the time to notice, the very same qualities that are dangerous if not careful. Halfway through the degree at the Universidad Catolica, Mutal quit in order to work on her own, and no evidence points to her ever returning. While still a novice to stonework, Mutal was very cautious of outside artistic influences, and resisted visiting the ancient Incan stonework located in Cuzco, Peru as she feared she may never want to work with stone again. In 1978, she visited Cuzco for the first time. Here she saw that Pre-Columbian art was created to serve a purpose, rather than to be beautiful.

== Career and work ==
After quitting university, Mutal rented a small studio in Barranco, Lima. That same year, she had her first small art show. Two years later, after building her portfolio and collection of work, Mutal was noticed by the Galerie D’Eendt, in Amsterdam. This show was the tipping point of her career that gained her a great deal of global admiration and led to her next show at the Galerie Daniel Gervis in Paris, France.

In 1983, Lika Mutal was invited to become part of the Nahra Haime Gallery in New York. This relationship has continued to the present and has influenced Mutal to take residence in New York City, as well as Peru.

Lika Mutal’s work is heavily inspired by her intimate relationship with the landscape and with the spirit of the stone. It is these relationships that make her work so unique. From the process of choosing a stone to the finished product, Mutal’s goal is to magnify the individual life in the stone so that it may be seen or experienced by the untrained eye. In order to do this, Mutal adopted a unique standard protocol for her artistic development. She begins by visiting a quarry in order to choose the perfect stone. Mutal is not in search of any specific qualities; she just looks for a stone to stand out to her as an individual. She then studies it physically for some time, leaves, and if she can return to exactly the same stone multiple times days later, she takes the stone to her studio. Before removing the stone, Mutal performs rituals taught to her by Incan shamans, which include burnt offerings and sprinkling the ground with wine, asking the Earth for permission. After the stone is in her studio, she spends time analyzing it for its external and internal properties. It is for this reason that she is known for living a stone untouched in her studio for years before she actually makes the first mark. When she finally begins manipulating the stone, she focuses on enhancing rather than altering, and is careful to avoid imposing her human will onto the stone. It is this enhanced awareness of the stone and the intricacy of which she works, that forces her to work by hand rather than with stone-cutting machinery.

In addition to being influenced by Mutal’s personal relationship with the stone, some work is inspired by the quipus, a pre-Columbian tool used for recording and mathematics, which has never been deciphered. This simple, inherent mystery revolving the quipus inspired much of Mutal’s early, smaller-scale work, which has been praised for having a fibrous fluidity. In addition to the Quipus series, Mutal explored the dual theme of independent interconnectedness through her Ones series. This series speaks to the interconnectedness between human life and nature by linking two horizontal beams in such a way that they could still move independently. This work is especially inspired by Peru’s unique landscape. One aspect of the Peruvian landscape that inspires Mutal is the unexpected duality found in “the confrontation with life and death; beautiful beaches, but carcasses of animals on the beach… at first big and empty, but then charged with subtle energy. Driving on the tiny ribbon that is the road, on one hand, the ocean and the desert, and on the other, the strong presence of many colored mountains.” The concept of independent-interconnectedness in Lika Mutal’s work evolved through the series of work referred to as the Labyrinths. The Labyrinths are more architectural than the previous work, which is directly correlated with living part-time in New York City, and they serve as the point in her career at which she began to work on a larger scale, in order to connect her entire body with her practice. In addition to transitioning to large-scale work, Lika Mutal also began the transition into working with granite.

== Awards and honours ==
Lika Mutal has recently been awarded the Jose Maria Arguedas Prize for her work El ojo que Llora. This work is located on permanent display in Campo de Marte, in Lima, Peru. Mutal was commissioned to make a piece of public art in order to commemorate the loss of life as a result of a dispute between the Peruvian government and guerrilla that took place from 1980 to 2000. The memorial consists of one large stone, in the centre of a spiralling path of over 60,000 small stones. The centre stone is a representation of the Pachamama, an Incan Earth Mother goddess. Embedded in the surface is a smaller stone, meant to represent an eye. The large stone also has a water element that constantly trickles water from the eye as if crying. Each of the smaller encircling stones is engraved with the name of an individual who fell victim to the violence. This memorial caused controversy amongst the population over what names what constitutes a victim and who should be memorialize because included in the 60,000 stones were the aggressors who caused the violence.

Lika Mutal has also been awarded the Royal Ueno Museum Prize in 1994, and an Excellent Maquette Prize in 1992, from the Fujisankei Biennale, founded in Japan, as well as the First Sculpture Prize from the Universidad Catolica in 1970.
