= Augusta La Torre =

Peruvian revolutionary (1946–1988)

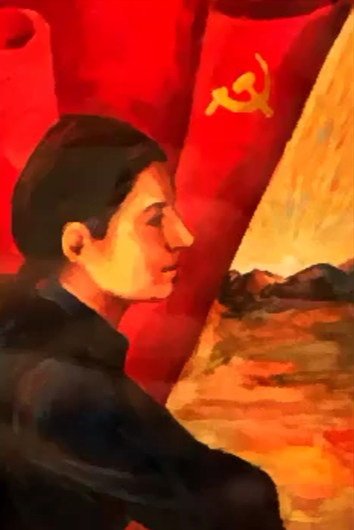
- Portrait of Augusta La Torre

Personal details
- Born: 29 August 1946 Huanta, Ayacucho, Peru
- Died: 14 November 1988 (aged 42) Peru
- Party: Shining Path
- Spouse: Abimael Guzmán (m. 1964)

Augusta Deyanira La Torre Carrasco (Note: Spanish pronunciation: [auˌɡusta deʝaˌniɾa la ˌtore kaˈrasko];)(29 August 1946 – 14 November 1988), also known as Comrade Norah, (Note: Spanish: Camarada Norah; Spanish pronunciation: [kamaˌɾada ˈnoɾa])) was a Peruvian communist, recognized as the number two in command of the guerrilla group Shining Path. La Torre's influence on her husband, Shining Path founder Abimael Guzmán, is credited with establishing equality for women with regard to participation within the revolutionary organization, and during its militant actions.

== Biography ==
La Torre was born in Huanta in 1946 into a land-owning family with a prominent political lineage, later leaving to study in Ayacucho as a teenager. The daughter of Communist party leader Carlos La Torre Córdova and Delia Carrasco, "she grew up in a family where political activity, party membership and protest against the Peruvian state were routine, making it unsurprising that she too entered radical politics."

She joined the Peruvian Communist Party in 1962 at the age of 17. She met Abimael Guzmán, a professor of philosophy, through her parents. Guzmán was a regular guest to their home in Ayacucho, meeting with La Torre's father to discuss politics. On 3 February 1964, she married Guzmán. La Torre also encouraged Guzmán to establish the Popular Women's Movement in Ayacucho in 1965. She was active within the Maoist political organization, Bandera Roja (Red Flag), and helped found the People's Aid of Peru.

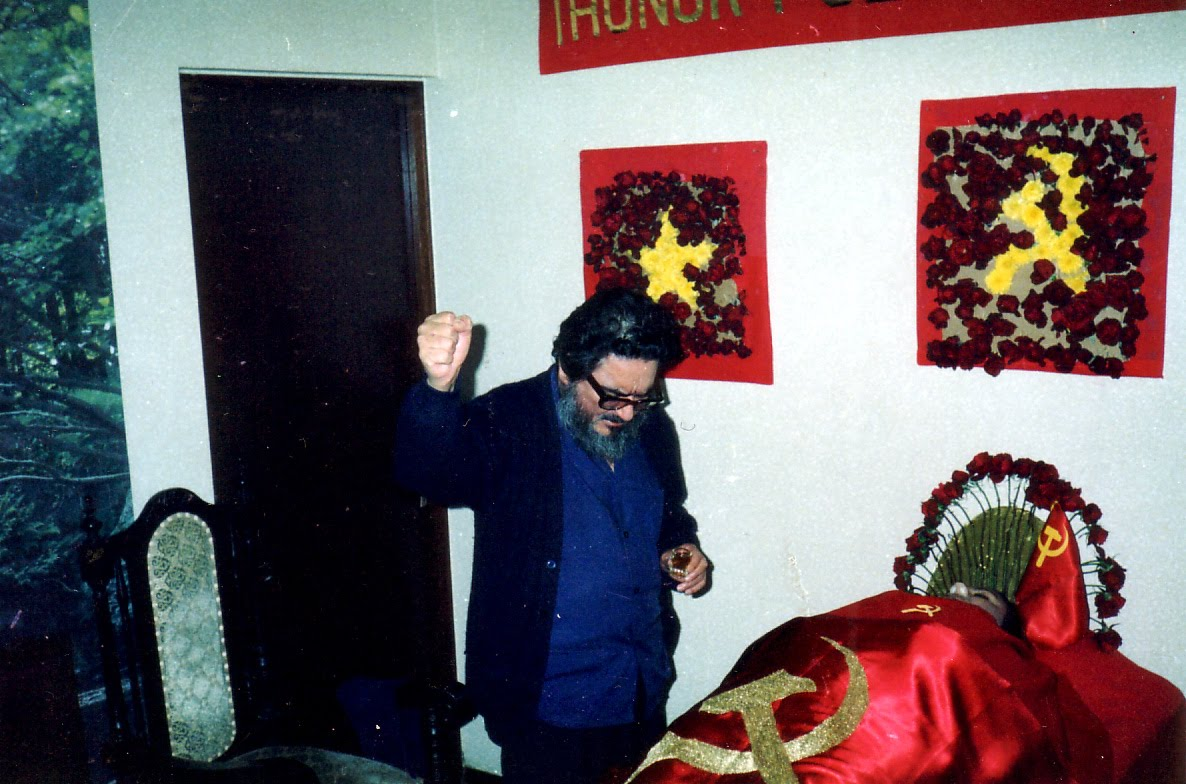
Abimael Guzmán with his fist raised during La Torre's funeral.

La Torre was instrumental in helping Guzmán to create the Shining Path (known in Spanish as the Sendero Luminoso). On 24 December 1980, the beginning of the "armed struggle" (Inicio de la Lucha Armada), she led one of the first attacks of the Shining Path, which targeted a small farm, Hacienda San Agustín de Ayzarca, and culminated in the torture and murder of the farm manager, Benigno Medina and a 19 year old worker named Ricardo Lizarbe.

She went into hiding with Guzmán in 1978 and died in November 1988, although the circumstances of her death remain unclear. La Torre was succeeded as the group's number two by Elena Yparraguirre, who married Guzmán in 2010 after La Torre was declared legally dead.

In 2021, Peruvian journalist Umberto Jara claimed that, according to evidence that included a police document with testimonies and a 400-page manuscript written by Guzmán after his 1992 capture, La Torre was assassinated on Guzmán's orders due to alleged disagreements with him and the risk of a schism, and that Guzmán had reportedly ordered that her remains never be found, while publicly stating that her cause of death was a suicide.

== See also ==
- Women in the Shining Path
