= Mutal, Republic of Bashkortostan =

Mutal Мутал
- Village
- Location within Bashkortostan Location within Russia
- Coordinates: 52°44′N 55°34′E
- Country: Russia
- Region: Bashkortostan
- District: Kuyurgazinsky District
- Time zone: UTC+5:00

Mutal (Russian: Мутал; Bashkir: Мотал, Motal) is a rural locality (a village) in Shabagishsky Selsoviet, Kuyurgazinsky District, Bashkortostan, Russia. The population was 4 as of 2010. There is one street.

== Geography ==
Mutal is located 22 km northwest of Yermolayevo (the district's administrative centre) by road. Kholodny Klyuch is the nearest rural locality.
