= DIRCOTE =

Directorate of the National Police of Peru |Dircote

Dirección contra el terrorismo ("Counter-Terrorist Directorate")
- DIRCOTE Seal

Agency overview
- Preceding agency: DINCOTE
- Jurisdiction: National
- Headquarters: Lima, Peru
- Agency executives: Max Orlando Anhuamán Centeno
- Parent agency: National Police of Peru
- Child agency: GEIN (1990–1993)

The Counter-Terrorist Directorate (Spanish: Dirección contra el terrorismo, known as DIRCOTE) is the counterterrorism branch of the National Police of Peru (PNP) that is responsible for Peru's tactical counterterrorism law enforcement.

The Special Intelligence Group (GEIN), a former unit of DIRCOTE, is known for having carried out the capture of the Shining Path leader Abimael Guzmán on September 12, 1992. For this and other achievements, the group's former members were declared "Heroes of Democracy" by Peru's Congress in 2017.

== See also ==
- DIRCOTE Museum
