= San Cristóbal of Huamanga University =

University in the city of Ayacucho in southern Peru

National University of San Cristóbal de Huamanga
- Universidad Nacional de San Cristóbal de Huamanga
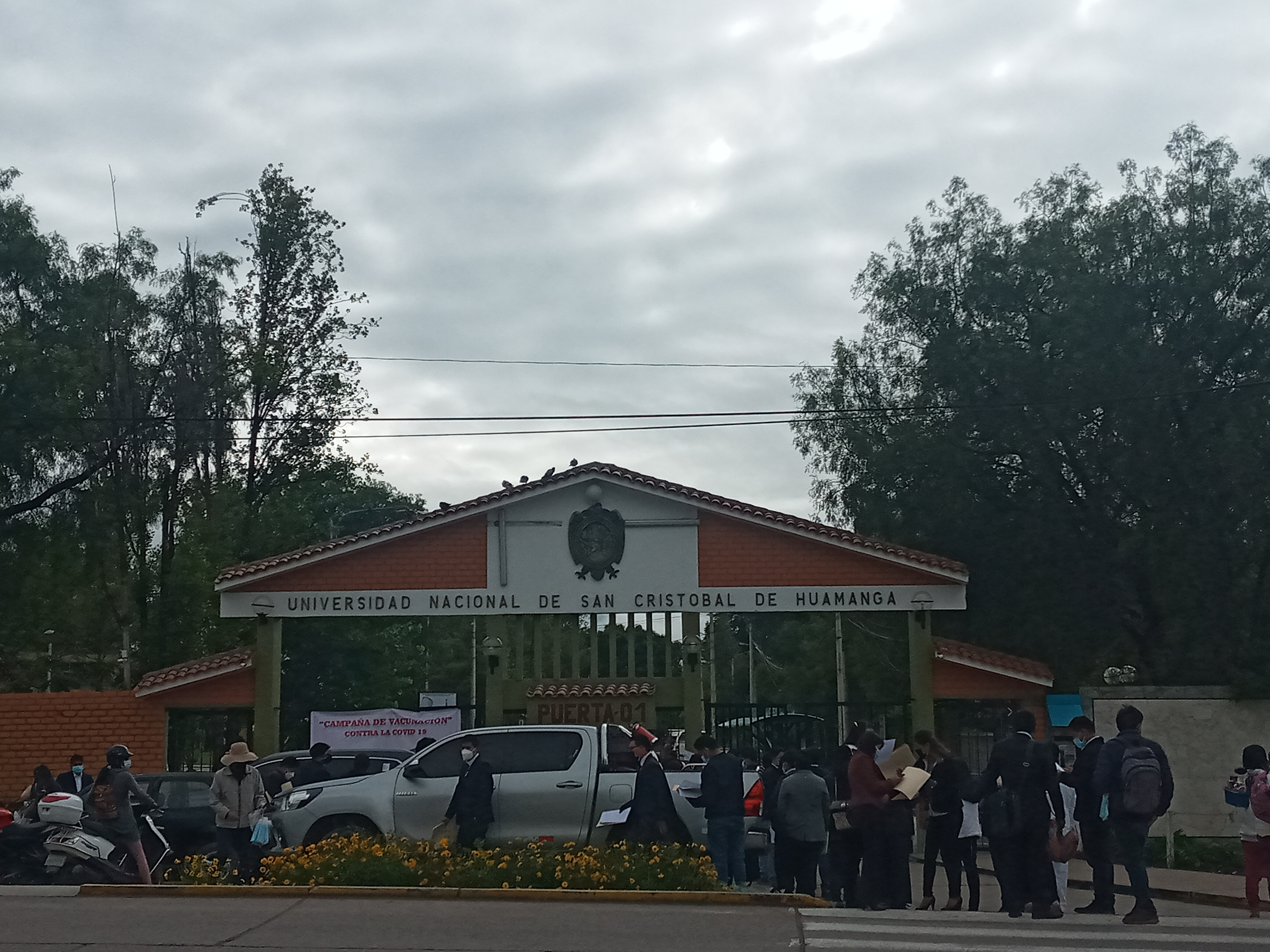
- Other name: UNSCH
- Motto: Primum Vivere, Deinde Philosophare
- Motto in English: First Live, then Philosophize
- Type: Public
- Established: July 3, 1677 (349 years ago)
- Founder: Cristóbal de Castilla y Zamora
- Rector: Dr. Homero Ango Aguilar
- Students: 8,984 (2010)
- Location: Portal Independencia Nº 57, Ayacucho, Peru; 13.148°S 74.22°W
- Campus: Urban
- Colors: Gray
- Mascot: Eagle
- Website: www.unsch.edu.pe

The National University of San Cristóbal de Huamanga (Spanish: Universidad Nacional de San Cristóbal de Huamanga) is a public university located in the city of Ayacucho (formerly known as Huamanga) in southern Peru.

== History ==
The university was established in 1677 by Cristóbal de Castilla y Zamora, the Catholic archbishop of La Plata o Charcas. Until it was closed in the mid-19th century, it operated mostly as a seminary for the training of Catholic priests. The government of Perú reopened it in 1959 as a national university.

In the 1960s, the university became a breeding ground for communist organizations, including the Shining Path. This group, led by philosophy professor Abimael Guzmán, started there before growing into a violent guerrilla movement that conducted a bloody campaign against the government of Perú and against rival leftists groups.

The rector of the university is Homero Ango Aguilar, a biologist.

== See also ==
- List of colonial universities in Latin America
- Efraín Morote Best
