= Truth and Reconciliation Commission (Peru) =

Human rights commission (2001–2003)

- Comisión de la Verdad y Reconciliación
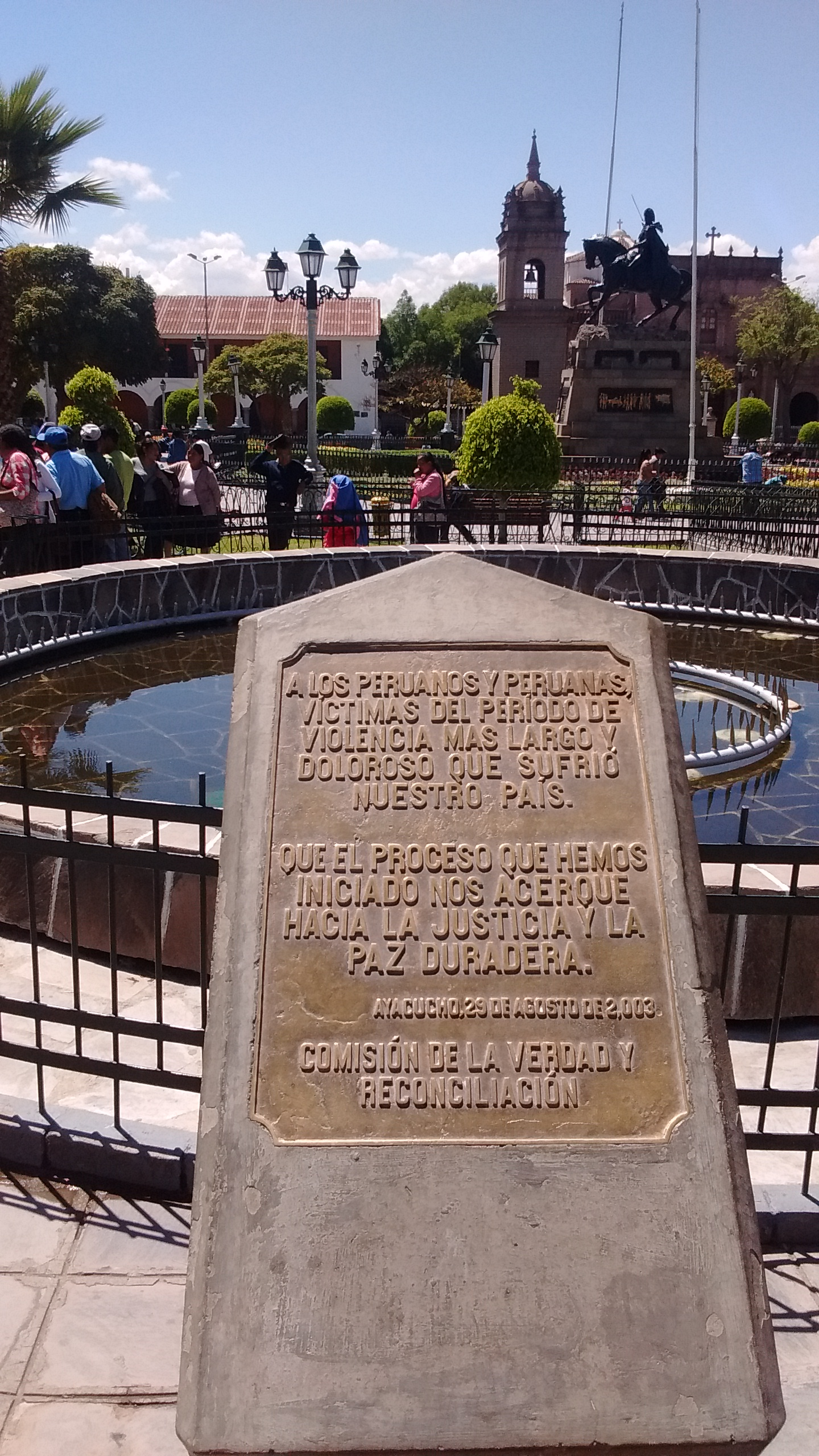
- Website: cverdad.org.pe

Peru's Truth and Reconciliation Commission (TRC; Spanish: Comisión de la Verdad y Reconciliación, CVR) (13 July 2001 – 28 August 2003) was a truth and reconciliation commission established by President Alejandro Toledo to investigate the human rights abuses committed during the internal conflict in Peru between the 1980s and 1990s. The TRC was a response to the violent internal conflict between 1980 and 2000 during the administration of Presidents Fernando Belaúnde (1980–1985), Alan García (1985–1990), and Alberto Fujimori (1990–2000). The commission's mandate was to provide a record of human rights and international humanitarian law violations committed in Peru between May 1980 and November 2000, as well as recommend mechanisms to promote and strengthen human rights. The TRC reported on the estimated 70 000 deaths, assassinations, torture, disappearances, displacement, employment of terrorist methods and other human rights violations executed by the State, Shining Path, and the Túpac Amaru Revolutionary Movement. The report concluded that there is both institutional and individual accountability, as well as identifying racial and cultural factors that became a catalyst for conflict.

A 2019 study disputed the casualty figures from the Truth and Reconciliation Commission, estimating instead "a total of 48,000 killings, substantially lower than the TRC estimate" and concluding that "the Peruvian State accounts for a significantly larger share than the Shining Path." The TRC later came out to respond to these statements, defending his methodology and results.

== Background ==
Between 1980 and 2000, Peru experienced an era of political violence characterized by extensive human rights violations. Several regimes of military dictatorship resulted in political and economic instability that increased social tensions within Peru. The internal conflict in Peru was ignited by the 1980 Presidential election that led to guerrilla warfare by several political revolutionary groups. The internal armed conflict resulted in the deaths of approximately 70 000 people and the internal displacement of 600 000 people, as well as extensive damage to both public and private infrastructures. Both state and non-state actors carried out assassinations, kidnapping, forced disappearance, tortures, unfair detentions, serious crimes and other human rights violations. Although rebel groups remain lightly active, the government ended its engagement in the conflict after President Alberto Fujimori was forced to resign in 2000.

=== Shining Path ===
Flag of the Shining Path Revolutionary Group

The Shining Path (Sendero Luminoso) is one of the major Peruvian rebel groups involved in the internal conflict of Peru and was found to be largely responsible for the human rights violations during the 1980s and 1990s. The revolutionary group was organized as a Maoist political group in 1970 after the dissolution of the Communist Party of Peru. The Shining Path employed guerrilla tactics and violent acts of terrorism in an attempt to overthrow the government. The Shining Path ignited the internal conflict in 1980 when it began its revolutionary campaign with its first act of violence in Chuschi, Ayacucho by storming the polling station and burning the ballot boxes on the eve of the first national elections in approximately 10 years. The majority of the acts of violence by the Shining Path were carried out in the Ayacucho region of Peru, where many indigenous populations live in extreme poverty. The group established a presence throughout the country, but mainly operated out of the rural highlands with limited government presence. Their campaign consisted of bombings, assassinations, public executions and other guerrilla attacks against the state.

=== Túpac Amaru Revolutionary Movement ===
Flag of the Túpac Amaru Revolutionary Movement

The Túpac Amaru Revolutionary Movement (Movimiento Revolucionario Túpac Amaru) is a Marxist–Leninist revolutionary group formed in 1982 from the influence of Revolutionary Left Movement of the 1960s and the Revolutionary Socialist Party. The revolutionary group was found to be responsible for a significant number of deaths and displacements during the internal conflict, as well as engaged in guerrilla warfare against the military and the Shining Path. The group intended to overthrow the military government and establish a Marxist regime to eliminate Japanese and U.S. imperialism from Peru. Their campaign officially began on 1 June 1984 by broadcasting their first communiqué with a declaration of intent to reform the Peruvian Government through an occupation radio broadcasts systems. The activities of the revolutionary group consisted of bombings, kidnappings, bank robberies, extortion, ambushes, and assassinations, as well as being responsible for several anti-United States attacks. The Túpac Amaru is considered to be a lesser violent rebel group because its guerrilla operations were "designed to support the mass struggle" against the authoritarian governments.

=== Fernando Belaúnde ===
Fernando Belaúnde Terry served as President of Peru from 1963 to 1968 and again from 1980 to 1985. Belaúnde was part of the Popular Action (Acción Popular) political party, a centre-right party known for its pro-American position. Economic instability persisted under the Belaúnde administration, experiencing large foreign debt, budget deficits, high inflation rates, costly natural disasters, and weak markets for Peru's exports, causing the government to impose austerity measures for economic development. The internal conflict began as a result of the democratic elections of 1980, with both the Túpac Amaru Revolutionary Movement and the Shining Path implementing a terrorist campaign against the government. The government attempted to suppress the rebel groups through police and armed force operations, resulting in deaths and disappearances beginning to escalate. Human rights groups denounced the widespread abuse of innocent citizens during the struggle against the rebel groups.

=== Alan García ===
Alan García Pérez served as President of Peru from 1985 to 1990 and again from 2006 to 2011. García was part of the American Popular Revolutionary Alliance (APRA), a centre-left political party. The García Administration inherited the economic and political instability of its predecessor. The government implemented an austerity program as an effort against the Shining Path, but resulted in an economic crisis. Peru's economy suffered a hyperinflation of 7500% during García's presidency, worsening national poverty rates. Conflict between the government and rebel groups escalated to a 'dirty war', in which atrocities were committed by both the rebels and military forces. The armed groups deliberately targeted civilians and government forces responded with execution of suspects, forced disappearances, and unlawful detention. The most notable human rights abuse performed by García's government was the Accomarca massacre of 1985, where more than forty-five civilians were tortured and killed in an attempt to discover the names of members of Shining Path.

=== Alberto Fujimori ===
Alberto Fujimori served as President of Peru from 1990 to 2000 and was known for his corruption and crimes against humanity under international law. He was head of the Cambio 90 political party, a new right-wing party. Fujimori carried out neo-liberal policies and implemented an austerity policy, known as Fujishock, to eliminate inflation but increase poverty. The failure of the policy led to a military supported autogolpe (self-coup), declaring a state of emergency, dissolving Congress, and calling for a new constitution, in which Fujimori ran unopposed. Fujimori increased the government's influence over military operations, using it as primary means against the rebel groups. The government implemented an anti-insurgency campaign, including arming villagers and conducting secretive military trials of suspected members of rebel groups. Fujimori was responsible for the Barrios Altos massacre, where six members of the Peruvian armed forces executed 15 people allegedly involved with the Shining Path, including one child, and left five injured. Corruption within the government further developed under Fujimori, as he used the secret police to infiltrate opposing political parties, bribed legislators and electoral officials, censored the media, embezzled and redirected government funds, as well as carrying out human rights abuses, such as illegal arrests and torture.

== Mandate ==
In December 2000, interim President Valentín Paniagua approved the establishment of a truth and reconciliation commission, which was ratified by President-elect Alejandro Toledo in 2001. The commission was created to investigate a wide variety of human rights abuses, including assassinations, torture, disappearances, displacement, employment of terrorist methods and other violations executed by the state and rebel groups between May 1980 and November 2000. The mandate was to analyze the causes of violence that had occurred, determine the scale of victimization, assess responsibility, and propose reparations and recommendations. The degree of the mandate comprised an open list of acts of crime, allowing the commission to include all crimes deemed relevant. The primary purpose of the commission was to establish the truth about crimes and events, providing a historical explanation by determining individual and group culpability for crimes and abuses. Despite the main purpose of exposing the truth, it was important to restore personal dignity, as victims became stigmatized by the public or local communities who assumed they were associated with rebel groups. The TRC organized its work into specialized units to conduct research in specific areas.

=== Objectives ===
The TRC described 5 main objectives:

1. Analyze the political, social and cultural conditions and behaviors that contributed to the violent conflicts in both State and societal context.
2. Contribute to the administration of justice, and to clarify the crimes and violations to human rights committed by both terrorist organizations and the State.
3. Determine the situation and identification of the victim, as well corresponding responsibilities when possible.
4. Make moral and material proposals for victims or their relatives.
5. Recommend necessary reforms for preventive measures to ensure no experiences are repeated.

=== Areas of work ===
==== National process of political violence ====
The purpose of the area of study was to analyze political, social and cultural conditions that contributed to the situation of violence in Peru, including societal and state institutions as contributing factors. Violence influenced social, economic and political conditions of society, therefore the unit was devoted to the impact of national violence. The analysis presented to the TRC focused on national level research and a historical interpretation of political violence.

==== Clarification of facts ====
To clarify historical events, research was conducted to reconstruct the explanations of crimes and human rights violations. The tasks of the unit was to investigate specific cases of local experiences. Testimonies of crimes and human rights violations were registered to provide in-depth studies of communities affected by the internal conflict.

==== Consequences, reparations and reconciliation ====
The unit's objective was to determine the effects of political violence in various areas of Peru and on the lives of people living in those areas, group identified victims of political violence and ensure that victims were dignified in the process. From the conclusions, the group developed proposals for mechanisms that ensure reparation, prevention and reconciliation.

==== Communications and education ====
The unit designed and constructed social communication programs, citizen participation and education. The group proposed several platforms, including mass and broadcast campaigns, seminars and forums, cultural and artistic activities, and volunteer programs.

==== Public hearings ====
Public hearings were a mechanism to gather information of atrocities and relay it to the public. Peru was the first Latin American TRC to hold public hearings, a method popularized by the South African TRC. The TRC held hearings with testimonies that the commissioners heard directly, as well as being open to the public and broadcast on radio and television. The objectives of public hearings were to incorporate the personal truth of the victims into the commission and convert the information into an instructional instrument, while recognizing the dignity of victims. Public hearings validated the victims by providing them a public forum to share their experiences. Thematic hearings were held to examine critical aspects, such as anti-subversive legislation, displaced persons, universities, women, and teachers.

==== Gender analysis ====
The TRC's mandate did not include a specific obligation to a gender perspective or a special analysis of gender-based crimes, but it became concerned with incorporating a gender perspective in its work. A gender perspective widens the scope of victimization and introduces new crimes that are subject to investigation. The commission held a public forum to establish the importance of the role of women in the internal conflict, as well as provided training workshops for TRC teams and volunteers. It investigated how the violence affected men and women differently, the participation of women in the Shining Path and the Túpac Amaru Revolutionary Movement, and it considered a broad spectrum of sexual abuse and violence. The TRC's final report included a chapter on sexual violence and gender analysis, as well as proposing several recommendations.

=== Authority ===
The mandate authorized specific framework for the TRC to work within. All relevant state information and documentation was made accessible to the commission. The commission was authorized to conduct interviews to collect relevant information, including interviews of authorities and public officials. Visits and inspections of affected areas were permitted with the assistance of experts. When necessary, the commission could request security measures for those who required them. The commission was authorized to develop public hearings and reserved procedures, establish communication channels, and promote participation of the population of those affected by political violence. The commission did not have any jurisdictional functions, however it provided assistance in the prosecutions that developed as a result of the final report.

== Structure ==
=== Commissioners ===
The commission was composed of twelve Peruvian commissioners, ten men and two women. Initially it consisted of seven commissioners, however President Alejandro Toledo increased the number of commissioners, as well adding an observer position. Commissioners were appointed by the President with the approval of the Council of Ministers. To qualify for the position of commissioner, one had to be a Peruvian national with prestige and legitimacy, defending democratic and constitutional values.

=== Initial commissioners ===
- The President of the TRC, Dr. Salomón Lerner Febres: philosopher and rector of Pontificia Universidad Católica del Perú
- Dr. Beatriz Alva Hart: Lawyer and former member of the Congress of Peru
- Dr. Enrique Bernales Ballesteros: Doctor at Law, executive director of the Andean Jurists Commission.
- Dr. Carlos Iván Degregori Caso: Anthropologist, professor at Universidad Nacional Mayor de San Marcos, and member of the Instituto de Estudios Peruanos
- Father Gastón Garatea Yori: Sacred Hearts priest and president of the Consensus Building Table for Poverty Fighting
- Sofía Macher Batanero: Sociologist and former Executive Secretary of the Human Rights National Coordinator
- Carlos Tapia García: Engineer, Political researcher and analyst.

=== Added commissioners ===
- Dr. Rolando Ames Cobián: Sociologist, political researcher and analyst
- Luis Arias Grazziani: Retired Air Force Lieutenant General and an expert in national security issues
- Minister Humberto Lay Sun: Architect and leader of the Assemblies of God, evangelical denomination of the Evangelic National Concilium, CONEP
- Monsignor José Antúndez de Mayolo: La Salle priest and former apostolic administrator of the Ayacucho Archdiocese
- Alberto Morote Sánchez: Engineer and former President of Universidad San Cristóbal de Huamanga

As observer:

- Monsignor Luis Bambarén Gastelumendi: Bishop of Chimbote and president of the Peruvian Episcopal Conference

=== Executive Secretariat ===
The Executive Secretariat is an organ that assisted the commission, being in charge of administrative management and the execution of approved programs. The Secretariat consisted of an executive secretary and officials from a variety of professional backgrounds. The executive secretary was Javier Ciurlizza Contreras, the former Secretary General of the Andean Jurists Commission and former head of cabinet of the Ministry Of Justice.

=== Offices ===
The commission opened five regional offices to cover all the national territory and carry out its work. The Regional offices were located in Lima, Huanuco, Huancayo, Huamanga, and Abancay, each focusing on specific provinces of Peru. The commission had approximately five hundred people in their staff working within the regional offices. Regional offices managed decentralized offices, known as Zone Offices, organized by a zone coordinator, as well as fixed and mobile teams. The fixed and mobile teams collected testimonies, filled out records, made reports, investigated cases, and promoted dissemination and education initiatives. Short-term teams and research groups have also been established to perform tasks for a fixed period. In areas with high indigenous populations, local leaders were used as translators, including Asháninka activist Luzmila Chiricente Mahuanca.

=== Mental Health Team ===
The Mental Health Team was to design and develop a psychosocial proposal that addressed the possible emotional impact of the TRC's process. The team sought to understand the effects of crimes and human rights violations on individuals and their social relations. The team addresses subjective aspects and interrelated dimensions of individual and group dynamics to identify difficulties and resources for the commission. With results of the psychosocial analysis, the team presented alternative proposals and recommendations that offer strategies to address problems and create conditions that promote comprehensive development.

=== Documentation centre ===
The documentation centre provided information services to all teams and areas of the TRC. The Centre facilitated access to information on the commission's work by organizing and storing all documents into an official archive, including case, video, audio, photography and other files. The internal service of the Centre terminated at the end of the commission's mandate, and all the documents were transferred to the ombudsman's office.

=== Funding ===
The budget for the commission was approximately $13 million US for the 2 years of operation, and nearly half of the funding came from international donors. The United Nations supported the Peruvian Government because of its commitment to truth and reconciliation. The UN argued that international funding must supplement the Government's effort, including a cancellation of debt to reallocate finances in support of social programs. The Government signed an agreement with the United Nations Development Program (UNDP) for the commission to receive funding. The agreement transfers government resources to the UNDP, gives them authority over the allocation of funds, and commits the UNDP to provide management and auditing services

== Functions ==
The TRC's main objective was to investigate human rights violations, and was achieved through various research strategies that led to the commission's conclusions and recommendations. The commission's work was oriented towards investigating the truth, understanding the causes of violence, and ultimately proposing government reparations and reforms. The research conducted by the commission covered nearly all national territories affected by the internal conflict, with an emphasis on remote communities.

=== Collection of testimonies ===
Testimonies was considered to be an intrinsic aspect of the TRC's research because it allowed the voices of the victims of violence. The commission traveled throughout the entire country to gather testimonies from people from 129 provinces and 509 districts. Testimonies collected necessary data about the victims and events in which they were involved, in order to understand the complexity of the violence that the country experienced. The TRC collected approximately 17 000 testimonies about the violence experienced in Peru between 1980 and 2000. The collection of testimonies demonstrated how violence was experiences differently between groups of people throughout the country. Overall, 54% of testimonies were given by women; within the Ayacucho region, women gave 64% of the testimonies. Public hearings were used as a platform to publish testimonies. Those who provided private testimonies where invited to share them again at a public hearing. The TRC held 27 public hearings, featuring testimonies from 422 people on 318 separate allegations of human rights abuses.

=== Analysis of crimes and human rights violations ===
The commission used a systematization of the gathered information to analyze human rights violations in the period 1980 and 2000. An analysis of crimes committed by rebel groups or state agents, systematic or widespread practice of violations of human rights, and political strategies allows for the commission to determine responsibility for the violence. The commission focused on, but was not limited to, massacres, disappearances, torture, internal displacement, terrorist attacks, and violence against women. The analysis of crimes and human rights violations provided a framework for recommendations of institutional reform policies necessary to consolidate a democratic and peaceful society.

=== Exhumations ===
The commission requested to observe exhumations in order to address the numerous massacres committed by both state agents and rebel groups. The remains of the victims were permitted to be claimed by their relatives to allow for dignified burials. The TRC signed an agreement with the Attorney General's Office to assist in the exhumation of clandestine graves and the forensic examination of the remains. The exhumations provided information on circumstances of death, identity of missing people, and used as evidence in prosecutions. The TRC oversaw three major exhumation projects, however official exhumations continued after the end of the TRC's mandate. 2,556 bodies have been found, of which 1,525 have been identified, and 1,366 have been claimed by their families.

=== Missing persons initiative ===
The commission argued that forced disappearances is not only a violation of the individual's human right, but is also cruelty towards the family that lives in permanent uncertainty, and thus the missing persons committee was created to assist friends and families of the victims of disappearances. An estimated 15,000 people disappeared within the timeframe of the TRC's mandate. Following the final report of the TRC, the International Committee of the Red Cross published a provisional list of the missing people as a joint effort with TRC, Public Prosecutor's Office, and the National Coordinator for Human Rights.

=== In-depth case studies ===
The commission gathered information through in-depth case studies to understand the nature of the human rights violations. The cases demonstrate the complexity of violence and reveal patterns, such as rape, violence by regions, behaviors of the conflict actors, and political strategies. Case studies provided information of the circumstances of specific situation, and simultaneously allows the commission to recompose the order of events. The commission conducted interviews with actors and witnesses of violence to gain regional stories and clarify historical events.

=== Photographic project ===
The photography project was a means of reconciliation intended to understand various aspects and effects of the internal conflict through a visual narrative to impact the future and ensure that the situation is not repeated. The TRC commissioned a transmedia photography project, Yuyanapaq, to build a collective memory of the internal conflict. Yuyanapaq means 'to remember' in Quechua, Peru's predominant indigenous language. The photography exhibition was established based on the assertion that truth is expressed in many forms and to recount and visual representations are invaluable to reconcile with the past. The project was led by Mayu Mohanna and Nancy Chappell, selecting images from over 90 archives, including photos from personal albums, the press and news agencies, the Armed Forces and Police, human rights organizations, community photography projects, and the Church. Yuyanapaq became available through an online photographic archive, photography book, photo exhibition, and multiple travelling exhibitions.

== Conclusions ==
The TRC's two years of investigations and research led to several conclusions that were presented in the final report, released on 28 August 2003. Based on evidence discovered during the investigations of deaths and disappearances, the TRC was able to provide an accurate estimation of the number deaths that were the result of the internal conflict. It was originally estimated that only 24,000 people died or disappeared, however the TRC concluded that approximately 69,280 died or disappeared as a result of the internal conflict in Peru between 1980 and 2000.

The TRC assessed responsibility for the crimes and human rights violations and determined key the perpetrators. The Shining Path was the principle perpetrator, being responsible for 54% of the deaths. The Shining Path targeted unarmed civilians as part of their strategy to devastate communities as a whole. The Túpac Amaru Revolutionary Movement was responsible for 1.5% of the deaths and 1.8% of the total number of human rights violations. Rebel groups were largely responsible for the recruitment of minors who were apprehended and forced to participate in acts of war. The Peruvian state was responsible for 37% of the deaths and disappearances, including agents of the military, police, other security forces, and political parties. Various human rights violations were carried out by State officials to obtain information, confessions, or incriminate others, as well as to punish individuals and communities. State agents systematically inflicted torture and other forms of cruel, inhuman or degrading treatment, mainly in military detention centres, police stations, and counter-terrorism units. 83% of sexual violence against women and girls were attributed to state officials.

The TRC also discovered that rural areas were disproportionately affected by violence, especially those of indigenous communities. Indigenous peoples have historically been the country's most marginalized population, and they became the groups most affected by violence. Although only 29% of the national population lives in rural regions, they represented 79% of the victims of violence. 75% of those who died as a result of the conflict spoke Quechua or another Indigenous language as their first language, when only 16% of the national population's first language is an Indigenous language. Violence was most concentrated in rural, Indigenous, and impoverished regions of the country, in which 45% of reported deaths and disappearances were from the Ayacucho region. Overall, 85% of victims were from the departments of Ayacucho, Junín, Huánuco, Huancavelica, Apurímac and San Martín. Although the internal conflict was not caused by ethnic tensions, the TRC argues that the results represent veiled racism that exists in Peruvian society.

== Recommendations ==
=== Reconciliation with justice ===
The TRC understood reconciliation as a foundational pact between the State and society to build a better country, therefore reconciliation must use the justice system to provide reparations and punish the perpetrators. The TRC recommended that all those accused of crimes and human rights abuses must assume responsibility before the courts, and no one should be given amnesty. 43 cases including killings, extrajudicial executions, forced disappearances, torture and ill-treatment, and sexual violence and massacres in communities and prisons were forwarded to the Ombudsman's Office and the Public Prosecutor's Office, identifying both State agents and opposition groups as perpetrators.

=== Institutional reforms ===
The TRC recommended institutional reforms as a preventative measure to ensure that an internal conflict will not reoccur.

==== State presence ====
The results of investigations demonstrated that the extent of conflict depended on State presence or institutional mechanisms of regions. The TRC recommended that the rights of indigenous peoples should be recognized and protected in national legislation to reaffirm diversity and plurality in Peru. Mechanisms should be implemented to prevent abuses by establishing policies and standards for law enforcement that facilitate collaboration between the National Police, municipal authorities, and citizens.

==== Security forces ====
The TRC recommended that the government should create new regulations to limit the powers of armed forces during a state of emergency. Recommendations for the development of a national security policy and establishment of civilian authority over military intelligence services were issued, as well as to determine respective jurisdictions between the Armed Forces and the Police.

==== Administration of justice ====
The TRC recommended that military jurisdiction be limited to service-related offences to strengthen the independence of the justice system. The commission stated that International human rights law and international humanitarian law should be incorporated into domestic legislations. The TRC also recommended reforms to the prison system to guarantee rights for detainees, as wells as introducing rehabilitation and social reintegration programs.

==== Education system ====
The TRC recommended that the education system promote and respect for ethnic and cultural differences by integrating children from the poorest areas that were most affected by the violence. Basic literacy should be taught to teenage and adult women in rural areas with high literacy rates, as well as an improvement to infrastructure and staffing in rural schools.

=== Reparations ===
The TRC recommended the creation of an Integral Reparations Plan to provide reparations to victims & victims' families. The Integral Reparations Plan was a comprehensive plan to help victims of the internal armed conflict to regain their personal dignity and ensure they are given back their rights as citizens, as well as providing compensation for the social and material damage caused to their community. Beneficiaries of the Plan are any individual who suffered abuses of international human rights law, including those who were subject to forced disappearance, kidnapping, extrajudicial execution, murder, displacement, arbitrary detention, forced recruitment, torture and rape, as well as those who were injured or killed as a result of attacks. The TRC also recommended several different types of reparations:

==== Symbolic reparations ====
The TRC recommended that places associated with human rights violations be shut down or renovated, including certain detention centres such as Challapalca Prison and El Callao Naval Base. Events should also be held to recognize the importance and seriousness of the human rights violation that occurred.

==== Reparations in health ====
Free health care programs should be implemented to provide mental and physical treatment, including specialists for women.

==== Reparations in education ====
Grant programs should be created to exempt those who were forced to give up education from paying tuition fees. Adult education programs should be implemented in areas most affected by violence.

==== Reparations in society ====
The commission recommended reparations related to the restoration of full citizen status and elimination of social stigma. The legal status of the "disappeared" should be changed to "absent due to disappearance" to allow relatives to settle succession, property and ownership of goods matters. The legal situation of citizens who were wrongly accused of terrorism should be regularized, as well as expunging records of innocent prisoners who have been acquitted. The TRC recommended a general program that issues new documentation to those without identity documents as a result of the internal conflict.

==== Financial reparations ====
Individual compensation should be offered to the relatives of those who died or disappeared, people left with physical or mental disabilities, people who were unjustly imprisoned, and the victims of sexual violence and children born as a result of rape. Collective compensation should be offered to rebuild institutions in indigenous communities and other regions in which social and physical infrastructure were lost as a result of the internal conflict.

=== Forensic program ===
The TRC recommended for the continuation of exhumations and investigations into the disappeared. The development of the National Anthropological-Forensic Research Plan is intended to authenticate burial sites and reveal more accurate number of deaths from the internal conflict. The TRC argued that progress can be made in investigations, legal proceedings, and the reparation process by returning remains of victims.

== Impact ==
The High Level Multi-Sectoral Commission was established to supervise collective reparations to communities affected by the violence. This Commission followed up on the recommendations of the TRC and oversaw State action and policy on matters relating to peace, reparations and reconciliation. Its goal was to implement reparations programs to re-build social links between State and Community, however only 65% of projects were carried out by 2007.

By 2004, 3 of the 43 cases submitted to the Public Prosecutor's Office by the TRC have been brought to trial: the alleged arrest and extrajudicial execution of residents of the district of Totos in Ayacucho in April 1983; extrajudicial executions of the Quispillaccta peasant community, in the district of Chuschi, in March 1991; and the murder of 34 inhabitants of Lucmahuaycco in November 1984. 81 cases were completed at the National Criminal Division between 2005 and 2011, which resulted in 58 convictions and 195 acquittals.

In 2005, a Comprehensive Reparations Plan was approved and issued by executive decree 2006, comprising six programs: Restitution of Civil Rights, Education, Health Care, Collective Reparations, Symbolic Reparations, Promotion and Access to Housing, and Economic Reparations or Compensation.

Since 2005, The Inter-American Court of Human Rights has found the state of Peru liable for 16 violations of human rights committed during the internal armed conflict, including for massacres, summary executions, enforced disappearances, torture, and violations of judicial guarantees. On 13 October 2006, a civil anti-terrorism sentenced the Shining Path's leader and his deputy to life in prison, as well as delivering lesser sentences to ten other rebel leaders.

In 2008, The National Council for Reparation began registering victims in order to provide individual reparations according to the TRC recommendations. By 2013, the council had registered 160,429 individual victims and 7,678 communities, including 32 organizations of displaced people. In 2012, the High Level Multi-Sectoral Commission proposed the Comprehensive Reparations Plan, a 5-year financial compensation program. By December 2012, 17,652 victims were beneficiaries of compensation, a total investment of 96 million soles ($36.7 million US).

== Prosecution of Fujimori ==
On 27 August 2001, the Peruvian Congress lifted Alberto Fujimori's immunity and declared that he was responsible for crimes against humanity. President Toledo requested the Japanese authorities to extradite Fujimori to Peru, but was rejected. On 7 November 2005, Fujimori was arrested in Chile at the request of the Peruvian government, and later transported to Peru to be put on trial on 22 September 2007.

Fujimori was on trial for human rights abuses from December 2007 until April 2009. The charges against him in regards to major incidence of crimes and violations: The 1991 Barrios Altos massacre, the killings of nine students and a professor at La Cantuta University in 1992, and the kidnappings of journalist Gustavo Gorriti and businessman Samuel Dyer. Other charges against Fujimori included abuse of authority, illegal wiretapping, bribery, and corruption. The Supreme Court of Peru found Fujimori guilty, and he was sentenced to twenty-five years in prison. He was also ordered to pay reparations to survivors and victims' relatives. An appeal was filed, however the verdict was sustained.

On 10 October 2012, Fujimori submitted a petition for presidential pardon on humanitarian grounds, due to tongue cancer. On 24 December 2017, President Pedro Pablo Kuczynski granted Fujimori medical pardon, after he had served 12 years of his sentence. The victims of Pativilca requested the National Criminal Court to deny the pardon. On 19 February 2018, the National Criminal Court ruled that the former president must stand trial for his responsibility crimes against humanity.

== Reactions ==
The TRC generated controversies throughout the mandate and with its final report. Some argue that the TRC's mandate was too focused and did not adequately address certain communities' experiences. Approximately 200 000 impoverished Indigenous women were sterilized without proper consent by the Fujimori government, and the final report was insufficient in acknowledging the impact on their communities.

Many of the controversies are related to the Shining Path. Many argue that the TRC's final report is biased against the Peruvian military and biased toward the Shining Path and other rebel groups. Commissioner Sofia Macher referred to the Shining Path as a "political party", and many Peruvians felt that was suggesting that the commission was sympathetic to terrorism. Despite the report's conclusions that the majority of human rights violations were carried out by rebel groups, the TRC still received criticisms for its "anti-military" bias. Many members of Peruvian society argue that Shining Path members were terrorists, and are therefore undeserving to be labelled a victim, as well as arguing that state forces were doing their constitutional duty during the years of violence.

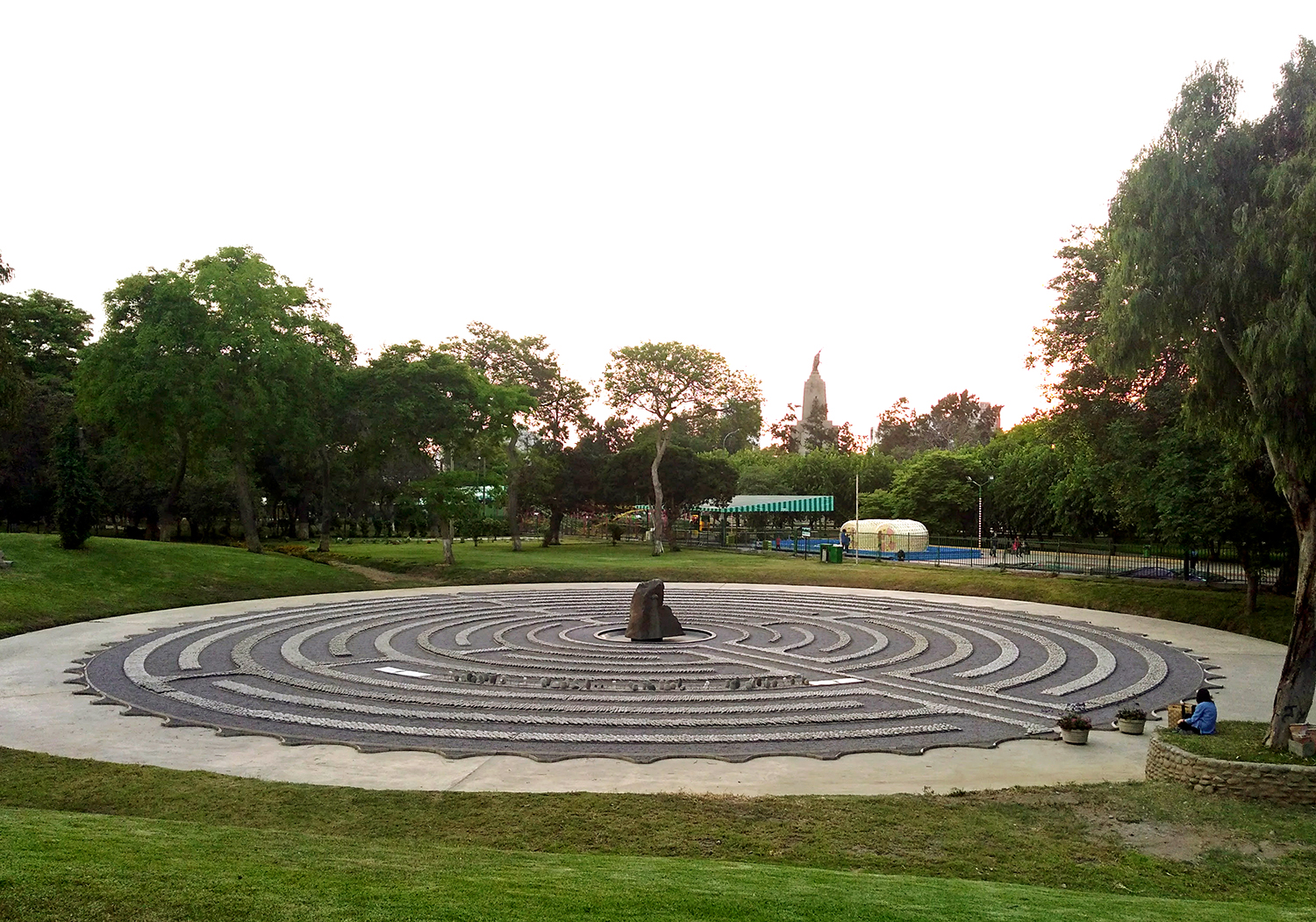
El Ojo que Llora. The monument to commemorate the victims killed during the internal conflict of Peru.

Social stigma exists within Peruvian society that associates former rebel group members with terrorism, and that they are not truly victims of the internal conflict. A monument called El Ojo que Llora (The Eye that Cries) was built in 2005 to commemorate the victims of violence. The fountain is surrounded by rocks with inscriptions of the victims of violence. In November 2006, the Inter-American Court of Human Rights ordered that the names of the forty-one victims of the 1992 massacre in Castro Castro prison be added to the monument. Many of these victims were members of the Shining Path, causing outrage by some members of society. The monument was vandalized in 2007. The Place of Memory, Tolerance and Social Inclusion has also been controversial.

Despite the criticisms and controversies of the TRC, the commission is often regarded as one of the most successful truth and reconciliation commission. Priscilla Hayner argues that Peru's TRC is one of the strongest commissions for its thorough investigations within a wide scope of human rights abuses. The TRC is recognized for the successful execution of a wide and complex mandate, and is studied by different countries engaged in truth-seeking. The TRC was a success when analyzed by its mandate and final report. Within the 2 years of work, the TRC established the truth about two decades of violence, provided comprehensive recommendations for reforms, prosecutions, and reparations that could begin the process of reconciliation, as well as completing the final report that was disseminated to the public.
