= Elena Yparraguirre =

Peruvian terrorist

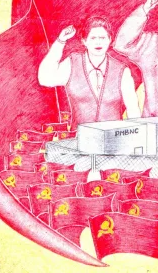
- Elena Yparraguirre as depicted in part of a Shining Path propaganda poster
- Born: Elena Albertina Yparraguirre Revoredo; September 14, 1947 (age 79); Ica, Peru
- Other name: Miriam
- Organization: Shining Path
- Spouse: Abimael Guzmán (m. 1989; died 2021)
- Criminal charge: Terrorism
- Penalty: Life imprisonment

Elena Albertina Yparraguirre Revoredo (Spanish pronunciation: [eˌlena albeɾˌtina iparaˌɡire reboˈɾedo]; born 14 September 1947), also known as "Miriam" (Spanish: Míriam; [ˈmiɾjam]), is a high-ranking member of the Peruvian Maoist revolutionary party Sendero Luminoso (Shining Path).

== Life ==
Yparraguirre, a major female figure in the Shining Path, became the second-in-command, as well as Abimael Guzmán's lover and wife after his first wife Augusta la Torre's death in 1988.

She was married to Guzmán, also known as Chairman Gonzalo, from 1989 until his death in 2021. In 2014, she published the book Memorias desde Némesis, which tells the story of their experiences.

Yparraguirre was captured in Lima in 1992 along with her partner, Shining Path founder Abimael Guzmán. In 1992, she received a sentence of life imprisonment by a secret military tribunal. She was awarded a new trial in a civilian court in 2004, but the proceeding ended as a mistrial. After a third trial in 2006, both Yparraguirre and Guzmán again received life sentences.
