= Abimael Guzmán =

Peruvian Maoist convicted terrorist leader (1934–2021)

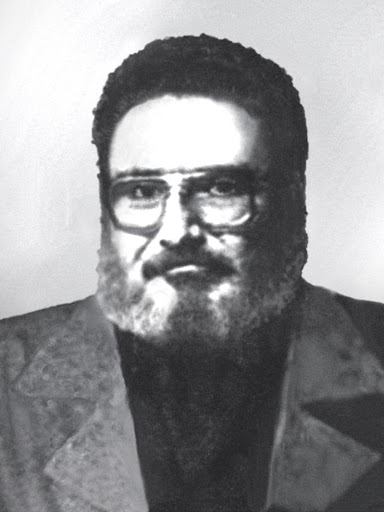
- Portrait of Guzmán

Chairman of the Communist Party of Peru
- In office 1969 – 12 September 1992
- Preceded by: Office established
- Succeeded by: Óscar Ramírez

Chairman of the New Democratic Republic
- In office 17 May 1980 – 12 September 1992
- Preceded by: Office established
- Succeeded by: Office abolished

Personal details
- Born: Manuel Rubén Abimael Guzmán Reinoso; 3 December 1934 Mollendo, Peru
- Died: 11 September 2021 (aged 86) Callao, Peru
- Party: Communist Party of Peru – Shining Path
- Spouses: Augusta La Torre (m. 1964; died 1988) Elena Yparraguirre (m. 1989)
- Education: National University of San Agustín
- Occupation: Professor, revolutionary
- Nickname(s): Comrade Gonzalo, Chairman Gonzalo, Fourth sword of Marxism-Leninism-Maoism

Military service
- Branch/service: People's Guerrilla Army
- Rank: Commander
- Battles/wars: Internal conflict in Peru
- Criminal information
- Status: Died in custody
- Convictions: Terrorism; Murder
- Penalty: Two life sentences

Manuel Rubén Abimael Guzmán Reinoso (Latin American Spanish: [maˈnwel ruˈβ̞en aβ̞imaˈel ɣ̞uzˈman rejˈnoso]; 3 December 1934 − 11 September 2021), also known by his nom de guerre Chairman Gonzalo (Spanish: Presidente Gonzalo; [pɾesiˌð̞ente ɣ̞onˈsalo]), was a Peruvian Maoist revolutionary, guerrilla leader, and former philosophy professor. He founded the organization Communist Party of Peru – Shining Path (PCP-SL) in 1969 and led a rebellion against the Peruvian government until his capture by authorities on 12 September 1992. He was then sentenced to life imprisonment for terrorism and treason.

Guzmán joined the Communist Party when he was about 20 years old. In the 1960s and 1970s, he was a professor of philosophy active in far-left politics strongly influenced by Marxism, Leninism, and Maoism. He developed an ideology of armed struggle stressing the empowerment of the Indigenous people. He went underground in the mid-1960s to become the leader of the Shining Path, which began "The People's War" or the "Armed Struggle" on 17 May 1980.

== Early life ==
Manuel Rubén Abimael Guzmán Reinoso was born on 3 December 1934 in Mollendo, a port town in the province of Islay, in the region of Arequipa, about 1,000 km (620 mi) south of Lima. He was the illegitimate son of an accountant who had ten children with five women. Guzmán's mother, Berenice Reinoso, died when he was five.

At Arequipa, Guzmán completed his bachelor's degrees in philosophy and law. He then earned his doctoral degree. His dissertations were titled The Kantian Theory of Space and The Bourgeois Democratic State. While in university, Guzmán became a Marxist–Leninist. In 1962, he was recruited as a professor of philosophy by the rector of San Cristóbal of Huamanga University in Ayacucho, Efraín Morote Best, an anthropologist who some believe was the true intellectual leader of the "Shining Path" movement. Encouraged by Morote, Guzmán studied Quechua, the language of Peru's Indigenous population, and became increasingly active in left-wing political circles.

In 1965, Guzmán attended a cadre training course in China, returning to Lima and taking a leave of absence from his professorship to focus on party activism. In April 1967, he led his faction of the PCP to an international meeting in Albania. He returned to China in August and September. This placed him in China during the Cultural Revolution, which made a large impression on him. Guzmán was particularly influenced by the ideological position of the Gang of Four.

Through his academic position, Guzmán developed a core of early supporters among rural teachers, university professors, and the university student movement. He was arrested twice during the 1970s for participating in violent riots in the city of Arequipa against the government of presidents Velasco Alvarado and Belaunde Terry. After serving as the head of personnel for San Cristóbal of Huamanga University, Guzmán left the institution in the mid-1960s and went underground.

In the 1975, the Peruvian Communist Party splintered over ideological and personal disputes. Guzmán, who had taken a pro-Chinese rather than pro-Soviet line, emerged as the leader of the faction that came to be known as the "Shining Path" (Mariátegui wrote once: "Marxism–Leninism is the shining path of the future"). In 1970, Bandera Roja expelled Guzmán because of his and his group's "occultism"—a Marxist-Leninist term for refusing or being unable to carry out open or legal political work and excessively focusing on covert activities.

Guzmán adopted the nom de guerre Presidente or Comrade Gonzalo and began advocating a Maoist peasant-led revolution. His followers declared Guzmán, who cultivated anonymity, the "Fourth Sword of Communism" (after Lenin, Stalin and Mao). He praised Mao's development of Lenin's thesis regarding "the role of imperialism" in propping up the "bourgeois capitalist system", claiming that imperialism ultimately "creates disruption and is unsuccessful, and it will end up in ruins in the next 50 to 100 years". Guzmán applied this criticism not only to U.S. imperialism but also Soviet imperialism, what he called "social-imperialism" (in accordance with the Chinese stance after the Sino-Soviet split).

In February 1964, he married Augusta La Torre, who was instrumental in founding Shining Path. She died under unclear circumstances in 1988. Guzmán and Elena Yparraguirre, a longtime lieutenant of Guzmán's and his lover, have both refused to discuss La Torre's fate. In 2006, while in prison, Guzmán proposed to Yparraguirre, who is also serving a life sentence in a separate prison. After fighting for permission to marry with a hunger strike, the couple wed in 2010.

Guzmán long identified with atheism. He agreed with Karl Marx that religion is the "opium of the people" and said it would end with exploitation. But he requested respect for religious diversity and said religion would not be an obstacle for the armed struggle.

== Insurgency ==
The Shining Path movement was at first largely confined to academic circles in Peruvian universities. The 1976 downfall of the Gang of Four convinced Guzmán that China had become revisionist, and that communist revolution required the directing of a people's war that maintained ideological purity.

In the late 1970s, the Shining Path movement developed into a guerrilla group centered around Ayacucho. In May 1980, the group launched its war against the government of Peru by burning the ballot boxes in Chuschi, a village near Ayacucho, in an effort to disrupt the first democratic elections in the country since 1964. Shining Path eventually grew to control vast rural territories in central and southern Peru and achieved a presence even in the outskirts of Lima, where it staged numerous attacks. The purpose of Shining Path's campaign was to demoralize and undermine the government of Peru in order to create a situation conducive to a violent coup which would put its leaders in power. The Shining Path targeted not only the army and police, but also government employees at all levels, other leftist militants such as members of the Túpac Amaru Revolutionary Movement (MRTA), workers who did not participate in the strikes organized by the group, peasants who cooperated with the government in any way (including by voting in democratic elections), and middle-class inhabitants of Peru's main cities. The Truth and Reconciliation Commission later estimated that the resulting conflict led to the deaths of some seventy thousand people, approximately half of them at the hands of the Shining Path and a third at the hands of the state. Guzmán's image as a dispassionate murderer became widespread after he moved against the city of Lima. After a series of bombings and selective assassinations the whole nation was shocked in 1992 when a car bomb exploded in one of Lima's busiest commercial districts on Tarata street, thus causing many casualties and enormous material losses. Guzmán denied responsibility for the Tarata bombing, claiming it was carried out without his knowledge.

The movement promoted the writings of Guzmán, called "Gonzalo Thought", a new "theoretical understanding" that built upon Marxism, Leninism, and Maoism whereby he declared Maoism to be a "third and higher stage of Marxism," having defined Maoism as "people's war." In 1989, Guzmán declared that the Shining Path (which he referred to as the "Communist Party of Peru") had progressed from waging a people's war to waging a "war of movements." He further argued that this was a step towards achieving "strategic equilibrium" in the near future, based on Maoist theories of waging people's war. Guzmán claimed that such an equilibrium would manifest itself by ungovernability under the "old order." When that moment arrived, Guzmán believed that Shining Path would be ready to move on to its "strategic offensive".

In the 1991 Peruvian Annual Power Survey, Guzmán was ranked fourth among the ten most powerful people in Peru, having been fifth in 1990.

Soon, Guzmán believed the Peruvian People's War had entered a strategic stalemate, centering his views on the capital, Lima, as the "national level." He believed there were no capitalist roaders within the party, whom he considered exiled, and turned to Stalin, anticipating significant losses.

== The Captura del Siglo ==
In 1992, during the first administration of President Alberto Fujimori, the National Directorate Against Terrorism (DIRCOTE) began surveillance on several residences in Lima because agents suspected that terrorists were using them as safehouses. One of those residences, in the upper-class neighborhood of Surco, had been operating as a ballet studio. The DIRCOTE operatives routinely searched the garbage taken out from the house. The house was supposedly inhabited by only one person, the dance teacher Maritza Garrido Lecca, but it was soon noticed that the household produced more garbage than one person could account for. Furthermore, agents found discarded tubes of cream for the treatment of psoriasis, an ailment that Guzmán was known to have. On 12 September 1992, an elite unit of the DIRCOTE carried out Operation Victoria, raiding the Surco residence. On the second floor of the house, they found and arrested Guzmán and eight others, including Laura Zambrano and Elena Yparraguirre, Guzmán's female companion.

== Trials and imprisonment ==
Guzmán was tried by a military tribunal under provisions of articles 15 and 16 of Law 25475 adopted by Fujimori's government in May 1992. The identities of the judges were kept secret to Guzmán and the press, and proceedings were held in secret. After a three-day trial, Guzmán was sentenced to life imprisonment and incarcerated at the naval base on the island of San Lorenzo off the coast of Lima.

Subsequently, he was said to have negotiated with a presidential advisor at the time, Vladimiro Montesinos, in order to receive some benefits in exchange for helping the Peruvian government put an end to the Shining Path's militant activities. Guzmán appeared several times on Peruvian television and on 1 October 1993, he publicly declared "peace" with the Peruvian government. This declaration split the Shining Path and raised questions about the organization's future. About 6,000 guerrillas within the party accepted it as a sign of defeat and surrendered.

Guzmán's re-trial began on 5 November 2004. The international press was held in a sound-proof chamber and all media was banned from observing the trial after the Shining Path cadre turned their backs on the judges and delivered a revolutionary salute to the media gallery. The only words Guzmán spoke in the presence of the international press were "Long live the Communist Party of Peru! Glory to Marxism–Leninism–Maoism! Glory to the Peruvian people! Long live the heroes of the people's war!" After he made this statement, the courtroom microphones were silenced and the press was unable to hear any of the proceedings that followed. When the trial resumed on 12 November, no reporters were allowed to observe the proceedings. Eventually two of the judges recused themselves and the trial ended in chaos. Guzmán's third trial began in September 2005 and was opened and closed amid a media blackout. No reporters were allowed to attend.

=== Sentence ===
On 13 October 2006, Guzmán was sentenced to life in prison on charges of aggravated terrorism and murder. At his sentencing, three judges read the charges in a verdict that lasted more than six hours.

In 2014, Guzmán and his wife Yparraguirre were tried again, for the 1992 Tarata bombing in Lima in which 25 people died. On 11 September 2018, he was sentenced to a second life term in prison.

Guzmán was incarcerated in the maximum security prison of the naval base of Callao, the port of Lima, until his death in 2021. Fellow prisoners there include Víctor Polay, leader of the Túpac Amaru Revolutionary Movement, and Vladimiro Montesinos, the former head of the National Intelligence Service who supervised the construction of the prison and served under the President Alberto Fujimori.

== Death ==
On 13 July 2021, he was attended by medical personnel of the Ministry of Health after he refused to eat. He was given blood tests and an ultrasound. A few days later, on 17 July, he was transferred to a hospital for further monitoring. He died on 11 September 2021 at the Maximum Safety Center of the Callao Naval Base, at the age of 86.

Guzmán's body was cremated at sunrise on 24 September 2021 and his ashes were dispersed in a secret location in order to prevent a monument honoring him from being created.
