= Florabel Vargas =

Peruvian terrorist

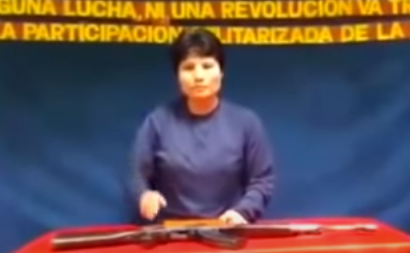
- Vargas in 2018

Spokeswoman of the Militarized Communist Party of Peru
- Incumbent
- Assumed office March 30, 2021
- Preceded by: Jorge Quispe Palomino

Personal details
- Born: c. 1980 (46 age) Chuschi, Peru
- Domestic partner: Marco Antonio Quispe Palomino (died 2013)
- Children: Iván, Marco
- Nickname: Comrade Vilma

Military service
- Allegiance: MPCP (since 2018); Shining Path (1980s–2018)
- Active: 1990–present
- Battles/wars: Internal conflict in Peru

Florabel Vargas Figueroa, also known as Comrade Vilma, is a Peruvian former member of the Shining Path and current spokeswoman of the Militarized Communist Party of Peru (MPCP), serving as the group's fourth-in-command.

== Biography ==
Vargas was born in Chuschi. She was kidnapped along her parents and sister María by Shining Path members, who abducted the sisters after killing their parents. After Abimael Guzmán's capture in 1992, she assisted in the group's reorganisation. Her sister María had a son, Roger Guevara Vargas, who did not manage to be rescued with his then 13-year-old mother in 1997, being taken under the wing of Florabel until his escape in 2014. Within the group, she was in charge of its children, called the "young pioneers". She became romantically acquainted with Marco Antonio Quispe Palomino ("Comrade Gabriel"), with whom she had two children: Iván and Marco.

In 2018, the group's leader, Víctor Quispe Palomino ("Comrade José"), announced the establishment of the Militarized Communist Party of Peru (MPCP). Following the death of Jorge Quispe Palomino in 2021, Vargas became the group's fourth-in-command and official spokeswoman.

In 2020, a column headed by Vargas ambushed military units in the VRAEM region, killing an officer, a police sub-officer, and an army captain.

In 2021, Vargas called on people to boycott that year's general elections. She also threatened Mario Monteverde, owner of Radio Tarma, and journalists Beto Ortiz, Milagros Leiva, and Jaime Bayly. The former threat led to a group attacking the radio station. After Pedro Castillo was elected president, she threatened to kill both him and then Prime Minister Guido Bellido if they threatened the group's coca production operation instead of supporting it.

During the social protests of 2023, she—alongside Comrade Olga—called for Vladimir Putin and Xi Jinping's assistance to overthrow president Dina Boluarte, while calling the ousted Castillo a traitor.

On September 30, 2023, her son Marco ("Gabrielito") and his partner Alexi Berrocal ("Comrade Rafael") were captured alongside weapons and munitions.

== See also ==
- Jorge Quispe Palomino
- Víctor Quispe Palomino
