= Militarized Communist Party of Peru =

Communist organization labeled as a terrorist group in Peru

- Militarizado Partido Comunista del Perú
- Other name: See list: Shining Path remnants (Note: This denomination (Spanish: Remanentes de Sendero Luminoso) is used by the Peruvian government alongside the name "Shining Path in the VRAEM" (Spanish: Sendero Luminoso en el VRAEM).); Pro-Seguir (Note: Its name (Spanish: Partido Comunista del Perú Pro-Seguir; 1992–2018) comes from its opposition to the peace talks between the Peruvian government and Abimael Guzmán following the latter's capture in 1992, instead opting to continue (Spanish: seguir) the armed conflict. It was otherwise known as Sendero Rojo, Partido Comunista del Perú Marxista-Leninista-Maoísta (PCP M-L-M), or simply as Sendero Luminoso Pro-Seguir (SL Pro-Seguir).)
- Leader: Comrade José
- Dates active: 1992–present (Note: First acknowledged by the Peruvian government as an entity separate from the Shining Path in 2018.)
- Split from: Shining Path
- Allegiance: China (self-claim); FUDARP (2018–2022)
- Active regions: VRAEM
- Ideology: Communism; Marxism–Leninism–Maoism; Xi Jinping Thought; Bolivarianism; Anti-capitalism; Anti-revisionism; Andean ultranationalism; Ethno-nationalism; Ethnocacerism; Social conservatism; Anti-LGBTQ rhetoric; Anti-Huallaga faction
- Political position: Far-left
- Status: Active
- Size: ~300 (2022)
- Wars: Internal conflict in Peru

The Militarized Communist Party of Peru (Spanish: Militarizado Partido Comunista del Perú, MPCP) (Note: Until 2018, the MPCP was unofficially referred to as the Remanentes de Sendero Luminoso (Shining Path remnants) or the Sendero Luminoso en el VRAEM (Shining Path in the VRAEM); the Peruvian government continues to refer to the MPCP as the direct successor to the Shining Path.) is a political party and militant group in Peru that follows Marxism–Leninism–Maoism and participates in the communist insurgency in Peru. It is considered a terrorist organization by the government of Peru. The MPCP operates primarily in the VRAEM area and is involved in the area's coca production. Comrade José has been the leader of the MPCP since its official creation after its final split from the declining Shining Path guerilla group.

The MPCP originated in the 1990s as the Communist Party of Peru – Pro-Seguir (PCP Pro-Seguir), forming after the capture of Abimael Guzmán. The party is considered the direct successor to the Shining Path by the government of Peru and other international entities, because most of its members splintered from the Shining Path in 1992. Ideologically, the group brands itself as a Maoist party, although its beliefs differ greatly from those of the Shining Path. The MPCP has maintained contact with Andean ultranationalist groups tied with the ethnocacerist movement. In 2018, the MPCP formed an alliance with the Plurinational Association of Tawantinsuyo Reservists, an ethnocacerist group, called the United Democratic Andean Revolutionary Front of Peru (Spanish: Frente Unido Democrático Andino Revolucionario del Perú). Diverging from other Maoist parties, the MPCP has voiced support for the modern-day Chinese Communist Party and its General Secretary Xi Jinping. The group has distanced itself from the Gonzalo Thought ideology and anti-religious stance of the Shining Path.

The MPCP has stated that it severed its ties with the leader of the Shining Path, Abimael Guzmán, after his capture in 1992 and subsequent call for peace in 1993. However, the MPCP itself has been accused of utilizing similar tactics to those of Guzmán, including slavery of indigenous peoples, recruitment of children for use as child soldiers, and terrorist attacks against civilians and members of the Peruvian government, among other human rights violations. The Peruvian military said that the group was responsible for the San Miguel del Ene attack on 23 May 2021, which resulted in the deaths of 18 people in the Satipo Province of Peru.

== Structure ==
=== Organisation ===
According to NGO Waynakuna Perú, the MPCP operates eight fronts in the VRAEM Valley with the intent of expanding outwards. Its main fronts are those in Ene, Mantaro, and Vizcatán, respectively led by Rubén Valle Rojas ("Comrade Javier"; deceased), Jorge Quispe Palomino ("Comrade Raúl"; deceased), and Víctor Quispe Palomino ("Comrade José"). In 2015, the group was numbered at around 60 to 80 people.

The group's current leadership includes the following:

- Víctor Quispe Palomino (Comrade José): leader of the group since Óscar Ramírez's capture in 1999.
- Tarcela Loya Vílchez (Comrade Olga): part of the group's leadership, described as its "number three" in 2013. Born in Tambobamba c. 1968, she joined the Shining Path while working as a teacher in Satipo, alongside her siblings Mauro and Bacilia. In 2007, she was reportedly given a USB drive by politician Guillermo Bermejo, which included the group's ideological foundation and instructed her to leave for Venezuela. Following the deaths of Alipio and Gabriel, she rose in the leadership's ranks. In 2018, she was identified as part of the group's leadership, leading the women's wing, and her son ("Comrade Basilio") was killed in a shootout in September of the same year. During the 2023 protests, she called for Vladimir Putin and Xi Jinping's assistance to overthrow president Dina Boluarte, while calling the ousted Pedro Castillo a traitor.
- Florabel Vargas Figueroa (Comrade Vilma): part of the group's leadership and official spokeswoman.

The group's former leadership included:

- Jorge Quispe Palomino (Comrade Raúl): part of the group's leadership until his death from an undisclosed kidney disease in 2021.
- Orlando Alejandro Borda Casafranca (Comrade Alipio): killed in a military operation in 2013, and described as the group's "number two" at the time.
- Martín Antonio Quispe Palomino (Comrade Gabriel): killed in a military operation in 2013, and described as the group's "number four" at the time

The MPCP maintains an arsenal of arms and anti-aircraft weapons, and has been noted for its use of social media, where it shares propaganda videos, which often depict their arsenal of weapons. It recruits much of its members from the VRAEM region's younger population, whom are sometimes described by media sources as child soldiers. The soldiers are paid between 1,800 and 2,000 soles and are trained at the party's "popular army schools". Through its control of most of the drug trade in the VRAEM region, it collects "war taxes" from non-affiliated narcotics traffickers.

==== Paramilitary wing ====
Revolutionary Armed Forces of Peru
- Fuerzas armadas revolucionarias del Perú
- Dates active: 9 June 2018 – present
- Active regions: Peru

Under the leadership of Víctor Quispe Palomino, the Shining Path's paramilitary wing, known as the People's Guerrilla Army (Ejército Guerrillero Popular, EGP), was reorganised as the Popular Revolutionary Army (Spanish: Ejército Popular Revolucionario; ERP) until the MPCP's formal establishment and distancing from Guzmán in June 2018, after which it has claimed the name of Revolutionary Armed Forces of Peru (Spanish: Fuerzas armadas revolucionarias del Perú).

In 2020, it was reported to have made money from selling cigarettes, clothes, candy, raffles and other methods.

=== Ideology ===
The MPCP regards itself as a communist and Marxist–Leninist–Maoist party, though it explicitly denounces the Gonzalo Thought ideology of the original Shining Path. Its actions are self-proclaimed as the "Prolonged Unitary Democratic People's War of Peru" (Spanish: Guerra Popular Democrática Prolongada Unitaria del Perú), organised as follows:

- First stage (1980–2008): known as the Agrarian Democratic People's War (Spanish: Guerra Popular Democrática Agraria), it is divided into three phases:
  - Phase 1: from the Chuschi incident to the capture of the central committee in 1992.
  - Phase 2: from the committee's capture in 1992 to Óscar Ramírez's capture in 1999.
  - Phase 3: from Ramírez's capture in 1999 to the execution of the "Plan Excelencia 777" by the Peruvian Armed Forces.
- Second stage (2008–present): known as the "Democratic People's War of Anti-imperialist National Resistance, mainly Yankee" (Spanish: Guerra Popular Democrática de Resistencia Nacional Antiimperialista, principalmente yanqui), it is divided into two phases:
  - Phase 1: from August 30, 2008, to April 25, 2011, when the group's second plenary session was held.
  - Phase 2: since April 25, 2011, when the third plenary session was held in 2013.
- Third stage: a planned stage known as the "People's Democratic War of National Liberation" (Spanish: Guerra Popular Democrática de Liberación Nacional), where a People's republic would be implemented in Peru.

Unlike other remnants, the MPCP rejects the “Political Solution” line of the New Red Faction (NFR) and the “Pro-Seguir” line of Comrade Feliciano and Comrade Artemio. They consider themselves the legitimate successors of Marxism-Leninism-Maoism, distancing themselves from Gonzalo Thought, which they accuse of being revisionist, and denouncing Abimael Guzmán as a traitor. MPCP adherents view the class struggle as a universal law and believe that the world has been in a phase known as “single-hegemonic super-imperialist capitalism” since 1991; they maintain that Peru, since that year, “is a colony in relation to the single hegemonic oligarchy, a semi-colony in relation to the super-socio-imperialist and super-imperialist oligarchies, and semi-feudal.” Furthermore, they proclaim that “the super-imperialist banking and industrial oligarchies are the global capitalist state and government operating from the shadows,” and that they are puppets of “the great puppeteer—the Zionist bankers of the Bilderberg Club."

It has been compared to the Revolutionary Armed Forces of Colombia due to its continued existence even after the collapse of its leadership. Unlike its predecessor, the MPCP claims to have abandoned its anti-religious sentiment and persecution, and seeks to reach an agreement through dialogue with the Peruvian government. In 2022, it proclaimed its allegiance to the Chinese Communist Party and its leader, Xi Jinping.

== History ==
=== Break with Abimael Guzmán ===
Following the capture of Abimael Guzmán, the founder and leader of the Shining Path, on 12 September 1992, a ceasefire agreement was reached with the government of then-Peruvian president Alberto Fujimori the subsequent year. After the announcement of the ceasefire agreement, the Shining Path was largely divided into two factions: members who supported Guzmán's ceasefire and those who considered Guzmán a "traitor" to the people's war. The faction opposed to the ceasefire referred to themselves as Sendero Luminoso-Proseguir (Shining Path-Onward) and continued to carry out armed struggle against the Peruvian state. Proseguir operated in two former Shining Path strongholds: the upper basin regions of the Huallaga River and the VRAEM region. The Huallaga faction, which remained loyal to Guzmán but opposed the ceasefire, was led by Comrade Artemio until his capture in 2012, while the VRAEM faction was initially led by Comrades Alipio and Gabriel. Following their deaths in 2013, Comrade José became the leader of the VRAEM faction.

In 2017, Diario Correo reported that a Maoist group known as the Militarized Communist Party of Peru had begun advocating for violence on Facebook; the publication stated that the group was likely a faction of Sendero Luminoso-Proseguir. On 9 June 2018, Comrade José officially announced the creation of the Militarized Communist Party of Peru, renouncing all ties to the Shining Path and Abimael Guzmán while additionally denouncing Proseguir members who collaborated with the Peruvian military during the capture of Comrade Feliciano. José had reportedly described himself as the successor to Guzmán and the leader of the Shining Path as early as 2008.

=== Activities and tactics ===
Flag used by the MPCP following their alliance with the ASPRET

In 2018, the MPCP announced an alliance with the ethnocacerist Plurinational Association of Tawantinsuyo Reservists (ASPRET), called the United Democratic Andean Revolutionary Front of Peru. A video recorded on 22 April 2017 showed Eddy Villarroel Medina, the leader of ASPRET, meeting with Comrade José. Following the formation of the alliance, Villarroel Medina became a spokesperson for the MPCP. In 2022, the alliance was terminated over Villarroel Medina's disagreements with the MPCP's alleged ties to Free Peru; Villarroel Medina later claimed that the party had threatened him and his family following the end of the alliance.

On 23 May 2021, the MPCP carried out the San Miguel del Ene attack, leaving behind leaflets that stated the attack was carried out to "clean VRAEM and Peru" of outcasts, "parasites and corrupts" as well as "homosexuals, lesbians, drug addicts" and "thieves". The leaflets additionally called for a boycott of the 6 June election, accusing of treason those who voted for Keiko Fujimori of the right-wing Popular Force party.

In March 2022, the MPCP publicly announced their embrace of the Chinese Communist Party (CCP), writing that "the militarized Peruvian communists [have] reorganized ourselves as militants of the glorious and victorious Chinese Communist Party, under the leadership of CCP general secretary Xi Jinping." In an audio message recorded by high-ranking party member Comrade Vilma, Vilma called on the party's militants to support China against "the United States and its NATO allies through the unjust fifth super-imperialist world war" and stated that Xi and the CCP had "never abandoned Maoism." The United States opposes the activities of the MPCP, with the U.S. Department of State offering a reward of US$5 million for information leading to the arrest of party leader Comrade José.

In November 2023, a bloodless police operation in Sayapo, known as Lobo II, captured four members of the MPCP who had been accused of being involved in the murder of 7 policemen in Cuzco the past February: José Quispe Zúñiga (the 24-year son of Comrade José), Iván Quispe Vargas (23; son of Marco Antonio "Comrade Gabriel" Quispe Palomino), Romeo Campos Mancilla (19) and Jheyson Andrés Ramos Andrade (24). José Quispe Zúñiga had been considered his father's (and thus the group's) successor.

In September 2024, a military operation saw the capture of Octavio Vargas Ñahuicopa (also known as "Ciperian"), who was identified as a main figure in the group. In October of the same year, a police operation led to the arrest of Iván Quispe Palomino, erroneously reported as a leader of the group. Despite being one of the Quispe Palomino siblings, he had no links to them of the group since his release from prison in 2005.

=== Territories ===
Areas in Peru where the MPCP is known to operate:

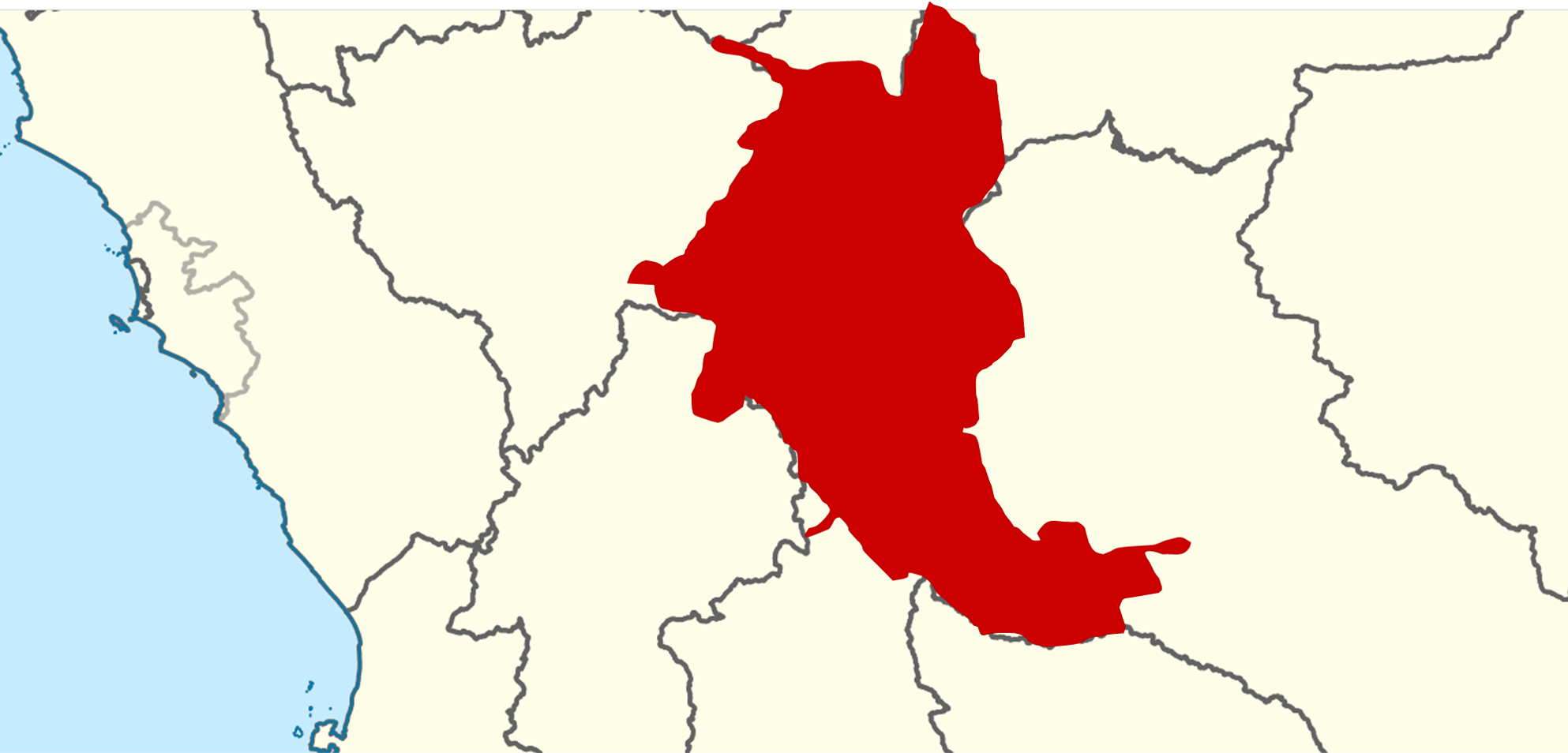
Map of the areas where they were active in 2023

== See also ==
- Internal conflict in Peru
- Túpac Amaru Revolutionary Movement
- List of anti-revisionist groups
