= Centro de Reclusión de Máxima Seguridad =

Maximum security prison in Peru

- Interactive map of Centro de Reclusión de Máxima Seguridad
- Location: Callao, Peru; 12°01′44.8″S 77°08′25.0″W
- Opened: 1992
- Managed by: Navy of Peru

The Centro de Reclusión de Máxima Seguridad (CEREC) is a maximum security prison located in Callao at the Callao Naval Base and is one of the most monitored facilities in Peru, holding some of the main members of Shining Path and MRTA.

== Detainees ==
Abimael Guzmán	The Shining Path leader served a life sentence at Naval Base until his death on September 11, 2021.
Antauro Humala	The ethnocacerist leader who attacked and occupied a police station in Andahuaylas, Apurimac, resulting with the death of officers.
Víctor Polay Campos	He was the founder of the MRTA who is serving a 32-year prison sentence that culminates in 2023.
Óscar Ramírez Durand	After Abimael Guzmán announced a "peace treaty" in 1993, 'Feliciano' assumed command of the Shining Path and moved to the VRAE. He is serving a 24-year sentence and will be released from prison in 2023.
Vladimiro Montesinos	Former Presidential Advisor to Alberto Fujimori and former de facto head of SIN. He was transferred to Ancon II prison in August 2021 after making landline phone calls in an attempt to influence the 2021 Peruvian general election.
Miguel Rincon "Alias Francisco"	He was a leader of the MRTA. He is serving a 32-year prison sentence and will leave the Naval Base in 2027.
Wilmer Arrieta	Rodolfo Orellana's partner is serving a sentence for belonging to the former lawyer's criminal organization.
Florindo Eleuterio Flores Hala	He was one of the leaders of Shining Path and complied with Cadena Perpetua.
