= Jorge Quispe Palomino =

Peruvian terrorist (1970–2021)

Jorge Quispe
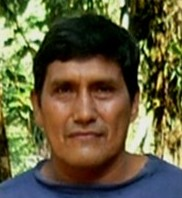
- Born: 2 November 1958; Umaru, Ayacucho, Peru
- Died: 27 January 2021 (aged 62); VRAEM region, Peru
- Relatives: Víctor Quispe (brother)
- Military career
- Allegiance: MPCP (1999–2021); Shining Path (1980–1999)
- Service years: 1980–2021
- Nickname: Comrade Raúl
- Conflicts: Internal conflict in Peru

Jorge Quispe Palomino (November 2, 1958 — January 27, 2021), also known as Comrade Raúl, was a Peruvian member of the Shining Path and later member of the central committee of the Militarized Communist Party of Peru (MPCP) until his death in 2021.

== Biography ==
Quispe was born on November 2, 1958, in Umaru, a town in Vischongo District. In 1980, his family joined the Shining Path in its "armed fight" against the Peruvian government, with siblings José, Eloy, Martín, Laura, and Eloysa being eventually killed in action. His father, Martín Quispe Mendoza, was killed in Tsomaveni, San Martín de Pangoa, in August 1993.

Following Abimael Guzmán's capture in 1992, the Quispe Palomino siblings opposed the leadership of Óscar Ramírez, collaborating with the authorities of the National Intelligence Service in its capture in 1999, after which they continued to operate as leaders of their own faction, later known as the Militarized Communist Party of Peru.

Quispe opened a YouTube channel in 2009, through which he uploaded speeches and music, which led to concern among the press.

In 2021, it was reported that Quispe died of a preexisting chronic kidney condition. Pamphlets distributed by his brother in the VRAEM region confirmed his death.

== See also ==
- Comrade José
