= Operation Chameleon (Peru) =

2013 Peruvian anti-Shining Path operation

Operation Camaleón
- Part of the Internal conflict in Peru
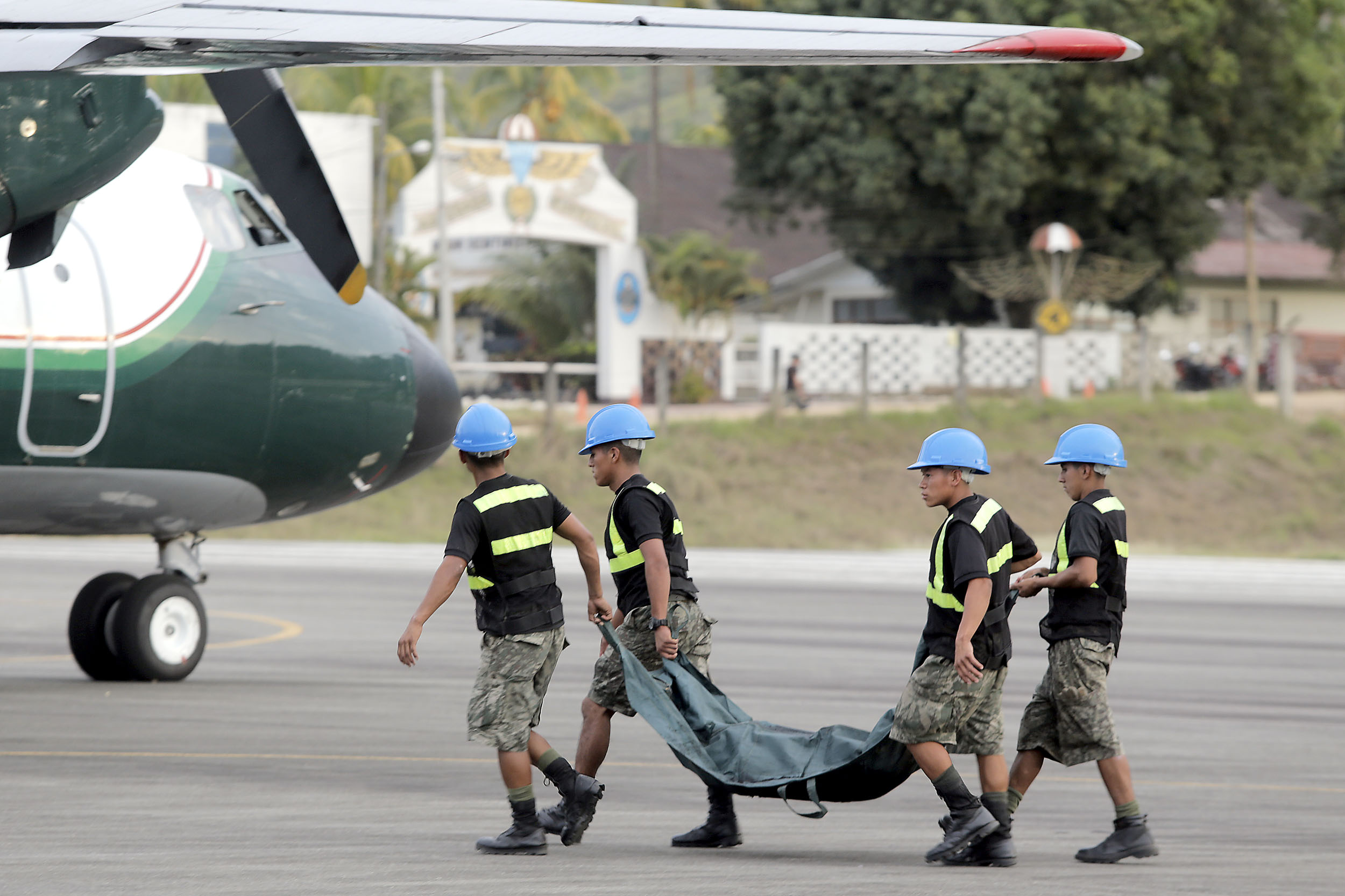
- The bodies of "Alipio" and "Gabriel" in Mazamari
Date	August 11, 2013
Location	Llochegua District, Ayacucho, Peru
Result	Successful operation; Establishment of the MPCP and break with Gonzalo Thought.

Belligerents
Peruvian Army; Peruvian Police	Shining Path

Commanders and leaders
Unknown	Comrade Alipio †; Comrade Gabriel †; Comrade Alfonso †

Strength
1 brigade	3 terrorists

Casualties and losses
None	3 killed

Operation Chameleon (Spanish: Operación Camaleón) was an anti-terrorist operation carried out on August 11, 2013, by the Peruvian Armed Forces and the Peruvian National Police that resulted in the death of Alejandro Borda Casafranca (Comrade Alipio), number two of the remnants of the Shining Path and Martín Antonio Quispe Palomino (Comrade Gabriel).

== Background ==
Shining Path member Alejandro Borda Casafranca ("Comrade Alipio") had joined Martín Antonio Quispe Palomino ("Comrade Gabriel") in La Concepción (Cuzco) to kidnap 36 workers of the Camisea Gas Project in April 2012. After "Comrade William" was killed in action and the desertion of some of the group's members, Alipio headed for Llochegua District alongside Gabriel and 30 other men with the intent of recapturing the area.

On June 5, 2013, the group broke into the a camp belonging to the Consorcio Vial Quinua, where 12,000 sticks of dynamite were stolen in response to a police raid on an arsenal in Junín. After a few weeks, a radio link intercepted by the Police's Anti-Drug Directorate (DIRANDRO) between Alejandro Borda Casafranca ("Comrade Alipio") and a local drug trafficker revealed that "Comrade Alipio" would "soon arrive in Llochegua" alongside Gabriel, meeting him at his house after he attracted them with the suggestion of inviting some women. In reality, the drug trafficker was an informant recruited by the National Directorate of Intelligence (DINI), working under the Anti-Terrorism Directorate (DIRCOTE).

== Operation ==
The members of a brigade (sometimes called the "Lobo Command"), formed by members of the Police's DIRCOTE and DIRANDRO, and the Army's Joint Special Command and VRAEM Special Command, organised themselves to wait for Shining Path commander ("Comrade Alipio"). On August 11, "Comrade Alipio", "Comrade Gabriel" and the lower-rank member known as "Comrade Alfonso" scattered their men and entered the drug trafficker's house. At 9:30 pm an explosion was heard as the drug trafficker fled. Three charred corpses were found in the house. The bodies were identified by some Shining Path deserters.

== Aftermath ==
The death of "Comrade Gabriel" and "Comrade Alipio" would bring about the restructuring of the subversive organization, which would lead to the official formation of the Militarized Communist Party of Peru (MPCP) and the break with Pensamiento Gonzalo.

== See also ==
- Militarized Communist Party of Peru
- Internal conflict in Peru
