= Comrade Alipio =

Shining Path commander

Orlando Alejandro Borda Casafranco
- Nickname: Comrade Alipio
- Born: January 11, 1967; San José de Secce, Peru
- Died: August 11, 2013 (aged 46) Pampas, Ayacucho, Peru
- Allegiance: MPCP
- Conflicts: Internal conflict in Peru; 1983 Lucanamarca massacre; Operation Camaleón †

Orlando Alejandro Borda Casafranca (January 11, 1967 − August 11, 2013), who used the nom de guerre Comrade Alipio, was a Shining Path commander and one of the highest-ranking members of the Shining Path. He was killed on 11 August 2013 in a Peruvian Army operation in Llochegua.

== See also ==
- Operation Victoria
