= Vladimiro Montesinos =

Peruvian former intelligence officer and lawyer (born 1945)

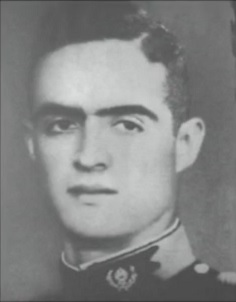
- Military portrait of Montesinos (c. 1970s)

Chief of the National Intelligence Service
- De facto 28 July 1990 – 3 October 2000
- President: Alberto Fujimori
- Preceded by: Edwin Díaz Zevallos (de jure)
- Succeeded by: Luis Rodríguez Silva (de jure)

National Security Advisor and Chief Advisor to the President of Peru
- In office 28 July 1990 – 3 October 2000
- President: Alberto Fujimori

Personal details
- Born: Vladimiro Lenin Ilich Montesinos Torres; 20 May 1945 (age 81) Arequipa, Peru
- Party: Cambio 90 (1990–2001); New Majority (1992–2001); For Love of Peru (2025–2026)
- Other political affiliations: Peru 2000 (1999–2001); Alliance for the Future (2005–2010)
- Spouse: Trinidad Becerra (m. 1973; div. 2001)
- Children: 3
- Relatives: Jorge Nieto (nephew)
- Education: School of the Americas; Chorrillos Military School
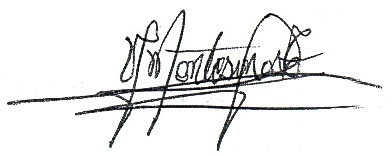
- Signature

Military service
- Allegiance: Peru
- Branch/service: Peruvian Army
- Years of service: 1966–1976
- Rank: Captain

Vladimiro Lenin Ilich Montesinos Torres (Spanish pronunciation: [bla.ð̞iˌmi.ɾo ˌle.nĩn iˌlit͡ʃ mõn̪.t̪eˌsi.nos ˈt̪o.res]; born 20 May 1945) is a Peruvian former intelligence officer and lawyer who served as the head of Peru's National Intelligence Service (SIN) during the presidency of Alberto Fujimori. Montesinos, supported by the Peruvian Armed Forces, was widely regarded as the power behind the throne in Fujimori's government.

Montesinos' career was marked by his deep connections with the U.S. Central Intelligence Agency (CIA), through which he received substantial funding ostensibly for anti-terrorism efforts. His tenure saw numerous human rights abuses and corruption scandals. The "Vladi-videos," secretly recorded tapes showing Montesinos bribing officials, led to a national scandal in 2000. This exposure forced him to flee Peru and precipitated Fujimori's resignation.

Investigations unveiled Montesinos' involvement in a wide range of illegal activities, including embezzlement, drug trafficking, and orchestrating extrajudicial killings. He was subsequently captured, tried, and convicted on multiple charges. Despite his imprisonment, Montesinos continued to influence Peruvian politics and sought to protect allies within the Fujimorist faction, including Keiko Fujimori.

Montesinos' early life was influenced by his communist parents and his cousin, a leader of the Shining Path guerrilla group. He received military training in the U.S. and Peru, later becoming involved in intelligence and political advisory roles. His legal career, following a brief imprisonment for espionage, was marred by fraudulent activities and associations with drug traffickers.

== Early years and education ==
Vladimiro Montesinos was born in the city of Arequipa on May 20, 1945, at Goyeneche State Hospital, the first of five children. His parents were devout communists of Greek origin and named their son after Vladimir Lenin. The family lived in Yanahuara District, at a home traditionally known as La Casa Encantada. Montesinos is a grandson of painter Guillermo Montesinos Pastor (1877–1925), and a cousin of the incarcerated communist leader Óscar Ramírez Durand, a.k.a. "Feliciano", the leader of the Shining Path. In 1965, Montesinos graduated as a military cadet at the U.S. Army's School of the Americas in Panama. A year later, he graduated from the Chorrillos Military School in Lima, Peru.

Montesinos met his future wife, María Trinidad Becerra, at a classroom during a public relations course given by the Pontifical Catholic University of Peru in the late 1960s, located at its campus in what had been the Fundo Pando. Montesinos was then an army lieutenant and Becerra was a history teacher. The couple married on March 9, 1973, at San Antonio de Padua, a church in Jesús María. At the time, Montesinos was an assistant of general Luis Edgardo Mercado Jarrín, who was the wedding's best man. The religious ceremony was preceded by a civil one two days earlier in San Isidro. The couple had two daughters, Silvana (b. c. 1975), and Samantha Elsa (b. c. 1984). Additionally, Montesinos had another daughter with lawyer Grace Mary Riggs Brousseau, his cousin's wife, named Stefani.

== Career ==
=== Military career ===
==== Aide to prime ministers ====
In 1973, during the Revolutionary Government of the Armed Forces of Peru's leftist military junta of General Juan Velasco Alvarado, Montesinos became an artillery captain in the Peruvian army and was appointed to the role of aide to General Edgardo Mercado Jarrín, who served as both Prime Minister and Chief of the Armed Forces. While working with Jarrín, Montesinos travelled with the prime minister to Algeria, Colombia, Cuba, France, Spain and Venezuela. While visiting Cuba, he stayed with Raúl Castro as a personal guest. The Armed Forces Movement of Portugal had also reportedly been in contact with Montesinos. He visited several foreign institutions as an official representative of the Peruvian army, also without authorization.

When the Velasco government fell in 1975, Montesinos was able to maintain his position in the military during the more conservative government of General Francisco Morales-Bermúdez. He would also serve as an aide for prime ministers Guillermo Arbulú Galliani and Jorge Fernández Maldonado Solari during the government of Francisco Morales Bermúdez. A talented writer, Montesinos wrote many of the speeches for ministers of the government and was a frequent contributor to newspapers. He was also reportedly writing various treatises regarding an invasion of Chile and granting Bolivia access to the Pacific Ocean.

==== CIA contact ====
International Visitor Leadership Program nomination for Montesinos, sent by the Embassy of the United States, Lima

In 1974, political scientist Alfred Stepan of Yale University recommended to the Embassy of the United States, Lima that Montesinos be given the International Visitor's Leader Grant, describing him as the "most theoretically sophisticated of young military officers in national security doctrine" and that he had "considerable leadership potential". Montesinos expressed during the nomination process that he wanted to meet with officials of the Central Intelligence Agency (CIA) and the United States National Security Council of President Gerald Ford to discuss military and economic relations. He also specified to US officials that he did not want to "waste time" going to tourist destinations such as Walt Disney World. The United States Department of State and the CIA then began its relationship with Montesinos.

From 5 to 21 September 1976, Montesinos travelled to Washington, D.C. paid for by the United States government, meeting with multiple US officials; Robert Hawkins of the CIA's Office of Current Intelligence, Luigi R. Einaudi, policy-planning chief of the US State Department's Latin America division, Alfred Stepan of Yale University, Albert Fishlow of University of California, Berkeley, Riordan Roett of Johns Hopkins University and Abraham Lowenthal of the University of Southern California were documented to have met with Montesinos. Such trips for foreign individuals provided by the United States were rare at the time and were only reserved for high-value recruits destined to carry out US interests.

Upon his return to Lima, he was arrested for having failed to obtain formal government permission to make the trip. In 1977, Major José Fernández Salvatteci of the Army Intelligence Service (Spanish: Servicio de Inteligencia del Ejército (SIE)) charged Montesinos with the crimes of spying and treason, accusing him of delivering military documents to the embassy of the United States in Lima. The documents included a list of weapons which Peru had purchased from the Soviet Union. The subsequent investigation revealed that top-secret documents had been found in his possession, and that he had photographed them and given copies to the CIA. Montesinos had travelled to the U.S. without authorization from army command, and had forged military documents to allow him to complete the trip without being detained.

Montesinos was dishonorably discharged from the military and sentenced two years in the military prison at Bolivar Barracks in Pueblo Libre. This was a far less severe sentence than the customary death penalty that was the punishment for traitors during the military regime. United States Ambassador to Peru Robert William Dean contacted Minister of Foreign Affairs of Peru José de la Puente Radbill to pressure for Montesinos' release while the attorney representing the imprisoned army captain was asked to contact Einaudi. General Mercado then ordered the charges be dropped.

Years later, declassified US State Department documents revealed the reason for the CIA's interest in Montesinos. In the 1970s, Peru was governed by one of the few left-wing regimes in South America, a continent dominated by right-wing governments. Locked in the Cold War with the Soviet Union and fearing its influence in the region, as well as that of the Communist government of Cuba, the US was seeking information about activities in Peru. Montesinos conjured up and told a story about potential attacks against Peru's southern rival, Chile, then ruled by dictator Augusto Pinochet, an ally of the U.S.

=== Attorney career ===
In February 1978, Montesinos was freed after two years in jail. He was given work by his cousin Sergio Cardenal Montesinos, a lawyer who persuaded him to pursue a degree in law. In April of the same year, Montesinos applied to the National University of San Marcos in Lima. He received his law diploma only three months later, through fraudulent means. Book No. 24 of the University of San Marcos Office of Records, where Montesinos' graduation would be noted, has disappeared from the Office. Montesinos' undergraduate thesis and other materials related to his academic record have never been produced.

On 15 August 1978, Montesinos used his degree to register as a lawyer with the Superior Court of Lima. Ten days later, on 25 August 1978, he became a member of the Lima bar association. He became notorious for representing a number of Colombian and Peruvian members of the illegal drug trade, as well as police officers accused of being involved in drug trafficking. Between 1978 and 1979, he represented Colombian drug lords Evaristo "Papá Doc" Porras Ardila and Jaime Tamayo. In addition, he acted as guarantor on Tamayo's lease of several offices and warehouses used to manufacture cocaine.

Between 1980 and 1983, Montesinos revealed sensitive information related to military wiretapping and assassinations to the newspaper Kausachum, run by Augusto Zimmerman, ex-spokesperson of deposed president Juan Velasco Alvarado. General Carlos Briceño, the Commander of the Peruvian Army, re-opened the investigation into Montesinos' alleged treason. Montesinos fled to Ecuador, where in 1984 he revealed information to the Ecuadorian Army about Peru's military weapons purchases. The investigation was closed that year in order to "protect institutional image", and Montesinos was allowed to return to Peru.

== Leadership ==
=== Plan Verde ===
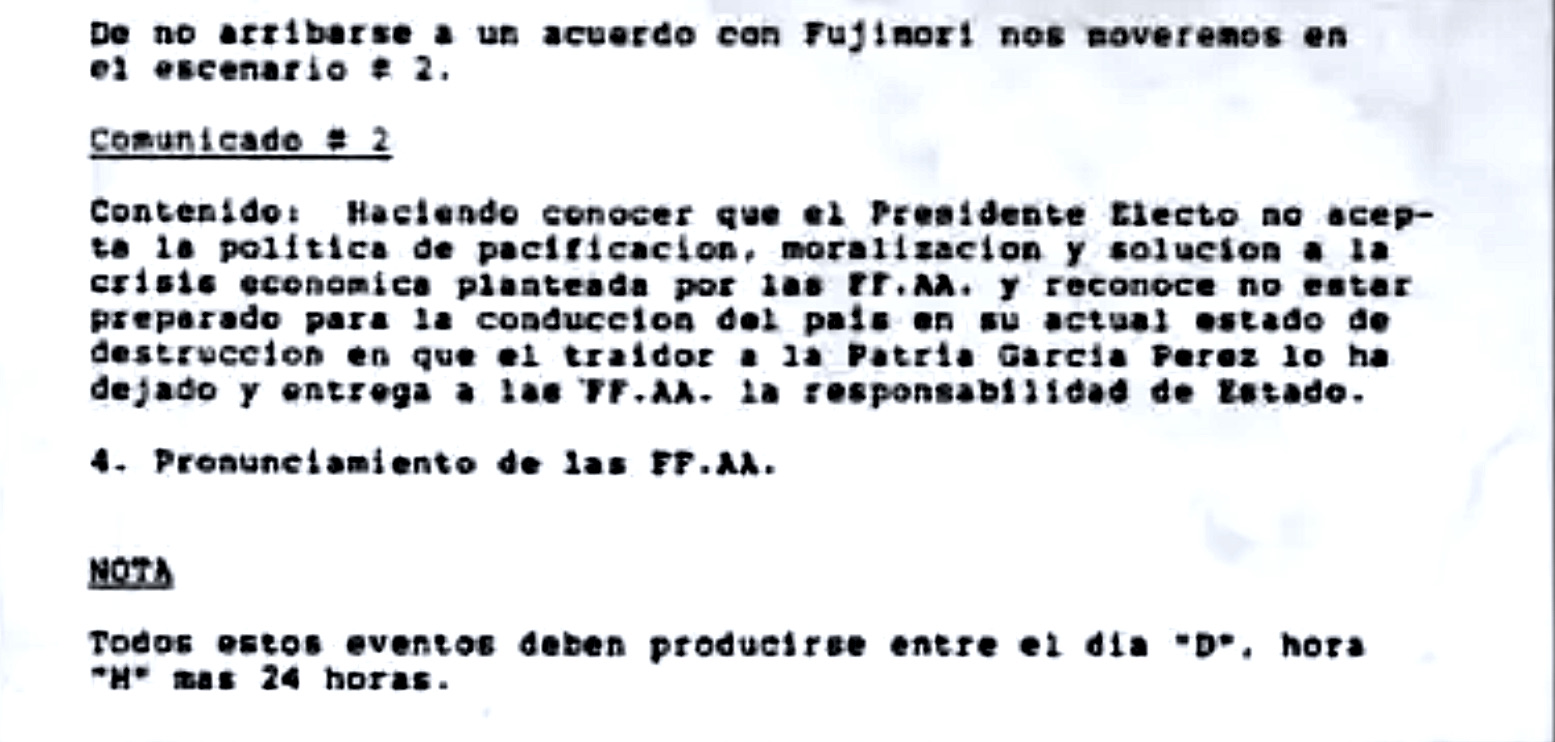
Portion of the Final Coordination Sheet addendum of Plan Verde drafted following the election of Alberto Fujimori

During his attorney career, Montesinos was hired by Susana Higuchi, the wife of engineer Alberto Fujimori, assisting Higuchi after she made controversial deals in real estate. The paperwork in the case disappeared and the charges were dropped. This began the relationship between Montesinos and Fujimori.

Peruvian journalist Gustavo Gorriti reported that Montesinos allegedly used $1 million provided by Pablo Escobar to fund the presidential campaign for Fujimori in the 1990 Peruvian general election to enter as a dark horse candidate. In addition, evidence exists that Montesinos reportedly forged tax documents and the birth certificate of Fujimori according to the Harvard International Review. Prior to the election, the Peruvian Armed Forces created Plan Verde, a clandestine military operation developed during the internal conflict in Peru that involved the genocide of impoverished and indigenous Peruvians, the control or censorship of media in the nation and the establishment of a neoliberal economy controlled by a military junta in Peru. The military decided against committing a coup as initially outlined in Plan Verde as they expected Mario Vargas Llosa, a neoliberal candidate, to be elected in the 1990 election. According to Fernando Rospigliosi, Montesinos was not initially involved with Plan Verde, but his ability to resolve issues for the military resulted in the armed forces tasking him with implementing the plan with Fujimori, while Alfredo Schulte-Bockholt would say that both General Nicolás de Bari Hermoza and Montesinos were responsible for the relationship between the armed forces and Fujimori.

Peruvian political analyst Umberto Jara would describe the relationship Montesinos had between the military and Fujimori:

[Montesinos was] the nexus capable of uniting two weaknesses: an army that had lost its prestige because of subversion and human rights violations, and a political unknown, absolutely solitary, without a political organization or a social base.

Mario Vargas Llosa later reported that United States Ambassador to Peru, Anthony C. E. Quainton, personally told him that allegedly leaked documents of the CIA purportedly being supportive of Fujimori's candidacy were authentic. Rendón writes that the United States supported Fujimori because of his relationship with Montesinos.

Fujimori's campaign exploited the popular distrust of the existing Peruvian political establishment and the uncertainty about the proposed neoliberal economic reforms of his opponent Vargas Llosa. Fujimori would win the election, and according to Oiga, the armed forces finalized plans on 18 June 1990 involving multiple scenarios for a coup to be executed on 27 July 1990, the day prior to Fujimori's inauguration. The magazine noted that in one of the scenarios, titled "Negotiation and agreement with Fujimori. Bases of negotiation: concept of directed Democracy and Market Economy", Fujimori was to be directed on accepting the military's plan at least twenty-four hours before his inauguration. Rospigliosi writes that head of the National Intelligence Service (SIN), General Edwin “Cucharita” Díaz, beside Montesinos also played a key role with making Fujimori abide by the military's demands. Díaz and Montesinos allegedly convinced Fujimori that he was being targeted by the Túpac Amaru Revolutionary Movement and made Fujimori stay at the Círculo Militar, limiting his access to only military officials. Rospigliosi states "an understanding was established between Fujimori, Montesinos and some of the military officers" involved in Plan Verde prior to Fujimori's inauguration. Montesinos and SIN officials would ultimately assume the armed force's position in the plan, placing SIN operatives into military leadership roles.

After Fujimori won the presidential election on 28 July 1990, Montesinos became his chief advisor and the de facto head of the SIN. Fujimori would go on to adopt many of the policies outlined in Plan Verde. Just days after Fujimori took office, the United States shared concerns in diplomatic cables that paramilitary death squads had been created by Montesinos. The Drug Enforcement Administration (DEA), according to documents, believed in 1990 that Montesinos effectively ruled Peru through the SIN. Former Peruvian generals and commanders also reported to the United States that Montesinos controlled Fujimori. Montesinos then reportedly made Fujimori nominate former artillery officers to head key sectors of civilian and military posts, including the Ministry of Defense and the Ministry of Interior, effectively giving Montesinos control of Peru's military. In a statement to a colleague at the time, Montesinos would remark "[Fujimori] is completely malleable: he does nothing at all without me knowing".

=== Relationship with the United States ===
United States Army Intelligence and Threat Analysis Center document from 1990 detailing Montesinos' control of Fujimori, titled Who is Controlling Whom?

While leading the SIN through the 1990s, Montesinos served the interests of the United States on multiple occasions according to the Harvard International Review. The United States reportedly supported Fujimori's candidacy in the 1990 elections due to Montesinos' ties. The United States reportedly maintained a relationship with Montesinos as a way to have direct influence in Peru; the SIN head would clear bureaucratic obstacles and would immediately implement the recommendations of the CIA. During his years with Fujimori, Montesinos was said to be paid $1 million annually by the CIA from 1990 to 2000, according to US officials, while the CIA and the DEA defended him from allegations of misconduct. In a 1998 letter from the CIA chief in Lima sent to Montesinos, the American official would admire Montesinos' "leadership, dedication, and professionalism".

Montesinos had strong connections with the U.S. Central Intelligence Agency (CIA) for over 25 years and was said to have received $10 million from the agency for his government's anti-terrorist activities, with international bank accounts possessed by Montesinos reportedly holding at least $270 million.

Montesinos was directly involved with assisting American businesses establish deals in Peru, mediating US-led drug enforcement efforts in the Peruvian army and air force and obtaining money for US antinarcotics missions in Peru upon demand. One of his largest accomplishments for the United States was granting majority mining rights of the Yanacocha mine – the fourth largest gold mine in the world – to the US-based Newmont. French mining company Bureau de Recherches Géologiques et Minières discovered the Yanacocha, though Newmont sought majority rights to access the mine, raising a judicial dispute between the two. US Ambassador to Peru Dennis Jett told the Fujimori government that "any appearance of succumbing to French pressure would feed rumors of corruption in the Peruvian judicial system and thus scare off international investors", with Montesinos later telling a supreme court judge tasked with decision that if the decision was not in favor with Newmont, then the United States would not support Peru's territorial dispute with Ecuador from the Cenepa War. The Supreme Court ultimately decided 4-3 in favor of granting the rights to Newmont.

=== Political repression ===
The DEA documented in December 1990, that Montesinos utilized illegal surveillance acts both domestically and internationally.

Montesinos is widely accused of threatening or harassing Fujimori's political opponents. Evidence proves that he supervised a death squad known as the Grupo Colina, part of the National Intelligence Service, which was thought to have been responsible for the Barrios Altos massacre and the La Cantuta massacre, actions intended to repress the Shining Path (Sendero Luminoso), the major communist insurgency movement that had been operating since the 1980s, but only resulted in the execution of civilians. Montesinos avoided large-scale violence against opponents, saying he wanted to avoid performing "clumsy" acts that occurred under Chilean president Augusto Pinochet. Violence instead targeted peasants and students, avoiding prominent individuals in order to remain covert.

Four officers who were tortured during interrogation after plotting a coup d'état against Fujimori in November 1992 later stated that Montesinos took an active part in torturing them. On 16 March 1998, former Peruvian Army Intelligence Agent Luisa Zanatta accused Montesinos of ordering illegal wiretaps of leading politicians and journalists. Zanatta also said that army intelligence agents had killed fellow agent Mariella Barreto Riofano because she gave a magazine information about human rights violations, as well as the location of bodies from the La Cantuta massacre. Zanatta said that in early 1997, Barreto had told her that she was part of the Grupo Colina death squad responsible for the La Cantuta massacre. Barreto's dismembered body was found by a roadside on 29 March 1997, and showed evidence of torture before death and mutilation.

=== Control of the media ===
The addiction to information is like the addiction to drugs. We live on information. I need information.

— Vladimiro Montesinos

During the Fujimori years, Montesinos gained extensive control over the Peruvian media by bribing television channel executives in an effort to know and control all information within Peru. Bribes ranged from approximately US$500,000 per month to Channels 2 and 5 to $1.5 million per month to Channel 4. In total, Montesinos paid more than US$3 million per month in bribes to Peruvian television channels.

Montesinos funneled additional funds to the television channels through government advertising. From 1997 to 1999, the Peruvian government increased their advertising budget by 52%, becoming Peru's largest advertiser. Ultimately, Montesinos held editorial control over Peru's free-to-air television networks: Frecuencia Latina, América Televisión, Panamericana Televisión, ATV, and Red Global.

To maintain this control he structured bribe payments in monthly installments, limiting the risk of defection by the TV channel owners. He also ensured continued cooperation through blackmail, utilizing video evidence of sexual indiscretions by bribe recipients. To keep track of the numerous bribes and gain further evidence of the owners' complicity, which could also be used as blackmail, Montesinos filmed monetary exchanges and forced channel executives to sign contracts stipulating the extent of influence he expected in return for the stated monetary bribe.

The Fujimori government also controlled the content of Channel 7, Televisión Nacional de Peru, which was explicitly state owned. Canal N, remained the only independent television channel, funded entirely by monthly service fees. Montesinos did not bribe Canal N because of their low viewership, numbering in the tens of thousands, which was a result of the unaffordability of the monthly fees for most Peruvians. This proved to be a costly mistake, as Canal N was the first network to air the Kouri videotape, which exposed the extent of Montesinos's corruption.

On 14 July 1997, the government legally stripped Baruch Ivcher, a native Israeli, of his Peruvian nationality for supposed offenses against the government. In September, control of Channel 2 was given to minority shareholders more sympathetic to the government. In response, former United Nations Secretary-General Javier Pérez de Cuéllar said, "Peru is no longer a democracy. We are now a country headed by an authoritarian regime."

=== 2000 elections ===
The 2000 presidential elections, which followed years of political violence, was controversial. A journalist claimed to have a videotape of Montesinos bribing election officials to fix the vote. The journalist claimed to have been kidnapped by secret police agents, who sawed his arm to the bone to get him to give up the tape. In view of such tactics, the Clinton administration threatened briefly not to recognize Fujimori's victory. It backed off from this threat, and pressured Fujimori's government to take action to root out abuses, including ousting Montesinos.

Continuing political unrest in Peru would have represented a serious problem as US operations against the FARC in Colombia got under way. Peru was needed as a base of operations and a defensive backstop against guerrillas based in Colombia's south, not far from the Peruvian border.

=== Drug trafficking allegations ===
The DEA was aware of reports in August 1990 that Montesinos was involved with being paid for the immunity of drug traffickers.

Allegations circulated that Montesinos and General Nicolás Hermoza Ríos, the chairman of Peru's joint chiefs of staff, were taking protection money from drug traffickers. Documents that were later declassified by the US government showed that by 1996 the Drug Enforcement Administration (DEA) was aware of the allegations. Despite evidence that Montesinos was in business with Colombian narco-traffickers, the CIA paid Montesinos's intelligence organization $1 million a year for 10 years to fight drug trafficking.

One of the most notorious scandals during this period was the 11 May 1996 seizure of 169–176 kg of cocaine (the quantity depends on the source) aboard a Peruvian Air Force Douglas DC-8 (frequently confused in the media as the presidential Boeing 737 as it had operated on this role until the acquisition of the Boeing) that was about to depart on a mission to Russia (with stopovers at the Canary Islands and Bordeaux), carrying military aviation equipment for maintenance. The scandal remains a mystery to this day because the drug's origin and destiny were never determined and the investigations were compromised by Fujimori's corrupt government and possibly Montesinos himself. A 2011 investigation revealed that some four drug shipments were made abroad, with Miami listed as a destination, in air force planes during 1993–1994. Only the material authors (several low-ranking officers) were processed, acquitted and publicly defended by Fujimori in late 1997 (amongst them Fujimori's aide-de-camp who was part of the plane's crew).

Peruvian drug kingpin Demetrio Chávez Peñaherrera, known as "El Vaticano", testified that Montesinos was a protector of drug trafficking. During a trial audience on 16 August 1996, Chávez Peñaherrera stated that he had bribed members of the Peruvian Armed Forces and Montesinos himself, as the effective chief of the Peruvian Intelligence Service (SIN), to be able to operate freely in Campanilla, a jungle area of the Huallaga region (where he operated an illegal airstrip). Recordings of radio communications presented during the trial showed that members of the army had let Chávez's organization operate freely in the Huallaga region in exchange for bribes. During a later appearance in court, Chávez appeared tortured and drugged, evidenced by his incoherent speaking. After sentencing, while in prison, Chávez talked to the press and revealed that Montesinos said to him at one point that he "did some work" with Pablo Escobar, leader of the Medellín Cartel.

Montesinos was paid US$50,000 a month during 1991 and 1992. As proof, the government presented recordings during Chávez's trial of radio communications between his drug traffickers and members of the Armed Forces attesting to bribery of Montesinos. In addition, Chávez said that retired general Nicolás de Bari Hermoza, the former chief of the Armed Forces Joint Command, and Fujimori had both complete knowledge of the illicit acts of Montesinos.

== Downfall ==
Frequently, Montesinos secretly videotaped himself bribing individuals in his office, incriminating politicians, officials and military officers. His downfall appears to have been precipitated by the discovery of a major illegal arms shipment. Arranged by guerrilla leader Tomás Medina Caracas, the arms were airlifted from Jordan via Peru, to the FARC insurgent guerrillas in southern Colombia.

Montesinos claimed the credit for uncovering the arms smuggling, which involved upwards of 10,000 Kalashnikov assault rifles. Jordan rejected the Peruvian version of events, insisting the shipments were legitimate government-to-government deals. Evidence emerged which pointed to Montesinos having orchestrated the gun-running operation rather than dismantling it. A senior Peruvian general was found to have participated in the deal, and another principal participant was a government contractor. He had signed at least eleven deals with the Fujimori regime, most of them to provide supplies to the Peruvian military.

According to one report, a group of military officers angered by Montesinos's apparent role in the arms deal broke into his offices and stole the video that was subsequently broadcast. Because of the arms deal, Montesinos lost the support of the US, which attached high strategic importance to crushing the FARC.

=== Vladi-videos ===
On 14 September 2000, Peruvian television broadcast a video of Montesinos bribing an opposition congressman, Alberto Kouri, to support Perú 2000, Fujimori's party. The video caused Fujimori's remaining support to collapse. He accepted the resignation of Montesinos and thanked him for his services. He then announced the dissolution of the National Intelligence Service (SIN) and new elections, in which he would not run. Shortly thereafter, Montesinos sought political asylum in Panama.

In following months, some of the most infamous "Vladi-videos" were released. One showed the owners of Channel 2 being offered US$500,000 a month to ban appearances of the political opposition on their channel. Another showed Channel 4 owners getting $1.5 million a month for similar cooperation. Others show Montesinos counting out $350,000 in cash to Channel 5's proprietor, and the owner of Channel 9 receiving $50,000 to cancel an investigative series called SIN censura (Uncensored). In June 2001, through the assistance of the U.S. Government, Montesinos was turned over to the Venezuelan government in Caracas and extradited back to Peru. Then his trial began.

== Trial ==
Montesinos was convicted of embezzlement, illegal assumption of his post as intelligence chief, abuse of power, influence peddling and bribery. Those charges carried sentences of between five and fifteen years each, but Peruvian prison sentences are served concurrently, so prosecutors continued to pursue him on additional charges. He was acquitted of two specific charges of corruption and conspiracy related to the mayor of Callao, whom he was alleged to have helped evade drug-trafficking charges. Montesinos was imprisoned at the Centro de Reclusión de Máxima Seguridad (CEREC) in Callao (which was built under his orders during the 1990s) and is serving 15 years in prison, but he will have to face at least 8 more trials in the next years. In total he was accused of sixty-three crimes that range from drug trafficking to murder.

On 29 January 2024, Montesinos pleaded guilty to charges of homicide, murder and forced disappearance in the 1992 killings of six farmers accused of being rebels in Pativilca, Lima Region, and was sentenced to 19 years' imprisonment.

== Imprisonment ==
In August 2004, U.S. officials returned to Peru $20 million in funds embezzled by Montesinos; it had been deposited in U.S. banks by two men working for him. Prime Minister Carlos Ferrero and other prosecutors believed that the total amount embezzled by Montesinos during his tenure at the National Intelligence Service surpassed one billion dollars, most of which was deposited in foreign banks.

In October 2004 Wilmer Yarleque Ordinola, 44, was apprehended in Virginia in the US and convicted of immigration fraud. He had been working as a construction laborer without papers. The Peruvian government sought his extradition as an alleged member of Montesino's Grupo Colina and responsible for 26-35 deaths or "disappearances" which the Truth and Reconciliation Commission (Peru) attributed to him. In October 2004 Yarleque was being held by the U.S. Marshals in Alexandria, Virginia. The suspect was initially granted a writ of habeas corpus, as he argued that he could not be extradited for political offenses committed for the government, but the United States Court of Appeals for the Fourth Circuit reversed that decision in 2005, opening the way for his extradition.

Montesinos was sentenced in September 2006 to a 20-year prison term for his direct involvement in an illegal arms deal to provide 10,000 assault weapons to Colombian rebels. Tribunal judges made their ruling based on evidence that placed Montesinos at the center of an intricate web of negotiations designed to transport assault rifles from Jordan to the Revolutionary Armed Forces of Colombia FARC.

In 2007 Montesinos was on trial for allegedly ordering the extra-judicial killings of the hostage-takers from the left-wing Túpac Amaru Revolutionary Movement (MRTA) during the 1997 Japanese embassy hostage crisis. The former chief of the armed forces, Nicolas de Bari Hermoza, and retired Colonel Roberto Huaman were also charged with ordering the extrajudicial execution of the 14 rebels. This action followed the government's commando raid in April to free the more than 70 diplomats who had been held hostage for more than four months in the Japanese embassy. The Peruvian special forces' recapture resulted in the deaths of one hostage, two commandos and all of the MRTA rebels. The former Japanese political attaché Hidetaka Ogura, one of the hostages freed from the Embassy, stated that he saw at least three of the MRTA rebels captured alive. Montesinos, Hermoza, and Huaman were acquitted of those charges in 2012, as the court found that a chain of command linking the accused to the killings had not been proven.

In August 2012 Montesinos and the former chief of the Peruvian Air Force, Waldo Richter, were acquitted of drug trafficking for the 1996 Air Force plane case. He had been implicated by a number of drug traffickers.

=== Vladi-audios ===
Following the 2021 Peruvian general election, audio recordings deemed Vladi-audios were leaked revealing that Montesinos was allegedly involved in at least 17 landline phone calls while imprisoned at the CEREC maximum security prison in an effort to prevent leftist presidential candidate Pedro Castillo from entering office and to protect Keiko Fujimori from being imprisoned. In one reported audio, Montesinos mentions a first plan to have Keiko Fujimori's husband go to the United States Embassy in Lima to present "documentation of the fraud" to the Bureau of Western Hemisphere Affairs and Central Intelligence Agency, with Montesinos allegedly saying he already contacted the embassy, that the documents would reach President Joe Biden and that his administration would condemn the election as interference from Cuba, Nicaragua, and Venezuela, subsequently giving Fujimori's claims of fraud more weight. In other reported audios, Montesinos suggests to retired military officer and Popular Force member Pedro Rejas Tataje on 10 June 2021 that they should bribe three electoral magistrates of the National Jury of Elections (JNE) – who were tasked with reviewing the narrow and controversial election – with one million dollars each, telling the former officer to contact attorney Guillermo Sendón who then reportedly made contact with JNE magistrate Luis Arce. The next day on 11 June, the JNE extended the deadline to file complaints to annul the election despite the maximum deadline already passing. Following the leak of the audios, Pedro Rejas Tataje released additional recording saying that he collected them as he believed that Montesinos was participating in illegal activities. Rejas would later explain that he believed Montesinos was directly involved with the campaign of Keiko Fujimori.

Right-wing politicians in Peru downplayed the audios of Montesinos. According to IDL-Reporteros, the Navy of Peru was involved in a "lie" when issuing their joint statement, saying that Montesinos was only involved in two phone calls, with IDL asking "How could you not notice the 17 calls and 12 conversations at CEREC, at the Naval Base of the institution with the greatest development in electronic intelligence within the Armed Forces?". The Ministry of Defense opened an investigation of the matter and on 25 August 2021, President Pedro Castillo announced that Montesinos had been transferred to the Ancon II prison to serve the remaining of his sentence while four officers were replaced at the naval prison.

== In popular culture ==
Montesinos was portrayed in the Peruvian film Caiga quien caiga. He also plays a significant part in Mario Vargas Llosa's novel Cinco Esquinas ("The Neighborhood").

== See also ==
- Plan Verde
