= Mochilero (drug courier) =

Mochileros (lit. 'backpackers') are drug couriers in the Latin American drug trade. They move drugs on foot from areas where it is produced, such as cocaine from the Valle de los Ríos Apurímac, Ene y Mantaro in Peru, to pick-up points from which it can be collected by the next link in the transport chain. The work is highly dangerous.

In Mexico, the people who engage in this type of activity are called "Burreros" (Spanish wordplay that refers to the person as a donkey, a pack animal), these people cross the border between Mexico and United States through the Sonoran Desert into Arizona. They usually trek through the desert in small groups, the journey taking more than a week to complete, each with a square-shaped package on their backs, containing around 55 pounds of illegal substances.
