= Young Pioneers (Peru) =

Youth group of the Communist Party of Peru-Shining Path

The Young Pioneers (Spanish: Los Pioneritos) was a name given to children born or residing within territories controlled by the Communist Party of Peru-Shining Path, a designated revolutionary group by the state of Peru. This name was also given to youth that were forced to be integrated into the revolutionary program during the course of the Shining Path's "people's war."

== Education and recruitment ==
These youth would often be trained into the political and military indoctrination of the party, in the anticipation to join the armed forces of the People's Guerrilla Army as necessary.

Pioneer children would typically begin education in revolutionary "people's schools" between the ages of 8 and 10, learning the Shining Path's ideological and cultural expectations for their new society, as well as various tactical maneuvers of escape in the case of government attack.

According to testimony published by the Truth and Reconciliation Commission:

"They didn't teach us to read or write, everything was verbal. Only they [the subversive commanders] had a notebook to be able to draw: they graphed how we should escape from the military, how to dodge bullets and all that."

At age 12, it's reported the pioneer children were taught the use of weapons. Young women had to wear braids and all were expected to wear clean clothes even if they were extremely impoverished. Pioneers were seen as a legitimate group to be used in warfare. For the Shining Path would:

Make children actively participate in the people's war so they can carry out various tasks through which they understand the need to transform the world... change their ideology and adopt that of the proletariat.

The Shining Path would threaten or massacre families that refused to hand over their children to the ideological training of the party. Throughout the internal conflict in Peru, groups such as the Túpac Amaru Revolutionary Movement (MRTA) and the Shining Path splinter Militarized Communist Party of Peru (MPCP) have been shown to use child soldiers.

== Etymology ==
The origin of "pioneer" children in the Shining Path comes from an inspiration of the Young Pioneer organization formed in the early Soviet Union for children up to the age of 14. This form of youth politicization would be repeated by the communist parties of the United States, East Germany, and China.

== See also ==
- Children in the military
- List of massacres in Peru
- Guerrilla warfare
- Pioneer movement
