= Ayahuanco District =

Coordinates: 12.5938°S 74.3313°W

Ayahuanco
- District
- Interactive map of Ayahuanco
- Country: Peru
- Region: Ayacucho
- Province: Huanta
- Founded: June 20, 1955
- Capital: Viracochan

Government
  - Mayor: Pablo Maldonado Quispe

Area
  - Total: 871.49 km^{2} (336.48 sq mi)
- Elevation: 3,414 m (11,201 ft)

Population (2005 census)
  - Total: 5,261
  - Density: 6.037/km^{2} (15.64/sq mi)
- Time zone: UTC-5 (PET)
- UBIGEO: 050402

Ayahuanco District is one of eight districts of the province Huanta in Peru.

== Ethnic groups ==
The people in the district are mainly indigenous citizens of Quechua descent. Quechua is the language which the majority of the population (95.94%) learnt to speak in childhood, 3.75% of the residents started speaking using the Spanish language (2007 Peru Census).
