= Gonzalo Thought =

Peruvian communist ideology

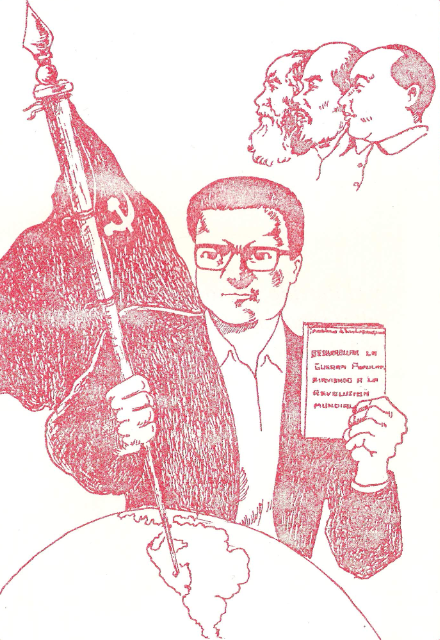
Abimael Guzmán, depicted as "The Fourth Sword of Marxism"

Gonzalo Thought (Spanish: Pensamiento Gonzalo), also known as Marxism–Leninism–Maoism–Gonzalo Thought and Gonzaloism, is an ideological doctrine developed by Peruvian revolutionary Abimael Guzmán (also known as Chairman Gonzalo) as an interpretation of Peruvian reality based on Marxism–Leninism–Maoism.

Anti-revisionist in nature, Gonzalo Thought was the ideological basis of the Communist Party of Peru—Shining Path (PCP-SL) and the trigger for the Peruvian Civil War of 1980–2000. The ideology is based on the synthesized philosophies of Karl Marx, Vladimir Lenin, Mao Zedong, and José Carlos Mariátegui. The term "Gonzalo Thought" comes from the alias used by Abimael Guzmán, "Chairman Gonzalo", who was considered by his followers to be the "Fourth Sword of Marxism", a direct successor to Marx, Lenin, and Mao.

Although initially raised from the Peruvian reality through a Marxist analysis, Gonzalo Thought expanded to culture, society and language outside Peru and formed the ideological basis of revolutionary groups abroad.

Its adherents put it into practice on their way to implement the People's Republic of New Democracy through the doctrine of "protracted people's war", often entailing terrorist actions and guerilla warfare.

After the capture of Abimael Guzmán in 1992, various currents claimed to maintain Gonzalo Thought (among them Sendero Rojo or the MOVADEF) while other Sendero leaders, such as Comrade José (Víctor Quispe Palomino), renounced Gonzalo Thought altogether and adopted other ideological lines or simply turned to drug trafficking.

Guzmán first began speaking of "Gonzalo Thought" as the party's guiding ideology in the late 1980s.

== Influences ==
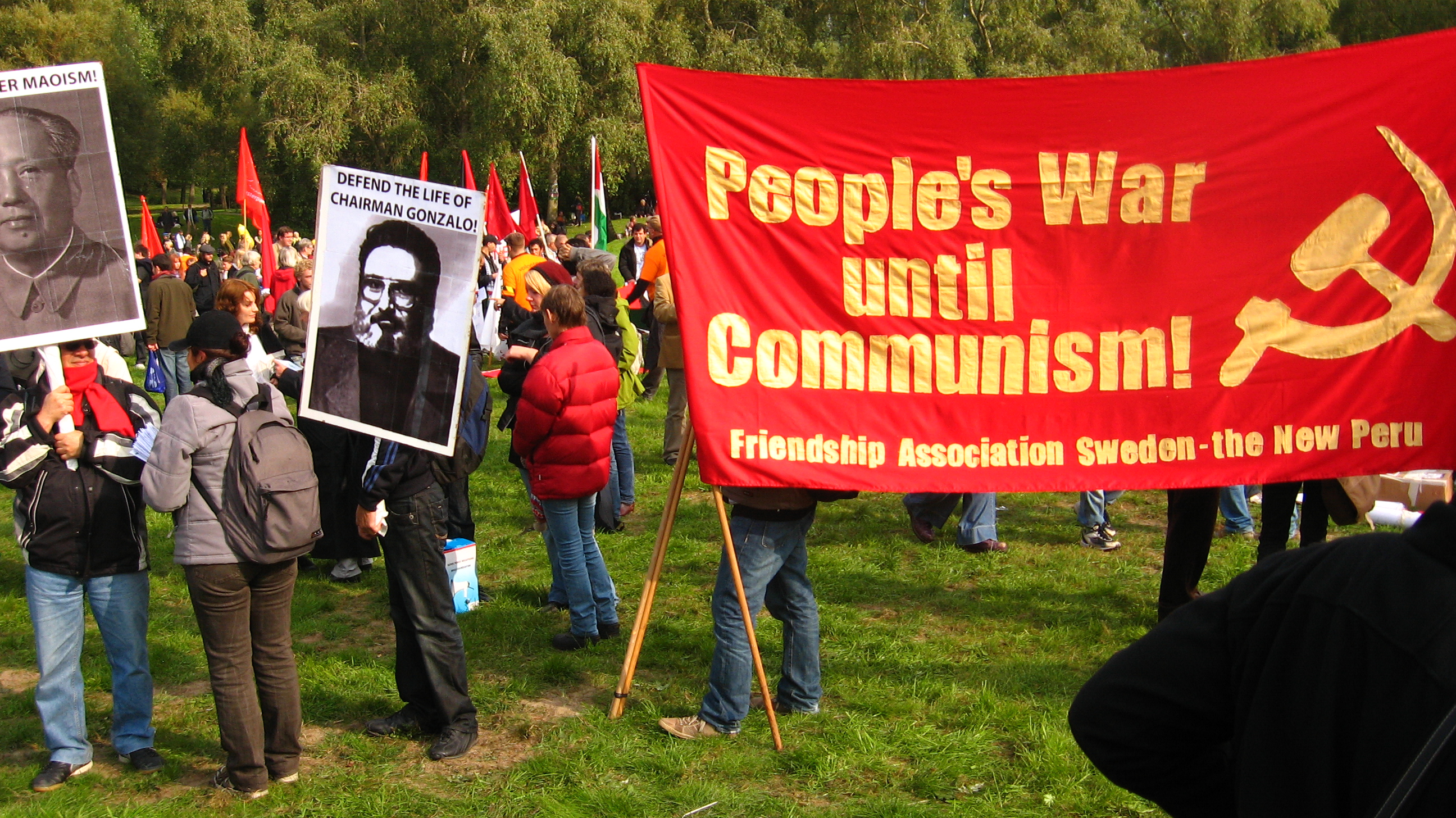
Protesters of the Asociación de Amistad - Nuevo Perú in Denmark, an organization that promotes Gonzalo Thought internationally.

The figures who inspired Abimael Guzmán were Marx, Engels, Lenin, Stalin, Mao and José Carlos Mariátegui, as well as the academic Efraín Morote Best (folklorist and father of the senderista Osmán Morote Barrionuevo), who was rector at the National University of San Cristóbal de Huamanga (UNSCH) in Ayacucho.

Gonzalo Thought was first called "Guiding Thought of Comrade Gonzalo", then "Guiding Thought of President Gonzalo" and, after the celebration of the First Congress of the Shining Path (between 1988 and 1989), it would become "Gonzalo Thought".

The bases of Gonzalo Thought are:

- Marxism, from which he interprets the class struggle and the dictatorship of the proletariat as realities of the world. Therefore, the revolution in a certain place had to be part of the proletarian world revolution, to which it had to belong and support. In addition to the belief in the inevitability of the revolutionary transition that would take human societies from capitalism to communism.
- Leninism, from which he adopted the idea that the revolution would be possible through the work of a party constituted as a "war machine", made up of a vanguard of "cadres" that would in turn be the most advanced expression of the world proletariat, destined to establish the dictatorship of the proletariat. In addition, imperialism is described as a new stage of capitalism.
- Maoism, which mainly included the experience of the Chinese Communist Revolution and the concept of people's war, to which Guzmán granted the category of principle of universal validity, along with Mao's theory of contradictions, according to which the struggle of opposites would be generalized at all levels of matter, society and thought.

Finally, Gonzalo Thought unites all of the above and applies it to the Peruvian reality as a development elaborated by Guzmán from the thought of Mariátegui (Mariátegui's thought being considered a "political expression of the Peruvian working class"). Gonzalo Thought was accepted by Guzmán's followers as an official ideology, as it would be "the only scientific one", a superior way of appreciating reality.

The term "Gonzalo Thought" includes not only the writings of Guzmán, but also the entire ideological, political, and military line approved by the leadership of PCP-SL. The journalist Gustavo Gorriti describes the way in which, after the first armed actions of PCP-SL, each committee produced a written assessment of what had been learned and sent it to the Central Committee to be synthesized and disseminated throughout the party apparatus for future actions.

== Components ==
=== Anti-revisionism ===
Gonzalo Thought adheres to the anti-revisionist line of Marxism, considering revisionists as:

A cancer, a cancer that has to be ruthlessly swept away, otherwise we will not be able to advance in the revolution; and remember what Lenin said, synthetically, we must forge in two issues, forge in revolutionary violence and forge in the implacable struggle against opportunism, against revisionism.

In this way, ideological purity and complete adherence to what was considered the correct line within Marxism was encouraged.

=== Use of violence ===
Gonzalo Thought calls for the use of violence through the "people's war" and the "blood quota." For Guzmán:

Regarding violence, we start from a principle established by Chairman Mao Tse Tung: violence is a universal law without any exception, I mean revolutionary violence; This violence is what allows us to resolve the fundamental contradictions with an army and through the people's war. It is a substantive question of Marxism because without revolutionary violence one class cannot be replaced by another, an old order cannot be overthrown to create a new one, a new order led by the proletariat through communist parties.

Violence, as a manifestation of class struggle, was seen as a fundamental step to overthrow the old, enabling the emergence of an overcoming stage of capitalism: communism.

=== The Four Forms of Struggle and the Eleven Procedures ===
"The Four Forms of Struggle and the Eleven Procedures" (Spanish: Las 4 formas de lucha y los 11 procedimientos) was a concept developed as part of the strategy for the seizure of power and the implementation of a "People's Republic". It was formulated in March 1983 during an expanded Central Committee meeting of Shining Path (Spanish: Sendero Luminoso), where the following eleven procedures were established: "guerrilla action (see guerrilla warfare), counter-reestablishments, harvest seizures, scorched-earth operations, ambushes, sabotage of the road system, disabling trunk routes, airports, psychological warfare, harassment to break movements, and selective terrorism".

The four forms of struggle were defined as "armed propaganda, guerrilla combat, collective killing, and sabotage". The armed strike (Spanish: paro armado) was later considered a fifth form of struggle, understood as the combination of the previous four.

=== Instrumentalization of education ===
Within Gonzalo Thought, education has the role of recruitment, propaganda and indoctrination of the masses. In this way, the control of university spaces is considered important to train university students in Gonzalo Thought so that they can transmit Guzmán's postulates to the masses.

=== Cult of personality ===
The cult of personality around Abimael Guzmán was promoted by the Shining Path, reaching the level of fanaticism. Described as a "messianic leader", the capture of Guzman directly led to the Shining Path's collapse. Upon his death a national debate ensued that led to the cremation of his remains.

=== Radical anti-capitalism ===
Gonzalo Thought categorized all types of private property or commerce as capitalist, going so far as murdering cattle and destroying hydroelectric plants; the justification was that all of these were capitalist instruments. This action was compared to British Luddism of the 19th century. Furthermore, highland peasants were prohibited from buying or selling, for the very fact that it was considered capitalist.

=== Class executions ===
Anyone who was related to or was identified as part of the "bourgeois state", or a collaborator with it, deserved execution, which is why cruelty in murders was encouraged to achieve the obedience of the masses.

=== Permanent cultural revolution ===
Inspired by Mao's Cultural Revolution (which sought to eliminate the remains of what were considered capitalist and traditional elements of Chinese society), Gonzalo Thought promoted a permanent cultural revolution that would eliminate representatives of the previous society, "changing souls" and preventing the return of capitalism.

== Reactions inside Shining Path ==
Despite the cult of personality around Guzmán, the introduction of Gonzalo Thought encountered some opposition at the party's first National Congress in 1988.

== See also ==
- Communism in Peru
- Revolutionary Internationalist Movement
- Territory of the Shining Path
