= Comrade José =

Peruvian communist militant

Víctor Quispe Palomino
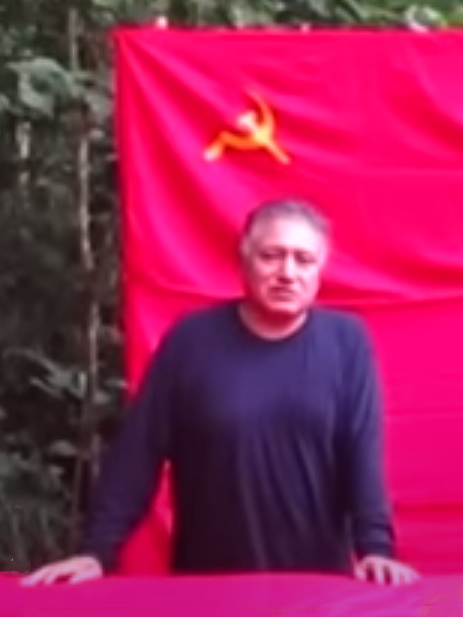

Leader of the Militarized Communist Party of Peru
- Incumbent
- Assumed office 1999
- Preceded by: Comrade Feliciano

Personal details
- Born: Victor Quispe Palomino; 1 August 1960 (age 66) Ayacucho, Peru
- Party: Militarized Communist Party of Peru
- Occupation: Terrorist leader, guerilla
- Known for: Protracted guerilla insurgency tactics

Víctor Quispe Palomino (born 1 August 1960), also known as Comrade José (Camarada José), is a Peruvian communist militant, and leader of the Militarized Communist Party of Peru, an offshoot of the Marxist–Leninist–Maoist guerrilla Shining Path. The group is present in the VRAEM region.

By late November 2007, DIRCOTE had identified Quispe Palomino as one of the ten most wanted terrorists in the Apurimac and Ene River Valley (VRAE). In 2008, it was reported that captured Shining Path documents showed that Comrade Jose was claiming to be the successor of Shining Path founder Abimael Guzmán. On 31 May 2009, Comrade José gave an interview to a reporter from Punto Final, a Peruvian news show. During the interview Comrade José took responsibility for Shining Path actions, admitted that he personally participated in the Lucanamarca massacre, and demonstrated a group of child soldiers under his command. Peruvian President Alan García responded by announcing that the Peruvian government would denounce the Shining Path before the United Nations and the Organization of American States for their use of child combatants.

In his Punto Final interview, Comrade José also claimed that both of his parents had been members of the Shining Path, and that his father died in combat with the Rondas Campesinas while his mother was arrested. He also spoke of his youth at San Cristóbal of Huamanga University and said that he had three major combat wounds, including a bullet in his chest. He also said that he had close to 300 men under his command and they collected "war taxes" from narcotics traffickers. Comrade José also called his siblings "political embarrassments." This was a reference to the fact that they collaborated with military intelligence during the capture of Comrade Feliciano.

The U.S. Department of State is currently offering a reward of $5 million USD for information leading to the arrest of Victor Quispe Palomino.
