= Comrade Artemio =

Peruvian guerrilla leader

Florindo Flores
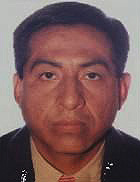

Leader of the Shining Path (Huallaga faction)
- In office 14 July 1999 – 12 February 2012
- Preceded by: Comrade Feliciano
- Succeeded by: Faction dissolved

Personal details
- Born: 8 September 1961 (age 65) Santa Isabel de Siguas District, Peru
- Known for: Protracted guerilla insurgency tactics
- Nickname: Comrade Artemio

Military service
- Branch/service: People's Guerrilla Army
- Rank: Commander
- Battles/wars: Internal conflict in Peru
- Criminal information
- Convictions: Terrorism; Drug trafficking Money laundering
- Penalty: Life in prison

Florindo Eleuterio Flores Hala (better known as Comrade Artemio; born 8 September 1961) is a Peruvian former militant who was a leader of the Maoist terrorist group Shining Path until he was captured by the Peruvian Army.

== Early life ==
Flores was born on 8 September 1961, in Peru's southern Arequipa province. His family were landless and impoverished and Flores sang on the street in order to help support his family. He attended school in Camana, but dropped out when he was seventeen, later joining the Peruvian Army. He served in the 221 Tank Battalion in Locumba, Tacna from 1979 until December 1980. After his time in the army, he began reading books on Mao Zedong and joined Shining Path sometime in the early 1980's. Reportedly he was 18 years old when he joined the guerrilla.

== Shining Path ==
Very little was known about Comrade Artemio. He has appeared on video tapes, but always wearing a ski mask, often with an extra piece of cloth sewed on to hide his eyes. Messages supposed to have been written by him make the claim that he is only the regional commander of the Shining Path for the Huallaga Valley, implying that he is not the leader of the entire movement.

On 26 September 2006, a news crew from the television show Panorama interviewed Artemio in a jungle base established by Shining Path. They also filmed about 50 Shining Path militants, all of whom were masked. Artemio demanded that the Peruvian government grant amnesty to imprisoned Shining Path members and open a peace dialogue with the remaining Shining Path members. Days after the report, the National Police raided the site where Artemio gave the interview. Some Shining Path members were arrested, but Artemio was not. In November 2007, police claimed to have killed Artemio's second-in-command, a guerrilla known as JL.

In September 2008, he gave his first recorded interview since 2006. In it he stated that the Shining Path would continue to fight despite escalating military pressure.

On 7 December 2011, it was reported that Flores had admitted that the Shining Path were defeated. He is said to have offered 'dialogue' with the government regarding disarmament.

The next day, The Guardian released an interview with "Comrade Artemio," identified as Florindo Eleuterio Flores-Hala. Flores admitted "mistakes" in continuing the Shining Path's war effort, and said he was ready to negotiate terms with the Peruvian government.

== Capture in the Operation Crepúsculo, arrest and trial ==
On 12 February 2012, Flores was captured by a combined force of the Peruvian Army and the Police. Doctors removed two bullets from his stomach. The case garnered some attention in Chile as Flores–still-injured–expressed anti-Chilean sentiment during what is thought to have been a panic attack in the military flight that took him to Lima.

On 7 June 2013, Flores was sentenced to life imprisonment and ordered to pay 500 million soles in civil reparations. He was found guilty of terrorism, drug trafficking, and money laundering. After being convicted, Judge Clotilde Cavero said that it had been proven that he was a member of the central committee of Shining Path and that Flores had "ordered the execution of a number of civilians, police and soldiers."
