= Llochegua District =

Coordinates: 12.4°S 73.9°W

Llochegua Lluchiwa
- District
- Interactive map of Llochegua
- Country: Peru
- Region: Ayacucho
- Province: Huanta
- Founded: September 14, 2000
- Capital: Llochegua

Government
  - Mayor: Pedro Maximo Lopez Carbajal

Area
  - Total: 713.71 km^{2} (275.56 sq mi)
- Elevation: 530 m (1,740 ft)

Population (2005 census)
  - Total: 11,897
  - Density: 16.669/km^{2} (43.173/sq mi)
- Time zone: UTC-5 (PET)
- UBIGEO: 050408

Llochegua District is one of eight districts of the province Huanta in Peru.

== Ethnic groups ==
The people in the district are mainly indigenous citizens of Quechua descent. Quechua is the language which the majority of the population (66.25%) learnt to speak in childhood, 32.81% of the residents started speaking using the Spanish language (2007 Peru Census).
