= Shining Path =

Maoist communist party in Peru

Communist Party of Peru Partido Comunista del Perú
- Abbreviation: PCP (official); PCP-SL (unofficial)
- Leaders: Abimael Guzmán (1969–1993); Óscar Ramírez Durand (1993–1999)
- Founder: Abimael Guzmán
- Founded: 1969 (de facto)
- Split from: Peruvian Communist Party – Red Flag
- Succeeded by: Negotiating faction (Note: Known locally as "accord-seekers" (Spanish: acuerdistas), this faction seeks the "political solution to the problems derived from the people's war", a political strategy by Guzmán that was updated in 2006 to include a "general amnesty and national reconciliation". Its organisations are: MOVADEF: active from 2009 to 2024.; FUDEPP: active since 2014.); Combatant faction (Note: Known by the Peruvian government as Shining Path Remnants (Spanish: remanentes de Sendero Luminoso), this faction's groups rejected the peace talks of 1993 to continue the conflict: PCP – Pro-Seguir (Sendero Rojo): active from 1992 to 1999 in the VRAEM area.; PCP – Red Mantaro Base Committee: active since 2001 in the Mantaro area.; PCP – Huallaga Regional Committee: active from 2004 to 2012 in the Huallaga area.; Militarized Communist Party of Peru: successor of PCP Pro-Seguir. Separate from the SL since 2018.)
- Armed wing: People's Liberation Army
- Membership: 3,000 combatants (1990); 50,000 supporters (1990)
- Ideology: Communism; Marxism–Leninism–Maoism; Gonzalo Thought; Anti-revisionism; Revolutionary socialism
- Political position: Far-left
- International affiliation: International Communist League; Revolutionary Internationalist Movement (defunct)
- Colors: Red
- Slogan: ¡Viva la Guerra Popular! ¡Guerra Popular hasta el comunismo! ("Long live the People's War! People's War until communism!")

Party flag

The Shining Path (Spanish: Sendero Luminoso, SL), officially the Communist Party of Peru (Partido Comunista del Perú, abbr. PCP), is a far-left political party and guerrilla group in Peru, following Marxism–Leninism–Maoism and Gonzalo Thought. The group is designated as a terrorist organization by the government of Peru, the United States, the European Union, Japan, and Canada. Academics often refer to the group as the Communist Party of Peru – Shining Path (Partido Comunista del Perú – Sendero Luminoso, abbr. PCP-SL) to distinguish it from other communist parties in Peru.

When it first launched its "people's war" in 1980, the Shining Path's goal was to overthrow the government through guerrilla warfare and replace it with a New Democracy. The Shining Path believed that by establishing a dictatorship of the proletariat, inducing a cultural revolution, and eventually sparking a world revolution, they could arrive at a Communist society. Their representatives stated that the then-existing socialist countries were revisionist, and the Shining Path was the vanguard of the world communist movement. The Shining Path's ideology and tactics have influenced other Maoist insurgent groups, such as the Communist Party of Nepal (Maoist) and other Revolutionary Internationalist Movement-affiliated organizations.

The Shining Path has been widely condemned for its excessive brutality, including violence deployed against peasants, such as the Lucanamarca massacre, as well as for its violence towards trade union organizers, competing Marxist groups, elected officials, and the general public. The Shining Path is regarded as a terrorist organization by the government of Peru, along with Japan, the United States, the European Union, and Canada, all of whom consequently prohibit funding and other financial support to the group.

Since the capture of Shining Path founder Abimael Guzmán in 1992 and of his successors Óscar Ramírez ("Comrade Feliciano") in 1999 and Eleuterio Flores ("Comrade Artemio") in 2012, the Shining Path has declined in activity. The main remaining faction of the Shining Path, the Militarized Communist Party of Peru (MPCP), (Note: Following Guzmán's talks with the Peruvian government in 1992, his "pro-agreement" faction was opposed by Óscar Ramírez's Communist Party of Peru – Marxist-Leninist-Maoist (Partido Comunista del Perú – Marxista-Leninista-Maoísta, abbr. PCP-MLM), better known as Sendero Rojo, or as the Pro-Seguir faction (SL-Proseguir). This group operated until Ramírez's capture in 1999, after which the group was reorganised under the Quispe Palomino brothers. It formally renounced its links to the Shining Path and declared itself a separate entity in 2018.) is active in the VRAEM region of Peru, and it has since distanced itself from the Shining Path's legacy in 2018 in order to maintain the support of peasants previously persecuted by the Shining Path. In addition to the MPCP, the Communist Party of Peru – Red Mantaro Base Committee (PCP-CBMR) has been operating in the Mantaro Valley since 2001, while the Communist Party of Peru – Huallaga Regional Committee (PCP-CRH) (Note: Also known simply as the "Huallaga Faction".) was active at the Huallaga region from 2004 until Comrade Artemio's capture in 2012.

== Name ==
The group's official name is the Communist Party of Peru (PCP), a name seen in all of its self-produced documents, periodicals, and other materials. The acronym PCP-SL is unofficially used by organizations, such as the Truth and Reconciliation Commission, to distinguish the group from other groups who claim the original name and acronym.

The group's common name, Shining Path, distinguishes it from several other Peruvian communist parties with similar names. The name is derived from a maxim of José Carlos Mariátegui, the founder of the original Peruvian Communist Party (from which the rest of communist parties split; now commonly known as the "PCP-Unidad") in the 1920s: "El Marxismo-Leninismo abrirá el sendero luminoso hacia la revolución" ("Marxism–Leninism will open the shining path to revolution"). This maxim was featured on the masthead of the newspaper of a Shining Path front group. The followers of this group are generally called senderistas.

== Structure ==
=== Organization ===
The Shining Path's remnants currently operate in the VRAEM region and primarily comprises two groups and their sub-branches; a paramilitary wing and a political wing. It was originally organised using a "concentric construction" model of structure with Communist Party organs as the complete center, followed by the paramilitary wing surrounding it, and lastly the political wing in the outermost circle. This ensured the political party retained control of both its armed and social branches, contrasting itself with the more frequent foquismo model that swept through Latin American insurgencies after the Cuban Revolution.

The capture of Shining Path leader Abimael Guzmán in 1992 led to the eventual splintering of the group into several factions, referred to by the Peruvian government as Shining Path remnants (Spanish: remanentes de Sendero Luminoso). Of these, the Militarized Communist Party of Peru (MPCP) is considered the group's main successor, founded in 1999 by brothers Víctor and Jorge Quispe Palomino after the collapse of Sendero Rojo, the faction that had rejected Guzmán's peace treaty. Also active is a faction in the Mantaro Valley since 2001. The group's remnants reportedly obtain their revenue from cocaine trafficking, and of these, the MPCP has attempted to recharacterise and distance itself from the original group that had attacked rural communities in the area, describing Guzmán as a "traitor".

==== Paramilitary wing ====
People's Guerilla Army
- Ejército Guerrillero Popular
- Dates active: 3 December 1982 – 9 June 2018
- Active regions: Peru
- Size: 350 (2015)

The People's Guerrilla Army (Ejército Guerrillero Popular, EGP) was officially created on 3 December 1982 for the purposes of combat, mobilisation and producing an income for the group. After 1992, it continued to operate under Sendero Rojo, the group's armed successor until 1999, and later under the Huallaga faction that existed from 2004 to 2012. Since 2001, it has been operated by the Mantaro faction under the name of People's Liberation Army (Ejército Popular de Liberación, EPL).

The EGP's structure is as follows:

- Main Force (Fuerza Principal; FP): Mainly armed with larger weapons, such as the AKM and FN FAL rifles as well as the Heckler & Koch HK21 machine gun. Due to proficiency in armaments, this group is tasked with ambushing police and soldiers. They do not remain in locations, usually traveling across regions.
- Local Force (Fuerza Local; FL): These members are local agricultural workers who are provided minor weapons and periodically assist FP members, then later return to their work. Skilled FL members are moved into the FP's ranks.
- Base Force (Fuerza de Base; FB): Some of the peasants of territories captured by the Shining Path are grouped into the FB, typically serving as reservists armed with handheld weapons such as knives, spears and machetes. FB members occasionally serve in surveillance tasks.

In 2009, then president Alan García accused the group of using child soldiers to execute wounded army personnel. The following year, the Coordinadora Nacional de Derechos Humanos presented a report to the Inter-American Commission on Human Rights (CIDH) detailing this practice by both the group and the Peruvian Armed Forces.

Under the leadership of Víctor Quispe Palomino, it was reorganised as the Popular Revolutionary Army (Spanish: Ejército Popular Revolucionario; ERP) until the MPCP's formal establishment and distancing from Guzmán's original Shining Path in June 2018, after which it has claimed the name of Revolutionary Armed Forces of Peru (Spanish: Fuerzas armadas revolucionarias del Perú). In 2020, it was reported to have made money from selling cigarettes, clothes, candy, raffles and other methods.

==== Political wing ====
The United Front (Frente Unido) serves as the political and bureaucratic arm of the Shining Path that uses generated organisms (Spanish: organismo generado), or civil organisations that support the group. It has two main branches, MOVADEF (2009–2024) and FUDEPP, as well as a number of multiple smaller organisations, usually specified to a particular purpose or issue. Examples of these include:

Group	Description
Frente para la Unidad y Defensa del Pueblo Peruano	The Front for Unity and Defense of the Peruvian People (FUDEPP) was created in 2015. In association with MOVADEF, the group announced that it had 73 provincial committees and allegedly received 400,000 to 500,000 signatures for the JNE to participate in the 2016 Peruvian general election. They were ultimately prevented from participating in the elections.
Movimiento Popular Perú	The Peru People's Movement (MPP) serves as the group's international relations front.
Defunct organisations
Asociación de Abogados Democráticos	The Democratic Lawyer's Association (AAD) was in charge of the legal defence of captured militants.
Comités de Apoyo a la Revolución Peruana	The Support Committees for the Peruvian Revolution (CARP) were a series of overseas associations that formed part of the group's international support branch.
Coordinadora Clasista Magisterial	The Classist Teachers Coordination (CCM) was a teacher union front whose goal was to usurp the influence of the Single Union of Education Workers of Peru (SUTEP), which held ties to one of the Shining Path's political rivals, Red Fatherland (PCP-PR). The CCM was to be purposed as a unification of Peru's teachers to serve as both dissemination and recruitment for the Shining Path's violent takeover of the country.
Luminosas Trincheras de Combate	The Shining Trenches of Combat (LTC) served as support bases for Shining Path prisoners until their dissolution in 1992.
Musical Guerrilla Army	Also known in Spanish as the Ejército Musical Guerrillero (EMG), it was a British musical group founded by Adolfo Olaechea in 1991 as part of the group's international propaganda arm. It was made up of various Latin American musicians (especially Peruvian) residing in the United Kingdom and would typically play both folk and revolutionary songs at yearly May Day events in London. Such music included Flor de Retama, El Hombre, and Jovaldo.
"Pioneritos"	Youth organisations based on the Pioneer movement.
Socorro Popular	People's Aid (SOPO) was created in 1979 under the leadership of Yovanka Pardavé Trujillo after the party's Tenth Expanded Plenary Session session established civil organizations to recruit the civilian population into a United Front for subversion. It was purposed to provide legal defence to members and associates accused by the state for crimes such as terrorism. It also provided logistical and medical support. In 1985, SOPO suffered an internal line struggle over the issue of the militarization of mass organizations. By the end of 1986, SOPO became integral to the Shining Path's armed "people's war," with militant detachments carved out of the group for conducting various terrorist attacks. Directed by the Pilot Plan of the Revolutionary Movement for the Defense of the People (MRDP), SOPO would displace the Metropolitan Committee (METRO) as an important central apparatus. Pardavé was replaced by Martha Huatay in 1991, who led the group until it was dismantled in 1992 after both Trujillo and Huatay were captured by DIRCOTE agents.
Movimiento Clasista Barrial	The Neighbourhood Class Movement (MCB) tended to invade and occupy private property until their disestablishment.
Movimiento de Artistas Populares	The Popular Artist Movement (MAP) was formed in 1988. Its purpose was to utilize artists to disseminate political propaganda to the population through the art of sloganeering, with particular attention to the universities. It regularly incorporated folklore in its work. Although the exact connection between Shining Path's central apparatus and MAP is disputed, with some considering it as an independent development from the party, the MAP was a contributing effort to the communists' protracted "people's war." MAP actions were carried out in universities, union halls, neighbourhoods, cultural institutions and young towns. Performances included theatrical performances, dance and music through sikuri groups.
Movimiento de Obreros y Trabajadores Clasistas	The Movement of Classist Workers and Laborers (MOTC) was formed in 1976, and formalised into the Shining Path's united front in 1979. It had the objective of recruiting urban union workers for the party, however it mainly had a presence with informal and itinerant workers. After the Chuschi attack, the MOTC initiated the first Shining Path attack in Lima with molotov cocktails at San Martín de Porres District.
Movimiento de Trabajadores Ambulantes	The Street Vendors' Movement (MTA) was created to target street vendors.
Movimiento Femenino Popular	The Popular Woman's Movement (MFP) was created by Augusta La Torre as the main feminist branch of the group.
Movimiento Intelectual Popular	The Popular Intellectual Movement (MIP) was an academic-based mass organization created in 1979 as part of the party's Fourth Expanded Plenary Session, which defined the structure and duties of various legal fronts to serve recruitment of the united front. It was directed by Hugo Muñoz Sánchez and targeted students, professors, writers, artists, and journalists. The organization had influence in both universities and pro-Sendero neighbourhoods, which would be used to form an ideological justification for the party's subversive actions, including its terrorist attacks. MIP was involved with the propaganda of other mass organizations, such as the Popular Women's Movement, The Front of Mariateguist Artists and Intellectuals (FAIM), The Pink School (in France), and The Ayacucho Study Circle (in Sweden). Like many public fronts associated with the Shining Path, the MIP fell in significance with the relative decline and collapse of the central party body.
Movimiento Juvenil Popular	The Popular Youth Movement (MJP) was one of the first organisms established by the group.
Movimiento por la Amnistía y Derechos Fundamentales	The Movement for Amnesty and Fundamental Rights (MOVADEF) was created on 20 November 2009 when Alfredo Crespo, the defense lawyer of Abimael Guzmán, and fifteen others gathered. MOVADEF has three sub-branches; the Central Historical Committee, the Provisional Central Committee and the National Executive Committee (CEN). The branch filed to become a political party in Peru with the National Jury of Elections (JNE) in 2011, though the application was denied. The Peruvian government had accused MOVADEF of advocating terrorism, eventually ordering the dissolution of the group in 2024.

=== Ideology ===
As its power grew, the Shining Path changed its official ideology from "Marxism–Leninism–Mao Zedong thought" to "Marxism–Leninism–Maoism–Gonzalo thought" – according to some authors, a cult of personality grew around Guzmán.

Ideologically Maoist, the Shining Path is unique because it did not completely accept orthodox Marxist doctrine, instead, it considered the teachings of Guzmán to supersede the teachings of Marx, Lenin, Stalin and Mao. Guzmán's philosophy combined Marxism–Leninism, Maoism and indigenous Indian traditionalism, championing the liberation of Peru's Quechua-speaking Incans and mestizos. The party's name was also coined by Guzmán, who infused his communist rhetoric with Inca mythology, he described his form of Marxist-Maoist thought as a "shining path" towards the liberation of Peru's natives. Because of this, the Shining Path also featured elements of Incan particularism, and it also rejected outside influences, especially non-indigenous influences.

The Shining Path declared that it was a feminist organization and in accordance with this declaration, many women acquired leadership positions. In the organisation, 40% of the fighters and 50% of the members of its Central Committee were women.

==== People's Republic ====
The Shining Path sought to replace the Republic of Peru with a "People's Republic which would adhere to the doctrine of New Democracy" (Spanish: República Popular de Nueva Democracia, RPND), also known by its proposed name of "People's Republic of Peru" (Spanish: República Popular del Perú). The RPND was first named at the third session of the first central committee, held in 1983, with its establishment meaning that the armed branch of the group would become a "People's Liberation Army," as per the group's so-called grand plan. Additionally, the term "People's Republic" was also suggested as a possible name for the upcoming state.

=== Use of violence ===
Although the reliability of reports regarding the Shining Path's actions remains a matter of controversy in Peru, the organization's use of violence is well documented. According to InSight Crime, Shining Path would kill their opponents "with assassinations, bombings, beheadings and massacres" as well as "stoning victims to death. Peru’s Asháninka minority, who fought on both sides during the civil war, suffered disproportionately. Around 6000 were killed or more than 10% of the ethnic group’s 1993 population, alongside kidnappings and sexual violence.

The Shining Path rejected the concept of human rights; a Shining Path document stated:

We start by not ascribing to either the Universal Declaration of Human Rights or the Costa Rica Convention on Human Rights, but we have used their legal devices to unmask and denounce the old Peruvian state... For us, human rights are contradictory to the rights of the people, because we base rights in man as a social product, not man as an abstract with innate rights. "Human rights" do not exist except for the bourgeois man, a position that was at the forefront of feudalism, like liberty, equality, and fraternity were advanced for the bourgeoisie of the past. But today, since the appearance of the proletariat as an organized class in the Communist Party, with the experience of triumphant revolutions, with the construction of socialism, new democracy and the dictatorship of the proletariat, it has been proven that human rights serve the oppressor class and the exploiters who run the imperialist and landowner-bureaucratic states. Bourgeois states in general... Our position is very clear. We reject and condemn human rights because they are bourgeois, reactionary, counterrevolutionary rights, and are today a weapon of revisionists and imperialists, principally Yankee imperialists.

— Communist Party of Peru – Shining Path, Sobre las Dos Colinas

After the collapse of the Fujimori government, interim President Valentín Paniagua established a Truth and Reconciliation Commission to investigate the conflict. The Commission found in its 2003 Final Report that 69,280 people died or disappeared between 1980 and 2000 as a result of the armed conflict. The Shining Path was found to be responsible for about 54% of the deaths and disappearances reported to the commission. A statistical analysis of the available data led the Truth and Reconciliation Commission to estimate that the Shining Path was responsible for the death or disappearance of 31,331 people, 46% of the total deaths and disappearances. According to a summary of the report by Human Rights Watch, "Shining Path ... killed about half the victims, and roughly one-third died at the hands of government security forces ... The commission attributed some of the other slayings to a smaller guerrilla group and local militias. The rest remain unattributed." The MRTA was held responsible for 1.5% of the deaths.

A 2019 study disputed the casualty figures from the Truth and Reconciliation Commission, estimating instead "a total of 48,000 killings, substantially lower than the TRC estimate", and concluding that "the Peruvian State accounts for a significantly larger share than the Shining Path." The TRC later came out to respond to these statements.

==== Violence against LGBT people ====
The Shining Path has been accused of violence against LGBT people. According to one woman who was kidnapped by the Shining Path in 1981, a homosexual man's penis was cut into pieces before he was murdered. The Peruvian government did not reveal the name of the victim. The Shining Path defended its actions by saying that LGBT individuals were not killed because of their sexual identity, instead, they were killed because of their "collaboration with the police." On August 6, 1986, Shining Path executed multiple gay men and sex workers at the Aucayacu massacre. On September 12, 1988, Shining Path executed several homosexual sex workers at Pucallpa.

The Shining Path has denied such allegations, stating, "It is probable that the PCP has executed a homosexual, but rest assured that it was not done because of their sexual orientation but because of their position against the revolution... Our view is that homosexual orientation is not an ideological matter but one of individual preference... Party membership is open to all those who support the cause of communist revolution and the principles of Marxism-Leninism-Maoism, Gonzalo Thought, regardless of what their sexual preferences may be."

==== Women in the Shining Path ====
The number of women involved in the armed struggle remained high throughout the war, participating at almost all logistical, military and strategic levels as militants, guerrilla commanders and top party leaders of the organisation. The high proportion of women was a given and desired from the outset; the success of the internal Peruvian revolution was explicitly made dependent on the participation of women. Up to forty per cent of the guerrillas were women, and there were countless "ladies of death" who led military commandos. In 1992, at least eight of the nineteen members of the Central Committee were women, including three of the five members of the Politburo, and in 1980 more than a third of the women arrested had a degree. In criminal proceedings against senderistas in 1987, the majority were women. The Shining Path was the first guerrilla organisation to incorporate women on a completely equal military footing with its male members, actively recruiting women on a large scale and appointing them to leading positions.

The Movimiento Femenino Popular (MFP) group was officially formed in 1974 from the merger of two groups, the Centro Femenino Popular and the Frente Femenino Universitario. The "MFP Manifiesto" traces the origins of the group back to the mid-1960s, when female students and academics began to organise their own groups and factions in other student organisations and to reflect on revolution and "the thesis of the great Lenin on the participation of women and the success of a revolution" from 1968 onwards. During these years, more and more women were studying and trying to enter the labour market. The percentage of women at university in Ayacucho was particularly high: in 1968, 30% of students were women, mainly in the departments of obstetrics and social and educational services. The unequal access to work and education exacerbated the differences between classes and between rural and urban populations, especially within the female population. Women became increasingly involved and organised in various movements as an expression of their protest and frustration. So much so, that by the year 1990, women held eight of the nineteen Central Committee positions. This was more involvement from women than any of the other leftist movements in Peru. Women in Peru even acknowledge the Shining Path movement as a step-away from the male-dominated societies that are renowned in many parts of Latin America. This was far different than what has been seen before the Peruvian Truth was revealed. Many women were joining the armed forces to obtain basic rights and securities. Despite many arrests and incarcerations of women, this time period revolutionized women's rights in Peru. The legacy of the shining path with regard to feminism is polarizing. The Shining Path could potentially be considered one of it not the most feminist in terms of leadership percentage Communist movements in history. Despite this Gonzalo's movement would see significant human rights violations being inflicted upon Peruvian girls some at the age of thirteen being forced into the role of sex slaves.

== History ==
=== Establishment ===
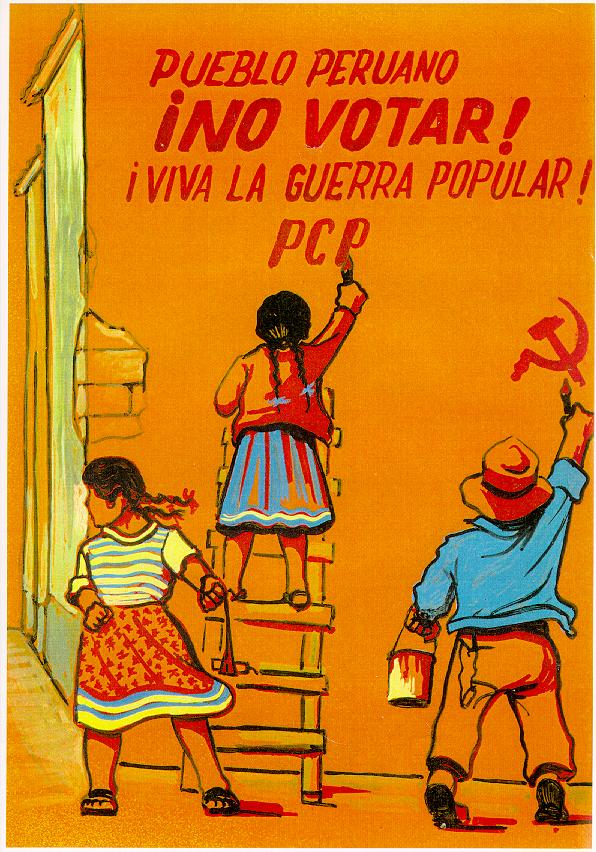
Shining Path poster supporting an electoral boycott

The Shining Path was founded in 1969 by Abimael Guzmán, a former university philosophy professor (his followers referred to him by his nom de guerre Presidente Gonzalo), and a group of 11 others. Guzmán was heavily influenced by a trip to China and admired the teachings of Mao Zedong. His teachings created the foundation of its militant Maoist doctrine. It was an offshoot of the Peruvian Communist Party – Red Flag, which itself split from the original Peruvian Communist Party founded by José Carlos Mariátegui in 1928.

Antonio Díaz Martínez, an agronomist who became a leader of the Shining Path, made several important contributions to the group's ideology. In his books Ayacucho, Hambre y Esperanza (1969) and China, La Revolución Agraria (1978), he expressed his own conviction of the necessity that revolutionary activity in Peru follow strictly the teachings of Mao Zedong.

From 1970 to 1977, Shining Path built a student organization and regional-committee based party in Lima and the central sierra. The Shining Path first established a foothold at San Cristóbal of Huamanga University, in Ayacucho, where Guzmán taught philosophy. The university had recently reopened after being closed for about half a century. Between 1973 and 1975, the Shining Path members gained control of the student councils at the Universities of Huancayo and La Cantuta, and they also developed a significant presence at the National University of Engineering in Lima and the National University of San Marcos. Sometime later, it lost many student elections in the universities, including Guzmán's San Cristóbal of Huamanga.

Guzmán believed that communism required a "popular war" and distanced himself from organizing workers. The Shining Path opposed large national strikes in 1977 and 1978 because it viewed some of the participants as revisionists or tools of "socio-imperialism".

From 1977 to 1980, the Shining Path focused on preparing for revolution, including building training camps in Ayacucho, developing a political and military organization, and recruiting more radical members of other Marxist groups. Beginning on 17 March 1980, the Shining Path held a series of clandestine meetings in Ayacucho, known as the Central Committee's second plenary. It formed a "Revolutionary Directorate" that was political and military in nature and ordered its militias to transfer to strategic areas in the provinces to start the "armed struggle". The group also held its "First Military School", where members were instructed in military tactics and the use of weapons. They also engaged in criticism and self-criticism, a Maoist practice intended to purge bad habits and avoid the repetition of mistakes. During the existence of the First Military School, members of the Central Committee came under heavy criticism. Guzmán did not, and he emerged from the First Military School as the clear leader of the Shining Path. By May 1980, the central committee concluded the party and its military structure had been sufficiently developed to begin revolution.

A timeline of the Peruvian Communist Party (PCP)'s splinter groups is as follows:

=== Armed conflict (1980–1993) ===
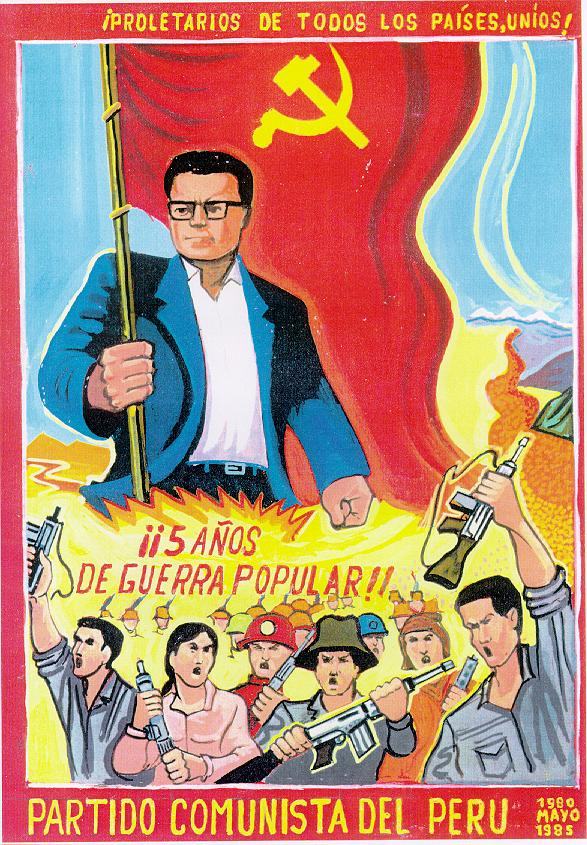
Poster of Abimael Guzmán celebrating five years of people's war

By 1980, Shining Path had about 500 members. When Peru's military government allowed elections for the first time in twelve years in 1980, the Shining Path was one of the few leftist political groups that declined to take part. It chose instead to begin a guerrilla war in the highlands of the Ayacucho Region. On 17 May 1980, on the eve of the presidential elections, it burned ballot boxes in the town of Chuschi. It was the first "act of war" by the Shining Path. The perpetrators were quickly caught, and additional ballots were shipped to Chuschi. The elections proceeded without further problems, and the incident received little attention in the Peruvian press.

Throughout the 1980s, the Shining Path grew both in terms of the territory it controlled and in the number of militants in its organization, particularly in the Andean highlands. It gained support from local peasants by filling the political void left by the central government and providing what they called "popular justice", public trials that disregard any legal and human rights that deliver swift and brutal sentences including public executions. This caused the peasantry of some Peruvian villages to express some sympathy for the Shining Path, especially in the impoverished and neglected regions of Ayacucho, Apurímac, and Huancavelica. At times, the civilian population of small, neglected towns participated in popular trials, especially when the victims of the trials were widely disliked.

The Shining Path's credibility benefited from the government's initially tepid response to the insurgency. For over a year, the government refused to declare a state of emergency in the region where the Shining Path was operating. The Interior Minister, José María de la Jara, believed the group could be easily defeated through police actions. Additionally, the president, Fernando Belaúnde Terry, who returned to power in 1980, was reluctant to cede authority to the armed forces since his first government had ended in a military coup.

On 29 December 1981, the government declared an "emergency zone" in the three Andean regions of Ayacucho, Huancavelica, and Apurímac and granted the military the power to arbitrarily detain any suspicious person. The military abused this power, arresting scores of innocent people, at times subjecting them to torture during interrogation as well as rape. Members of the Peruvian Armed Forces began to wear black ski-masks to hide their identities, in order to protect themselves and their families.

In some areas, the military trained peasants and organized them into anti-rebel militias, called "rondas". They were generally poorly equipped, despite being provided arms by the state. The rondas would attack the Shining Path guerrillas, with the first such reported attack occurring in January 1983, near Huata. Ronderos would later kill 13 guerrilla fighters in February 1983, in Sacsamarca. In March 1983, ronderos brutally killed Olegario Curitomay, one of the commanders of the town of Lucanamarca. They took him to the town square, stoned him, stabbed him, set him on fire, and finally shot him. The Shining Path's retaliation to this was one of the worst attacks in the entire conflict, with a group of guerrilla members entering the town and going house by house, killing dozens of villagers, including babies, with guns, hatchets, and axes. This action has come to be known as the Lucanamarca massacre. Additional massacres of civilians by the Shining Path would occur throughout the conflict.

The Shining Path's attacks were not limited to the countryside. It executed several attacks against the infrastructure in Lima, killing civilians in the process. In 1983, it sabotaged several electrical transmission towers, causing a citywide blackout, set fire and destroyed the Bayer industrial plant. That same year, it set off a powerful bomb in the offices of the governing party, Popular Action. Escalating its activities in Lima, in June 1985, it blew up electricity transmission towers in Lima, producing a blackout, and detonated car bombs near the government palace and the justice palace. It was believed to be responsible for bombing a shopping mall. At the time, President Fernando Belaúnde Terry was receiving the Argentine president Raúl Alfonsín.

During this period, the Shining Path assassinated specific individuals, notably leaders of other leftist groups, local political parties, labor unions, and peasant organizations, some of whom were anti-Shining Path Marxists. On 24 April 1985, in the midst of presidential elections, it tried to assassinate Domingo García Rada, the president of the Peruvian National Electoral Council, severely injuring him and mortally wounding his driver. In 1988, Constantin (Gus) Gregory, an American citizen working for the United States Agency for International Development, was assassinated. Two French aid workers were killed on 4 December that same year.

==== Level of support ====
Areas where the Shining Path was active in Peru

By 1990, the Shining Path had about 3,000 armed members at its greatest extent. The group had gained control of much of the countryside of the center and south of Peru and had a large presence in the outskirts of Lima. The Shining Path began to fight against Peru's other major guerrilla group, the Túpac Amaru Revolutionary Movement (MRTA), as well as campesino self-defense groups organized by the Peruvian armed forces.

The Shining Path quickly seized control of large areas of Peru. The group had significant support among peasant communities, and it had the support of some slum dwellers in the capital and elsewhere. The Shining Path's interpretation of Maoism did not have the support of many city dwellers. According to opinion polls, only 15 percent of the population considered subversion to be justifiable in June 1988, while only 17 percent considered it justifiable in 1991. In June 1991, "the total sample disapproved of the Shining Path by an 83 to 7 percent margin, with 10 percent not answering the question. Among the poorest, however, only 58 percent stated disapproval of the Shining Path; 11 percent said they had a favorable opinion of the Shining Path, and some 31 percent would not answer the question." A September 1991 poll found that 21 percent of those polled in Lima believed that the Shining Path did not torture and kill innocent people. The same poll found that 13 percent believed that society would be more just if the Shining Path won the war and 22 percent believed society would be equally just under the Shining Path as it was under the government. Polls have never been completely accurate since Peru has several anti-terrorism laws, including "apologia for terrorism", that makes it a punishable offense for anyone who does not condemn the Shining Path. In effect, the laws make it illegal to support the group in any way.

Many peasants were unhappy with the Shining Path's rule for a variety of reasons, such as its disrespect for indigenous culture and institutions. However, they had also made agreements and alliances with some indigenous tribes. Some did not like the brutality of its "popular trials" that sometimes included "slitting throats, strangulation, stoning, and burning." Peasants were offended by the rebels' injunction against burying the bodies of Shining Path victims.

The Shining Path followed Mao Zedong's dictum that guerrilla warfare should start in the countryside and gradually choke off the cities.

According to multiple sources, the Shining Path received support from Gaddafi's Libya.

==== Fujimori government ====
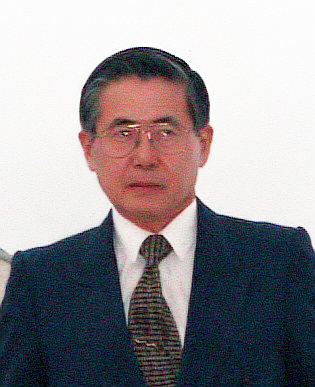
President Alberto Fujimori, who led the violent government response towards guerrilla groups during his tenure

When President Alberto Fujimori took office in 1990, he responded to Shining Path with repressive force. His government issued a law in 1991 that gave the rondas a legal status, and from that time, they were officially called Comités de auto defensa ("Committees of Self-Defense"). They were officially armed, usually with 12-gauge shotguns, and trained by the Peruvian Army. According to the government, there were approximately 7,226 comités de auto defensa as of 2005; almost 4,000 are located in the central region of Peru, the stronghold of the Shining Path.

The Peruvian government also cracked down on the Shining Path in other ways. Military personnel were dispatched to areas dominated by the Shining Path, especially Ayacucho, to fight the rebels. Ayacucho, Huancavelica, Apurímac and Huánuco were declared emergency zones, allowing for some constitutional rights to be suspended in those areas.

Initial government efforts to fight the Shining Path were not very effective or promising. Military units engaged in many human rights violations, which caused the Shining Path to appear in the eyes of many as the lesser of two evils. They used excessive force, tortured individuals accused of being sympathizers and killed many innocent civilians. Government forces destroyed villages and killed campesinos suspected of supporting the Shining Path. They eventually lessened the pace at which the armed forces committed atrocities such as massacres. Additionally, the state began the widespread use of intelligence agencies in its fight against the Shining Path. However, atrocities were committed by the National Intelligence Service and the Army Intelligence Service, notably the La Cantuta massacre, the Santa massacre and the Barrios Altos massacre, which were committed by Grupo Colina.

The Shining Path murdered three Catholic priests, the Three Martyrs of Chimbote, in August 1991.

In one of its last attacks in Lima, on 16 July 1992, the Shining Path detonated a powerful bomb on Tarata Street in the Miraflores District, full of civilian adults and children, killing 25 people and injuring an additional 155.

=== Capture of Guzmán and collapse (1992–1993) ===
On 12 September 1992, the Special Intelligence Group (GEIN) captured Guzmán and several Shining Path leaders in an apartment above a dance studio in the Surquillo district of Lima. GEIN had been monitoring the apartment since a number of suspected Shining Path militants had visited it. An inspection of the garbage of the apartment produced empty tubes of a skin cream used to treat psoriasis, a condition that Guzmán was known to have. Shortly after the raid that captured Guzmán, most of the remaining Shining Path leadership fell as well.

The capture of Guzmán left a huge leadership vacuum for the Shining Path. "There is no No. 2. There is only Presidente Gonzalo and then the party," a Shining Path political officer said at a birthday celebration for Guzmán in Lurigancho Prison in December 1990. "Without President Gonzalo, we would have nothing."

At the same time, the Shining Path suffered embarrassing military defeats to self-defense organizations of rural campesinos – supposedly its social base. When Guzmán called for peace talks with the Peruvian government, the organization fractured into splinter groups, with some Shining Path members in favor of such talks and others opposed.

=== Remnants (1993–present) ===
Guzmán's role as the leader of the Shining Path was taken over by Óscar Ramírez ("Comrade Feliciano"), who established Sendero Rojo (or PCP Pro-Seguir), aiming to reorganise the party and to continue the armed struggle while breaking with Guzmán, but not with his ideology. Together with Ramírez, Florindo Eleuterio Flores Hala, who controlled the Huallaga area, formed the initial leadership of the party. Sendero Rojo was disbanded after Comrade Feliciano's capture in 1999. After Ramírez's capture, the group further splintered, guerrilla activity diminished sharply, and peace returned to the areas where the Shining Path had been active.

The three remaining splinter groups based themselves in the VRAEM area:

- The "People's Guerrilla Army" (ERP) led by the Quispe Palomino brothers (Víctor and Jorge).
- The "Communist Party of Peru – Red Mantaro Base Committee" (PCP-CBMR), established in 2001 as a base committee in the Mantaro Valley led by a "Comrade Netzel López Lozano".
- The "Communist Party of Peru – Huallaga Regional Committee" (PCP-CRH), a collective established in 2004 in the Huallaga Valley led by Comrade Artemio.

==== Temporary resurgence (2001–2009) ====
Although the organization's numbers had lessened by 2003, a militant faction of the Shining Path called Proseguir ("Onward") continued to be active. The group had allegedly made an alliance with the Revolutionary Armed Forces of Colombia (FARC) in the early 2000s, learning how to use rockets against aircraft.

Flag used by the Red Mantaro Base Committee (PCP-CBMR), established in 2001.

On Tuesday, August 9, 2001, an armed shootout between Peruvian policemen and Shining Path guerrillas took place in Satipo province. Police forces had broken through a primary line of defence as part of a special operation while underestimating the group's numbers, who had coincidentally reunited and thus increased their numbers. This led to a shootout that lasted five hours and took the lives of four policemen and 12 senderistas.

On 20 March 2002, a car bomb exploded outside the US embassy in Lima just before a visit by President George W. Bush. Nine people were killed, and 30 were injured; the attack was suspected to be the work of the Shining Path.

On 9 June 2003, a Shining Path group attacked a camp in Ayacucho and took 68 employees of the Argentinian company Techint and three police guards as hostages. They had been working on the Camisea gas pipeline project that would take natural gas from Cusco to Lima. According to sources from Peru's Interior Ministry, the rebels asked for a sizable ransom to free the hostages. Two days later, after a rapid military response which involved a signals intelligence aircraft from the Brazilian Air Force, the rebels abandoned the hostages; according to government sources, no ransom was paid. However, there were rumors that US$200,000 was paid to the rebels.

Government forces have captured three leading Shining Path members. In April 2000, Commander José Arcela Chiroque, called "Ormeño", was captured, followed by another leader, Florentino Cerrón Cardozo, called "Marcelo", in July 2003. In November of the same year, Jaime Zuñiga, called "Cirilo" or "Dalton", was arrested after a clash in which four guerrillas were killed and an officer was wounded. Officials said he took part in planning the kidnapping of the Techint pipeline workers. He was also thought to have led an ambush against an army helicopter in 1999 in which five soldiers died.

In 2003, the Peruvian National Police broke up several Shining Path training camps and captured many members and leaders. By late October 2003, there were 96 attacks in Peru, projecting a 15% decrease from the 134 kidnappings and armed attacks in 2002. Also for the year, eight or nine people were killed by the Shining Path, and 6 senderistas were killed and 209 were captured.

Comrade Artemio, now captured and serving a life sentence in prison

In January 2004, a man known as Comrade Artemio and identifying himself as one of the Shining Path's leaders, said in a media interview that the group would resume violent operations unless the Peruvian government granted amnesty to other top Shining Path leaders within 60 days. Peru's Interior Minister, Fernando Rospigliosi, said that the government would respond "drastically and swiftly" to any violent action. In September that same year, a comprehensive sweep by police in five cities found 17 suspected members of a "Huallaga Regional Committee" (Comité Regional Huallaga; CRH). According to the interior minister, eight of the arrested were school teachers and high-level school administrators.

Despite these arrests, the Shining Path continued to exist in Peru. On 22 December 2005, the Shining Path ambushed a police patrol in the Huánuco region, killing eight. Later that day, they wounded an additional two police officers. In response, then President Alejandro Toledo declared a state of emergency in Huánuco and gave the police the power to search houses and arrest suspects without a warrant. On 19 February 2006, the Peruvian police killed Héctor Aponte, believed to be the commander responsible for the ambush. In December 2006, Peruvian troops were sent to counter renewed guerrilla activity, and according to high-level government officials, the Shining Path's strength has reached an estimated 300 members. In November 2007, police said they killed Artemio's second-in-command, a guerrilla known as JL.

In September 2008, government forces announced the killing of five rebels in the Vizcatan region. This claim was subsequently challenged by the APRODEH, a Peruvian human rights group, which believed that those who were killed were in fact local farmers and not rebels. That same month, Artemio gave his first recorded interview since 2006. In it, he stated that the Shining Path would continue to fight despite escalating military pressure. In October 2008, in Huancavelica Region, the guerrillas engaged a military convoy with explosives and firearms, demonstrating their continued ability to strike and inflict casualties on military targets. The conflict resulted in the death of 12 soldiers and two to seven civilians. It came one day after a clash in the Vizcatan region, which left five rebels and one soldier dead.

In November 2008, the rebels utilized hand grenades and automatic weapons in an assault that claimed the lives of 4 police officers. In April 2009, the Shining Path ambushed and killed 13 government soldiers in Ayacucho. Grenades and dynamite were used in the attack. The dead included eleven soldiers and one captain, and two soldiers were also injured, with one reported missing. Poor communications were said to have made relay of the news difficult. The country's Defense Minister, Antero Flores Aráoz, said many soldiers "plunged over a cliff". His prime minister, Yehude Simon, said these attacks were "desperate responses by the Shining Path in the face of advances by the armed forces" and expressed his belief that the area would soon be freed of "leftover terrorists". In the aftermath, a Sendero leader called this "the strongest [anti-government] blow ... in quite a while". In November 2009, Defense Minister Rafael Rey announced that Shining Path militants had attacked a military outpost in southern Ayacucho province. One soldier was killed and three others wounded in the assault.

==== Continued downfall ====
On 28 April 2010, Shining Path rebels in Peru ambushed and killed a police officer and two civilians who were destroying coca plantations of Aucayacu, in the central region of Haunuco, Peru. The victims were gunned down by sniper fire coming from the thick forest as more than 200 workers were destroying coca plants. Following the attack, the Shining Path faction, based in the Upper Huallaga Valley of Peru and headed by Comrade Artemio, was operating in survival mode and lost 9 of their top 10 leaders to Peruvian National Police-led capture operations. Two of the eight leaders were killed by PNP personnel during the attempted captures. The nine arrested or killed Shining Path (Upper Huallaga Valley faction) leaders include Mono (Aug. 2009), Rubén (May 2010), Izula (Oct. 2010), Sergio (Dec. 2010), Yoli/Miguel/Jorge (Jun. 2011), Gato Larry (Jun. 2011), Oscar Tigre (Aug. 2011), Vicente Roger (Aug. 2011), and Dante/Delta (Jan. 2012). This loss of leadership, coupled with a sweep of Shining Path (Upper Huallaga Valley) supporters executed by the PNP in November 2010, prompted Comrade Artemio to declare in December 2011 to several international journalists that the guerrilla war against the Peruvian Government has been lost and that his only hope was to negotiate an amnesty agreement with the Government of Peru.

On 12 February 2012, Comrade Artemio was found badly wounded after a clash with troops in a remote jungle region of Peru. President Ollanta Humala said the capture of Artemio, nicknamed Operation Crepúsculo, marked the defeat of the Huallaga faction, located in a central area of cocaine production. President Humala has stated that he would now step up the fight against the remaining bands of Shining Path rebels in the Ene-Apurímac valley. Walter Diaz, the lead candidate to succeed Artemio, was captured on 3 March, further ensuring the disintegration of the Alto Huallaga valley faction. On 3 April 2012, Jaime Arenas Caviedes, a senior leader in the group's remnants in Alto Huallaga Valley who was also regarded to be the leading candidate to succeed Artemio following Diaz's arrest, was captured. After Caviedes, alias "Braulio", was captured, Humala declared that the Shining Path was now unable to operate in the Alto Huallaga Valley. Shining Path rebels carried out an attack on three helicopters being used by an international gas pipeline consortium on 7 October, in the central region of Cusco. According to the military Joint Command spokesman, Col. Alejandro Lujan, no one was kidnapped or injured during the attack. The capture of Artemio effectively ended the war between Shining Path and the Government of Peru.

Comrade Artemio was convicted of terrorism, drug trafficking, and money laundering on 7 June 2013. He was sentenced to life in prison and a fine of $183 million. On 11 August 2013, Comrade Alipio, the Shining Path's leader in the Ene-Apurímac Valley, was killed in a battle with government forces in Llochegua.

On 9 April 2016, on the eve of the country's presidential elections, the Peruvian government blamed remnants of the Shining Path for a guerrilla attack that killed eight soldiers and two civilians. Shining Path snipers killed three police officers in the Ene Apurimac Valley on 18 March 2017.

In a document 400 pages in length recovered from a mid-level Shining Path commander and analyzed by the Counter-Terrorism Directorate (DIRCOTE) of the National Police, the Shining Path planned to initiate operations against the Government of Peru that included killings and surprise attacks beginning in 2021, the bicentennial of Peru's independence. Objectives were created to first attack public officials, then regain lost territory and then finally overthrow the government.

==== VRAEM stronghold ====
Into the 2020s, Shining Path has existed in remaining splinter groups. The main remaining group, called the Militarized Communist Party of Peru (MPCP) of about 300 individuals remained in the Valle de los Ríos Apurímac, Ene y Mantaro (VRAEM) region, reportedly making revenue by escorting cocaine traffickers and are reportedly led by two brothers; Víctor and Jorge Quispe Palomino. The MPCP has attempted to recharacterize themselves to distance itself from the original Shining Path groups that had attacked rural communities in the area, describing Guzmán as a traitor. According to InSight Crime, Shining Path's stronghold in the VRAEM, headquartered in Vizcatán, is a similar strategy as the Revolutionary Armed Forces of Colombia.

Another notable splinter group called the Communist Party of Peru – Red Mantaro Base Committee (PCP-CBMR), which remains loyal to Abimael Guzmán, also operates in the VRAEM region. According to the human rights organization Waynakuna Peru, the PCP-CBMR has infiltrated schools in the area setting up "Popular Schools" to spread the group's propaganda. The group has in the past signed documents with the Communist Party of Ecuador – Red Sun.

Following a five-year intelligence operation that began in 2015 and was codenamed Operation Olimpo, 71 alleged members of the Shining Path's United Front and People's Guerrilla Army were arrested on 2 December 2020. Alfredo Crespo, the secretary general of MOVADEF and Guzmán's former lawyer, was included among those arrested. Operation Olimpo included 752 military personnel and 98 government prosecutors that utilized evidence obtained through wiretapping, undercover agents and surveillance. Those arrested were charged with operating shell operations to initiate terrorist activities in Callao and Lima.

== In popular culture ==
American hard rock band Guns N' Roses quotes a speech by a Shining Path officer in their 1990 song "Civil War", as saying "We practice selective annihilation of mayors and government officials, for example, to create a vacuum, then we fill that vacuum. As popular war advances, peace is closer."

American rock band Rage Against the Machine released a music video for their 1993 song "Bombtrack" as a response to the arrest of Abimael Guzmán the previous year. The video expresses support for Guzmán and the Shining Path, featuring various clips of the organization's activities, as well as showing the band in a cage to mimic Guzmán's imprisonment.

American post-hardcore band At The Drive In references Shining Path and their struggle against the Peruvian state in the song "Chanbara" off of their 1998 album In/Casino/Out.

In 2024, Peruvian-born filmmaker Alex Fischman Cárdenas directed Ovejas y Lobos (Sheep and Wolves), a live action short film about Rosa Pumuahuanca, a single mother who searches for her son, Félix, when he mysteriously vanishes during the Shining Path's reign of terror. Fischman Cárdenas dedicates Ovejas y Lobos to the Shining Path's disappeared victims and their families.

=== Other fictional depictions ===
- The Vision of Elena Silves: A Novel by Nicholas Shakespeare
- The Dancer Upstairs: A Novel by Nicholas Shakespeare, ISBN 0-385-72107-2.
- Strange Tunnels Disappearing by Gary Ley, ISBN 1-85411-302-X.
- The Evening News, by Arthur Hailey, ISBN 0-385-50424-1.
- Death in the Andes, by Mario Vargas Llosa, ISBN 0-14-026215-6.
- War Cries, a first-season episode of JAG.
- Escape from L.A. a movie starring Kurt Russell
- Red April: a novel by Santiago Roncagliolo
- The Intelligent Homosexual's Guide to Capitalism and Socialism with a Key to the Scriptures, a play by Tony Kushner

== See also ==
- Communism in Peru
- Definitions of terrorism
  - Communist terrorism
    - Left-wing terrorism
- List of designated terrorist groups
- Three Martyrs of Chimbote
