= Óscar Ramírez Durand =

Peruvian terrorist (born 1953)

Leader of the Shining Path
- In office 12 September 1992 – 14 July 1999
- Preceded by: Abimael Guzmán
- Succeeded by: Comrade Artemio

Personal details
- Born: 16 March 1953 (age 73) Arequipa, Peru
- Party: Shining Path
- Relations: Vladimiro Montesinos (cousin)
- Criminal information
- Convictions: Treason; Terrorism
- Penalty: Life in prison reduced to 24 years

Óscar Ramírez Durand (born 16 March 1953), commonly known as Comrade Feliciano (Spanish: Camarada Feliciano), is a Peruvian convicted terrorist and former political leader who led the Shining Path, a Marxist–Leninist–Maoist revolutionary group in Peru, in the 1990s.

== Biography ==
Ramírez is the son of a retired Peruvian general and the second of seven brothers. Being studious from a young age and enjoying mental challenges such as chess, Ramírez was awarded the medal of academic excellence from the College of Saint Francis of Assisi in Arequipa, Peru. He dropped out of engineering school and joined Shining Path, where he served as a military strategist.

Ramírez assumed control of the Shining Path after Abimael Guzmán was captured by the authorities in 1992. He rejected Guzmán's plea for the rebels to lay down their arms and continued the conflict. He travelled to Colombia where he worked with members of FARC and under his leadership, Shining Path activities increased in south central region of Peru. Two small town mayors were murdered and recruitment efforts among the rural poor of the region increased.

== Imprisonment ==
In 1999, President Alberto Fujimori ordered a military operation in central Peru to capture Ramírez alive and eliminate the last remnants of Shining Path. Over 2,000 army troops were deployed to the region, where they engaged in sporadic fire fights with Shining Path forces. A female guerrilla, starving due to being cut off from all food and supplies, surrendered and provided information on Ramírez's whereabouts, and with this information, he was captured without incident in July 1999. He was transported to a military base where he was interrogated by Vladimiro Montesinos, the head of National Intelligence Service (SIN).

In August 1999, he was prosecuted by a military court that sentenced him to life in prison without the chance for parole in a high security prison at a naval base in Lima.

In June 2006, Ramírez was sentenced to 24 years in prison in a civilian trial. He is currently being held at the naval base in Callao and is due for release in June 2023.

His reduced sentence was a result of his collaboration with the authorities and enmity towards Guzmán: in 2003 he described him to Caretas magazine as a "psychopath" and said that Guzmán "was always a coward and a traitor". He went as far as declaring, before the Truth and Reconciliation Commission, his renewed belief in democracy, his call for remaining subversives to lay down their arms, his expectation for new civilian trials and his condolences for the victims of the conflict. Caretas has also published extracts from his conversations with the former head of the National Intelligence Service, Vladimiro Montesinos, in which family links between the two emerged, both being cousins.

In March 2013, he testified in the trial of the recently imprisoned leader, Comrade Artemio. During the hearing, he apologized to the country for the crimes committed by Shining Path.
