= Valle de los Ríos Apurímac, Ene y Mantaro =

Geopolitical area of Peru

- VRAEM
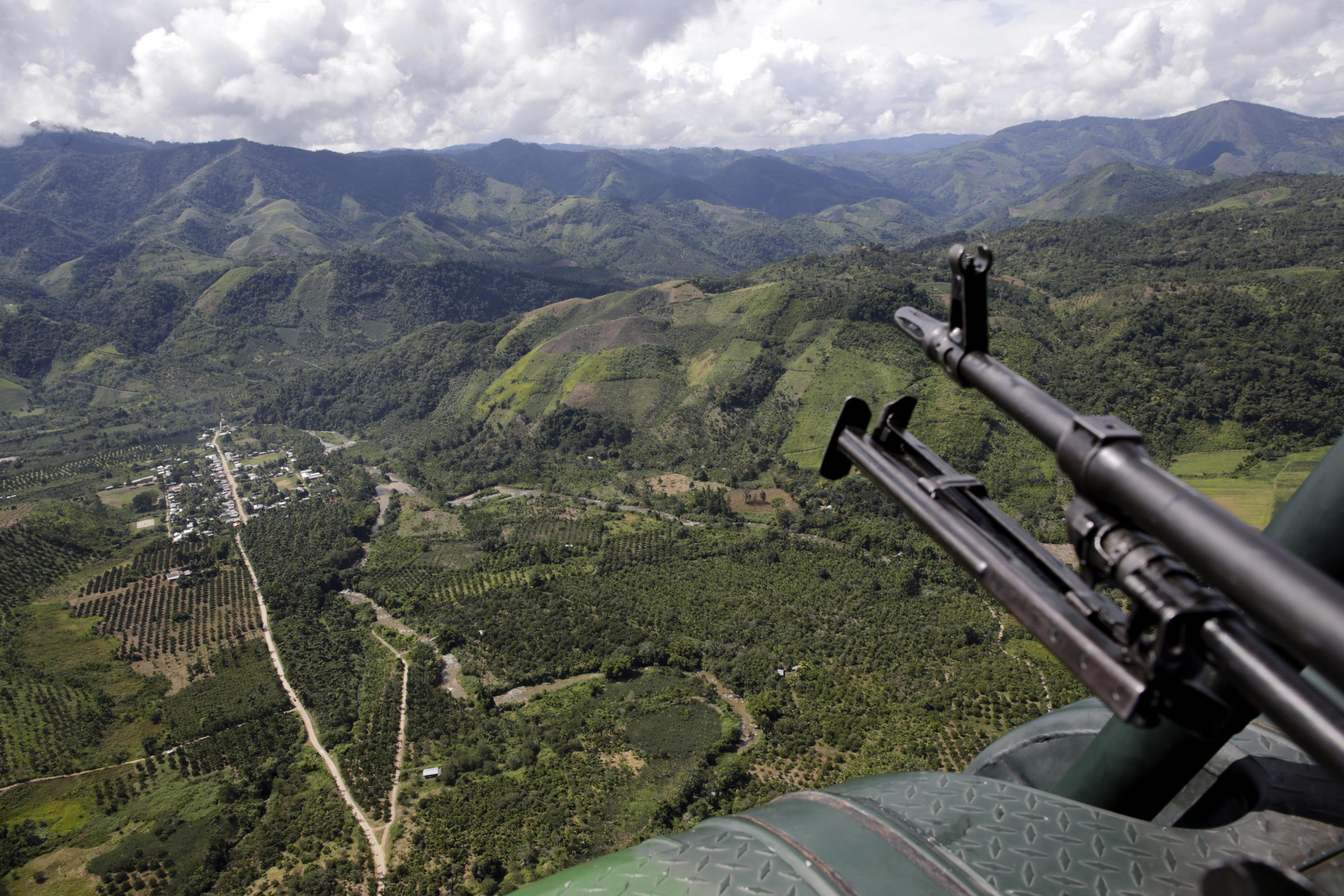
- Overlooking the VRAEM

- Location within Peru

Naming
- English translation: Valley of the Apurímac, Ene and Mantaro rivers

Geography
- Country: Peru
- Coordinates: 11.7°S 74°W

Location
- Interactive map of Valle de los Ríos Apurímac, Ene y Mantaro

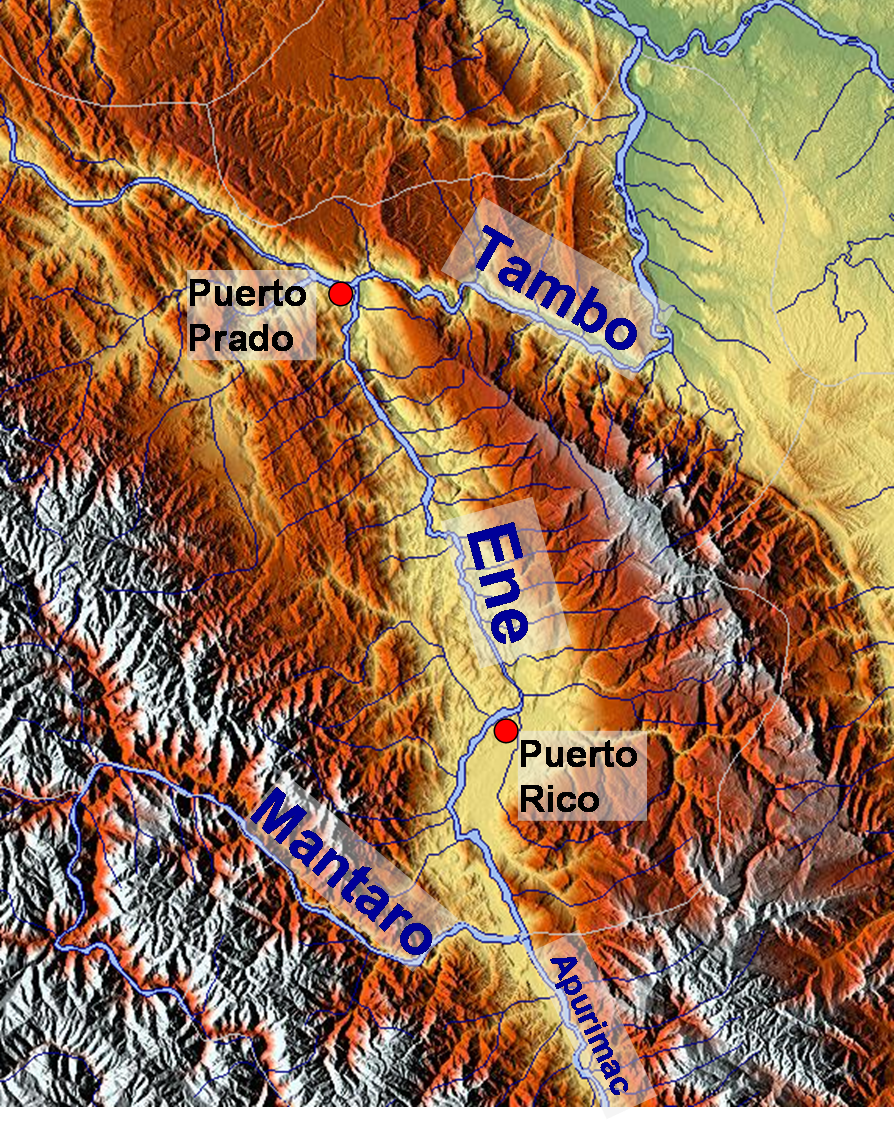
Map of the Valle del ríos Apurímac, Ene y Mantaro

Active areas of the Shining Path guerillas, currently active mostly in the VRAEM

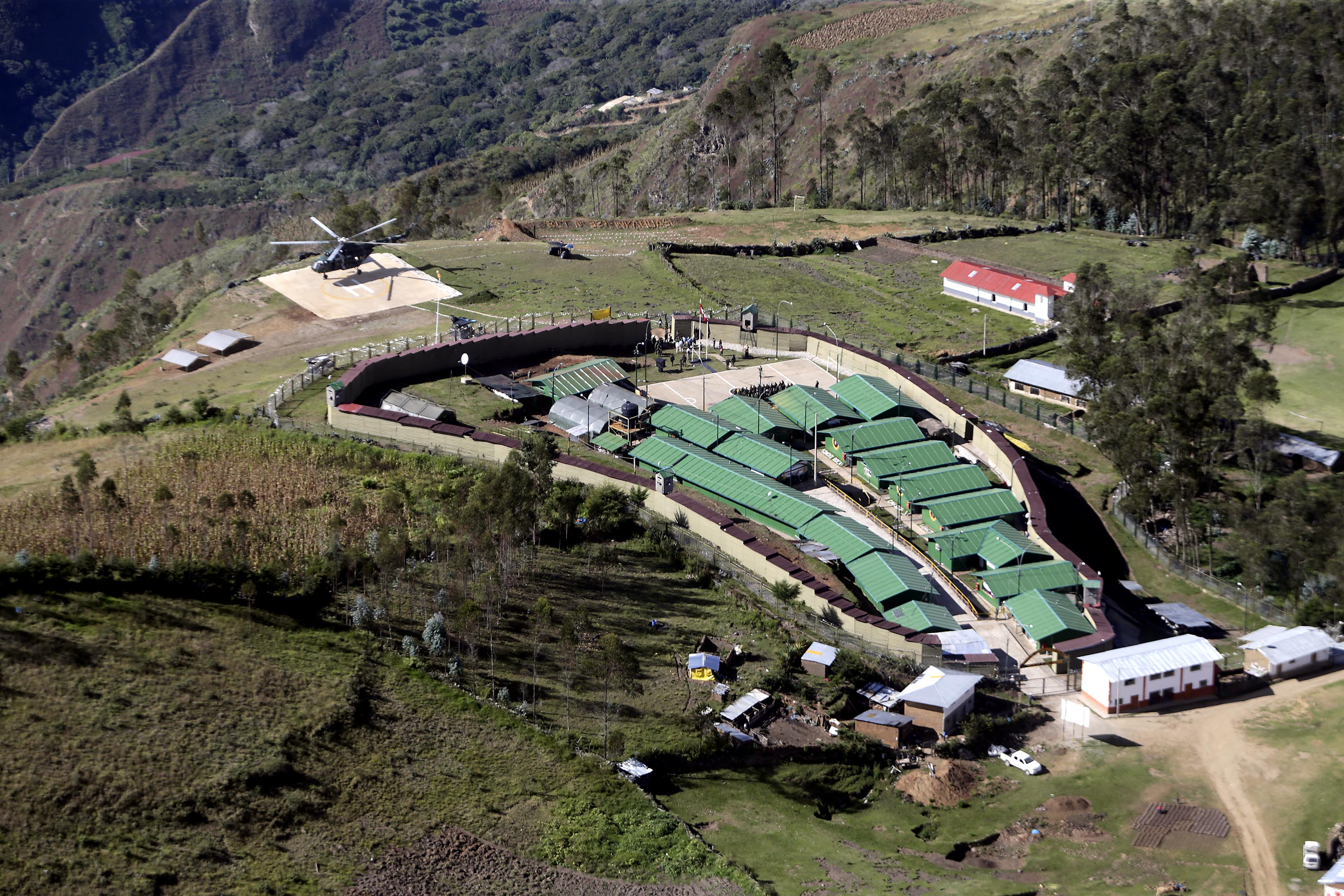
A military base in the VRAEM

The Valle de los Ríos Apurímac, Ene y Mantaro (lit. 'Valley of the Apurímac, Ene and Mantaro rivers'), also known as the VRAEM, is a geopolitical area in Peru, located in portions of the departments of Ayacucho, Cusco, Huancavelica, and Junin. It is one of the major areas of coca production in Peru. It is also the center of operation of the far-left guerrilla group Shining Path.

The area is extremely poor. The VRAEM is an area of such high childhood malnutrition and poverty that the government of Peru selected the VRAEM to launch its National Strategy for Growth program in 2007.

== Cocaine production ==
In 2010, Peru overtook Colombia as the world's largest cocaine-producing country, although Colombia still led in total hectares of coca grown. With local incomes below $10/day, the valleys are used to produce raw paste product, and much of the drug trade is controlled by the Shining Path. With an estimated 19,700 hectares (49,000 acres) of production area in 2010, it was the world's densest area of cocaine production. Paste product is shipped out of the valleys by armed native backpackers to Cuzco, and then onward shipped to either: the Pacific Ocean ports; the Bolivian border, where it is sold to one of the drug cartels; or to mule-traffickers who ship the product onwards via scheduled air transport to Europe and North America.

== See also ==
- Sivia
- Pichari
