= Assassination of Juan Carlos Vega Llona =

1988 murder in La Paz, Bolivia

- Part of the Internal conflict in Peru
- Location: Cotahuma, La Paz, Bolivia
- Date: December 6, 1988
- Target: Juan Carlos Vega Llona
- Attack type: Assassination
- Deaths: 1
- Victim: 1
- Perpetrator: Shining Path
- Assailants: 2

On December 6, 1988, Juan Carlos Vega Llona (born February 20, 1942, in Lima) was assassinated one block away from the Peruvian embassy in the district of Cotahuma, La Paz, Bolivia, by armed members of the fictitious "Revolutionary Workers Movement" (Spanish: Movimiento Obrero Revolucionario, MOR), created in name by Shining Path, a Peruvian terrorist organisation. The murder of the embassy's naval attaché was carried out in reprisal for the Peruvian prison massacres that took place two years prior.

== Background ==
Juan Carlos Vega Llona was born on February 20, 1942, in Lima. He entered the Naval Academy in 1959, graduating in 1964. In 1984, he was sent to Ayacucho, then an "Emergency Zone" (Spanish: Zona de Emergencia), where he commanded the Peruvian Navy's infantry post in Huanta. In 1986, during the first presidency of Alan García, prisoners accused of terrorism who were held in El Frontón rioted coordinated with the prisoners of the San Juan de Lurigancho and Santa Bárbara prisons. After the failure of the negotiations, a plan was drawn up to regain control of the prisons. Vega Llona was in charge of the operation in El Frontón along with Luis Giampietri Rojas. The operations to retake the prisons left hundreds dead due to the clashes that occurred.

== Assassination ==
In 1987, Captain Vega Llona was assigned as naval attaché to the embassy of Peru in La Paz, Bolivia. After the setback suffered by the events of El Frontón, the Central Committee of Shining Path commissioned the execution of Vega Llona to an annihilation group commanded by Tania Tineo Suasnábar (Comrade Rosa). Other members of the annihilation group were Teófilo Ayma Sayco (Comrade Tomás), and Cipriano Quilla Carcausto (Comrade Saúl).

On December 2, 1988, Mario Serafín Cuentas Alvarado (Comrade Adrián), met with "Comrade Rosa" at the house of "Comrade Margarita" informing her that he had to travel to La Paz. "Comrade Adrián" gave her revolvers, dynamite and leaflets from the "Revolutionary Workers' Movement" (Spanish: Movimiento Obrero Revolucionario, MOR), a fictitious organization created with the aim of misleading potential investigators. The next day, the annihilation group traveled to Bolivia. On December 4, the perpetrators carried out a reconnaissance of the place, a procedure that was repeated the next day. During the reconnaissance, the senderistas stole twice. At the same time, the annihilation group came into contact with the Support Committee for the Peruvian Revolution (CARP-Bolivia) led by "Comrade Rufo", a Bolivian senderista. The CARP-Bolivia provided accommodation for the Peruvian senderistas in El Alto.

On December 6, 1988, while Vega Llona was walking down 6 de Agosto Avenue in the direction of the embassy, he was stopped due to a group of passersby who interrupted his path while attempting to board a microbus 10 metres before the avenue's intersection with Aspiazu avenue. At that moment, one of the terrorists shot him in the back while another was in charge of neutralizing the passers-by. Vega Llona, already on the ground, tried to draw his gun but was killed by a bullet to the head. After the murder, the perpetrators threw down the MOR leaflets and fled through the streets of La Paz.

In 1989, "Comrade Rosa" was arrested by the Directorate against Terrorism (DIRCOTE). In her testimony, "Comrade Rosa" did not reveal the participation of CARP-Bolivia in the murder, although it would later be revealed. On the other hand, Vega Llona was posthumously promoted to the rank of Counter admiral.

== See also ==
- Peruvian prison massacres
