= Antonio Díaz Martínez =

- Born: 3 May 1933; Chota, Peru
- Died: 19 June 1983 (aged 53); Lima, Peru
- Political party: Communist Party of Peru – Shining Path
- Spouse: Elsa Medina (m. 1959; died 1970) Catherine Adrianzen (m. 1970s)

Antonio Díaz Martínez (May 3, 1933 – June 19, 1986) was a Peruvian agronomist, anthropologist, and Maoist revolutionary, considered a terrorist by the Peruvian government.

He worked at the Agrarian Reform Institute of Peru and was a professor at the National University of San Cristóbal de Huamanga, in Ayacucho.

Martinez later became a senior member of the Communist Party of Peru – Shining Path (PCP-SL) until his arrest by Peruvian authorities on 16 December 1983. He was extrajudicially executed during the Peruvian prison massacres after an uprising of Shining Path prisoners held in the prisons of San Juan de Lurigancho and El Frontón.

== Biography ==
=== Early life ===
Antonio Díaz Martínez was born on 3 May 1933 in Chota, the capital of Chota Province, in the region Cajamarca, about 1,000 km (620 mi) south of Lima. He was born the third son of a middle-class family of seven. Martínez's father was a philosophy professor who, due to his participation in the Peruvian social movements of the 1930s, was heavily persecuted for a period; something which was a source of pride for young Antonio.

After reaching adulthood Martínez attended the National Agrarian University of La Molina near Lima, graduating in 1957. After receiving his degree, he worked for three years as a researcher for the Inter-American Development Service. During this time while completing his thesis Martinez was first brought to the Ayacucho, the same region which would later provide the cradle for the Shining Path's insurgency.

=== Travels abroad and ideological evolution ===
Starting in 1960, Martínez was hired for three years as an official at the Institute for Agrarian Reform and Colonization, to supervise work on planned development projects near the Apurimac River. Towards the end of this period he is given the opportunity to briefly travel to Switzerland, Spain, Chile, and Egypt for the purpose of his research, however by the mid-1960s these experiences had led Martínez to grow increasingly disillusioned with state sponsored development and land reform and proved to be an important factor in his political evolution.

Following his return to Peru in 1964, Martínez joined the agronomy faculty at the University of Huamanga where Abimael Guzman was already in the process of consolidating the pro-Chinese faction of the Peruvian Communist Party, of which an offshoot would later form the Shining Path. It was while immersed in this political climate at the university that Martínez published his seminal work in 1969, Ayacucho: Hambre y Esperanza. Martínez built the book through a blend of colloquial descriptions, dialogue with local people, and general anecdotes from his travels across Ayacucho between 1965 and 1969.

Following the death of his first wife, Elsa Medina, in 1970 Martínez meets his second spouse, Catalina Adrianzen, later that same year after she is hired as a professor by the University of Huamanga. In 1972 Martínez and Adrianzen made some short trips through South America, including Argentina, Uruguay, Paraguay, Bolivia, and Ecuador.

After making contact with the Chinese embassy in 1974, Martínez and Adrianzen expressed their desire to learn about the transformation of agriculture in China following the Cultural Revolution. The couple managed to get hired for the period of 1974–76, Martínez worked for the Spanish Section of Foreign Languages Press, and Adrianzen as a professor. During this period of travel in China, Martínez was reported to have received political-military training from the Chinese government, and underwent further ideological alignment towards Maoist ideology having seen its implementation firsthand during the twilight years of the Cultural Revolution. Martínez would return to Ayacucho in 1976, for the next four he would keep a relatively low profile, offering classes and study trips at the University of Huamanga, and publishing articles often through pseudonym. Many of his presentations during this period focused on the application of his experiences with land reform in China to the agrarian problem within Peru. In 1978, Martínez would publish his reflections on these experiences in revolutionary China, as China: La revolución agraria.

=== Insurgency and death ===
Despite the party's initiation of militant actions in May 1980 and Martínez's high ranking position within the leadership of the Shining Path, he continued with his socio-economic studies of the Peruvian countryside until his arrest in December 1983 under charges of terrorism. By 1985, Martínez was acquitted of all charges by the 12th correctional court due to lack of evidence. Despite this, Martínez remained in prison and shortly after was transferred from “el Sexto” to Lurigancho Prison. Early in the morning of June 18 1986, Shining Path prisoners staged simultaneous takeovers at multiple prisons surrounding Lima to protest government attempts to move the prisoners into more secure facilities. President Alan Garcia refused to negotiate, turning the prisons over to the armed forces. At Lurigancho, the police directed mortar and rocket fire into the compound and then stormed the prison, executing both armed and unarmed prisoners. To prevent autopsies, the armed forces buried the corpses in various graveyards around Lima, with Martínez's body being discovered in a shallow grave dug in the Imperial Cemetery of Cañete province, just south of the capital. Only weeks prior to his death, Martínez gave one of the first interviews granted by a Shining Path leader, foreseeing that the army might use opposition to the prison transfer to justify a massacre. Journalist Jose Maria Salcedo quoted as having professed no fear: "Our morale is superior and we take death as a challenge".

== Thought ==
=== Influence on the Shining Path ===
In some aspects Martínez's analysis of rural Ayacucho in Ayacucho: Hambre y Esperanza provided the theoretical backbone for many of the specific ways in which the Shining Path's conceived Peruvian society. Specifically the Senderista claim that despite the 1964 agrarian reform the "semi-feudal" relationship remained dominant within the countryside. This originates in Martínez's 1969 work wherein he concludes that the main problem remained the domination of the latifundio and the entrapment of the peasantry, which were forced into the position of either depending on neighboring haciendas for grazing lands, or as tenant farmers on the large estates. According to Martínez's analysis, the agrarian reform law as introduced by President Fernando Belaúnde hardly affected the department of Ayacucho at all, as the only section which had been applied by the time of Belaúnde's ouster, was Title XV, which gave tenants the preferential right to become owners of the land they were occupying. Despite this Martínez asserted that in most cases the landowner was able to keep the best of their land regardless as the impoverished tenants still had to provide compensation for any occupied land they wanted ownership over. Contrary to claims of the Shining Path refusal to recognize that any changes had occurred in Peruvian society since the time of Mariategui, Martínez's work does not so much conclude that no changes had occurred, but rather that despite the ostensible goals of the agrarian reform, the sorts of changes which were taking place were not in the interests of the peasant population.

Martínez's works also dispel the notion that the Shining Path's goal was to return Peru to an idealized, autarkic, agrarian society modeled on a mixture of the Inca Empire and Khmer Rouge. In his writings it is clear Martínez had no intention of rejecting modern technology, on the contrary he speaks on the importance of technical training and implementation of new techniques in addressing the problems of the Peruvian countryside. His criticisms of university-led development projects found in Ayacucho: Hambre y Esperanza were not based in their use of novel technology or agricultural methods, but rather that the implementation of these changes did not involve the peasantry themselves. Instead the local peasants found specialists ignored the centuries of ecological knowledge their communities had accumulated and imposed themselves as the sole sources of agricultural expertise. His experiences over the course of his research in Ayacucho led Martínez to conclude that all attempts to impose development from above were doomed to fail, and that these failures came to legitimize the view, among development officials and experts, that the indigenous were lazy and unwilling to accept change. However, Martínez would argue that the blame for this failure was instead on the part of the alleged experts, which proved unable to win the trust or support of the local peasantry. This ultimately led him to the view that any fundamental change in the rural areas was impossible without also transforming the whole of Peruvian society, Martínez ends Ayacucho: Hambre y Esperanza with a tightly summarized view of the Shining Path ideology 11 years before the party first issued its demands:

Peru will have to take the socialist road to development, the only road left to the semi-colonial and semi-feudal countries of Latin America

== Works ==
- Ayacucho: Hambre y Esperanza. Martínez, AD. 1969.
- Contribución al Estudio del Latifundio. Martínez, AD. 1970.
- China: La revolución agraria. Martínez, AD. 1978.
