= Callao Bay =

Bay in Peru

- Spanish: Bahía del Callao
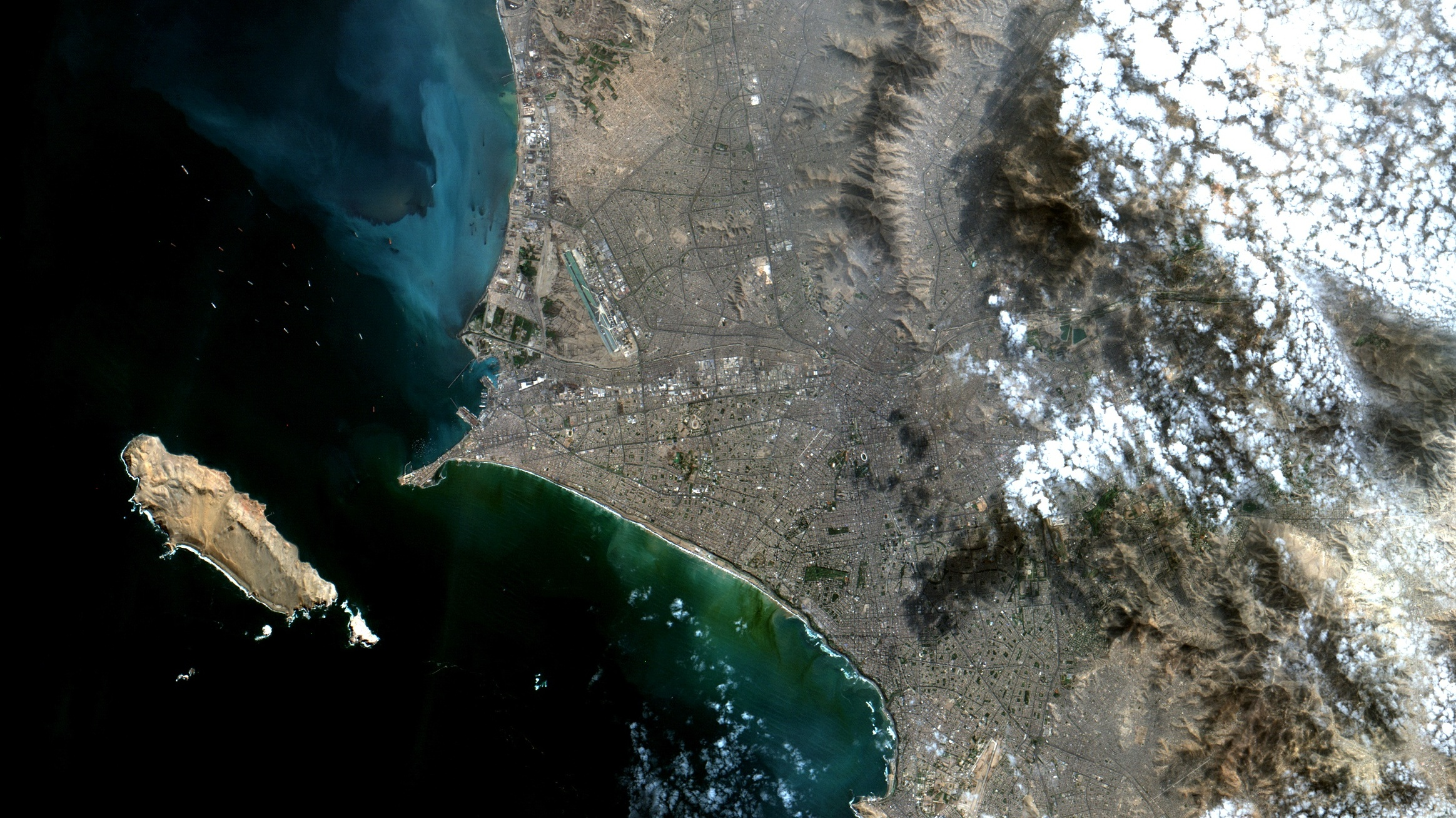
- The bay of Callao (top) and Lima (bottom)
- Interactive map of Callao Bay
- Location: Peru
- Coordinates: 12°03′00″S 77°09′50″W
- Ocean/sea sources: Pacific Ocean
- Settlements: Callao

Callao Bay (Spanish: Bahía del Callao) is a bay located off the coast of Callao, Peru. The islands of San Lorenzo and El Frontón are located to its west.

== Overview ==
The bay is separated from that of Lima by the Peninsula of La Punta. Due to its location, it is a place of great commercial and military importance because it is home to the country's main port and a navy base. The bay is very rich ecologically speaking, which is why the Guano Islands, Islets, and Capes National Reserve System was created, in charge of taking care of the entire bay and the nearby islands.

== See also ==
- Bay of Lima
