= Peninsula of La Punta =

Peninsula in Peru

Coordinates: 12.072°S 77.164°W

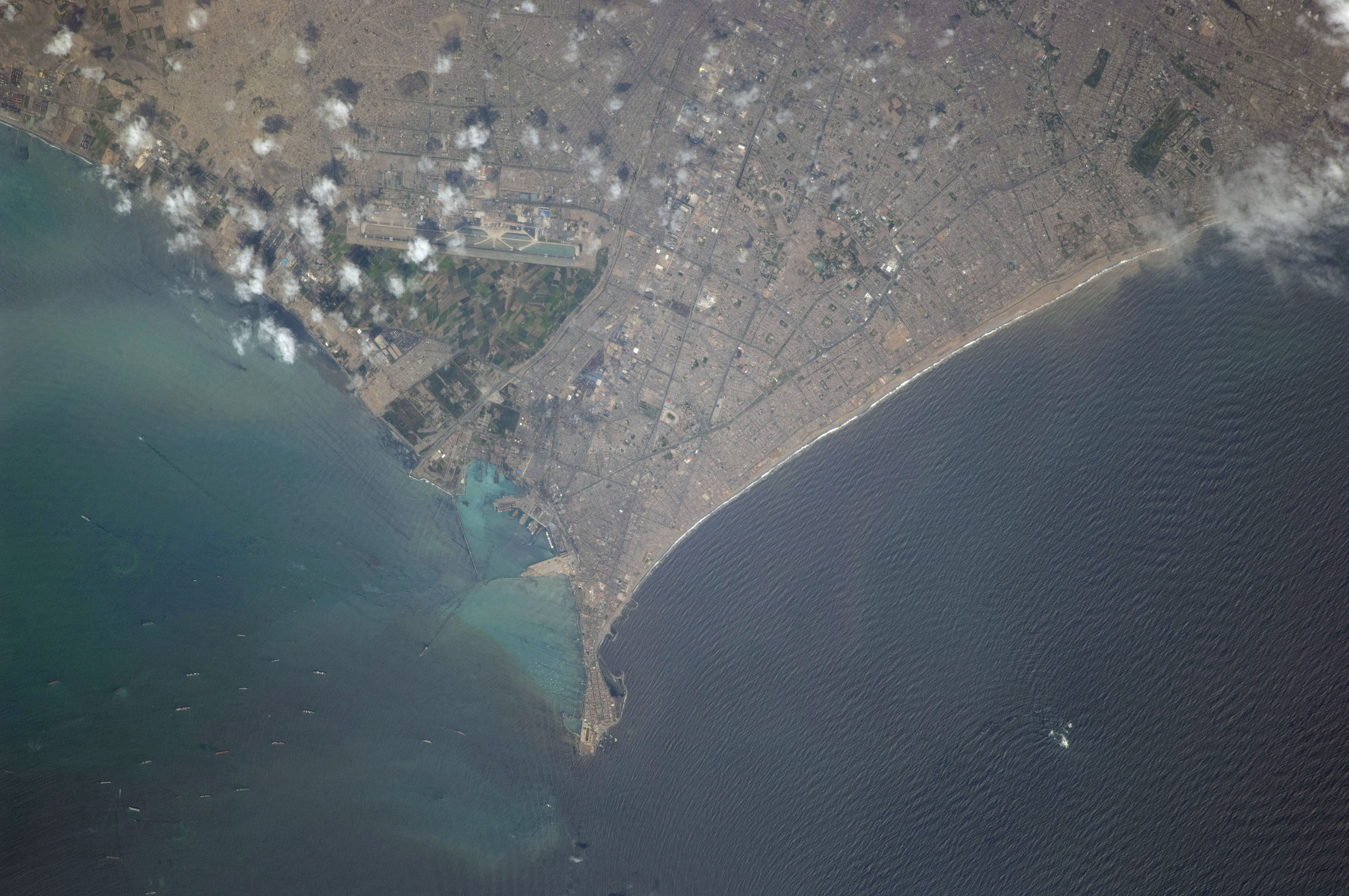
View of the peninsula from the International Space Station.

The Peninsula of La Punta is a peninsula located at the district of the same name in Callao, Peru. It is the point that separates the bays of Miraflores and Callao, both part of the territorial waters of Peru.

== Overview ==
The peninsula in 2026.

The peninsula has an extension of 2 kilometres and is located entirely within the District of La Punta. Likewise, the peninsula is divided into two banks: the north, called Cantolao, where the waters are calm, and the south, called Mar Brava, because of the turbulent waters. Its location makes it the closest continental area to the San Lorenzo and El Frontón islands, just 5 kilometres away.

Within the peninsula is the 3 kilometre Chucuito area, halfway between the peninsula itself and the Real Felipe Fortress, famous for its beaches that are divided between Chucuito and Carpayo.

== See also ==
- Callao
- Callao Bay
- Lima Bay
