= San Jorge Prison =

Former prison in Peru

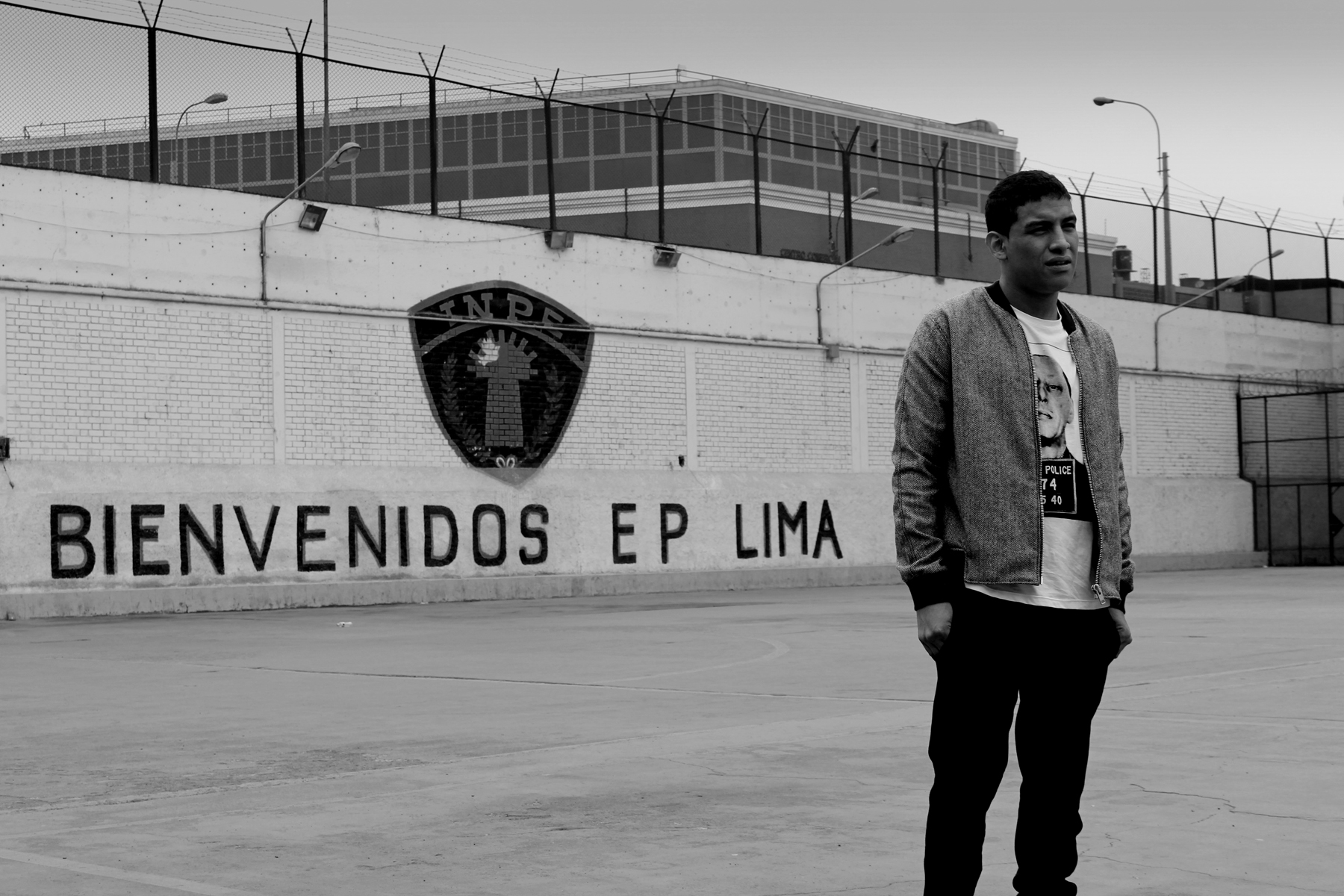
- A man models clothing made in the prison one year prior to its demolition
- Interactive map of San Jorge Prison
- Location: Lima District, Lima, Peru
- Status: Demolished
- Population: 440 (2014)
- Opened: 1980s
- Closed: October 2014
- Managed by: National Penitentiary Institute

San Jorge Prison (Spanish: Penal San Jorge) was a male-only prison located in the fifteenth block of Nicolás de Piérola Avenue, in Lima, Peru. Surrounded by Andahuaylas, Montevideo, Ayacucho and Pasaje Artesanos streets, it was located in the heart of the city.

The prison, which served the destination for first-time offenders for three decades, closed in 2014 after the sale of its terrain for US$ 37 million. In 2015, ProInversión annulled the sale and in 2017 it was transferred to the Judiciary. The buildings have since been demolished and the land is largely vacant.

During the COVID-19 Pandemic in the country, it served as the Temporary Isolation Centre of Lima (Spanish: Centro de Aislamiento Temporal de Lima).

== History ==
During its operation, in the 1980s, it received the prisoners of the El Sexto Prison after the bloody riot that occurred in 1984. In the 1990s it received several prisoners accused of corruption crimes after the fall of Alberto Fujimori's government.

In 2012, the National Penitentiary Institute (INPE) proposed that the prison, as well as Santa Mónica Prison in Chorrillos District, be moved from the urban areas where they are located and be transferred to other locations outside the city. In 2014, its closure was decided with the date of 19 October of that year selected as the date of its definitive closure. The reason was the sale of the land for the construction of a shopping centre. In theory, the buyer would build a prison with greater capacity for the Peruvian State. Although at that time it was said that the inmates would be transferred to a prison in Chincha Province, they were transferred to the Ancón II Prison.

In 2020, within the framework of the COVID-19 pandemic, the Ministry of Justice ordered the temporary use of the prison as a health isolation space for inmates in Lima who were affected or suspected of being infected with the virus. In In 2022, it was reported that a "Flagrancy Unit" would be built on part of the land for the speedy prosecution of common crimes. It was also noted that the rest of the area would be used for the construction of a "Judicial City."

== See also ==
- El Sexto Prison
- Fort of Santa Catalina, Lima
