= Shining Trenches of Combat =

Prison organization in Peru

- Luminosas Trincheras de Combate
- Flag of the Shining Path, which the trenches similarly used.
- Founding leader: Abimael Guzmán
- Dates active: 1980s–1990s
- Country: Peru
- Allegiance: Shining Path
- Ideology: Communism; Marxism–Leninism–Maoism; Gonzalo Thought; Anti-revisionism; Revolutionary socialism
- Status: Dissolved

The Shining Trenches of Combat (Spanish: Luminosas Trincheras de Combate) were Peruvian militant groups organized by the communist Shining Path and purposed to form support bases in prisons that held arrested PCP-SL combatants. Although significantly disruptive to the penal infrastructure, the Shining Trenches ultimately collapsed from government intervention and the general decline in the Shining Path.

== Name ==
The origin of the term Shining Trenches comes from a quotation of Shining Path leader Abimael Guzmán:

"Having become prisoners of war, [combatants] never kneeled but persisted in fighting, mobilizing and producing in ardent struggles; they transformed the sordid dungeons of the outdated and rotten Peruvian State into luminous trenches of combat."

This quote affirms the Shining Path's perception of using the Peruvian carceral system as a space for "resistance and political development."

== Activity ==
The main actions conducted by the organized groups included studying, planning, and coordinating attacks on the state and political opponents. They also performed various cultural performances and artistic expressions to praise Marxism-Leninism-Maoism, Abimael Guzmán, and the People's War.

By 1986, the Shining Path was estimated to have extensive control over prisons across Peru.

=== Prison uprisings ===
Beginning in the 1980s, the Shining Trenches initiated violent insurrections in attempts to gain political leverage against the government. Some examples include:

| Date | Prison(s) | Actions |
|---|---|---|
| December 1983 | Lurigancho, El Frontón, Callao Naval Base | Hostage taking |
| July 1985 | Lurigancho, El Frontón, Callao Naval Base | Hostage taking |
| October 1985 | Lurigancho | Hostage taking |
| June 1986 | Lurigancho, El Frontón, Callao Naval Base | Riot |
| May 1992 | Miguel Castro Castro | Riot |

=== Songs of the Shining Trenches of Combat ===
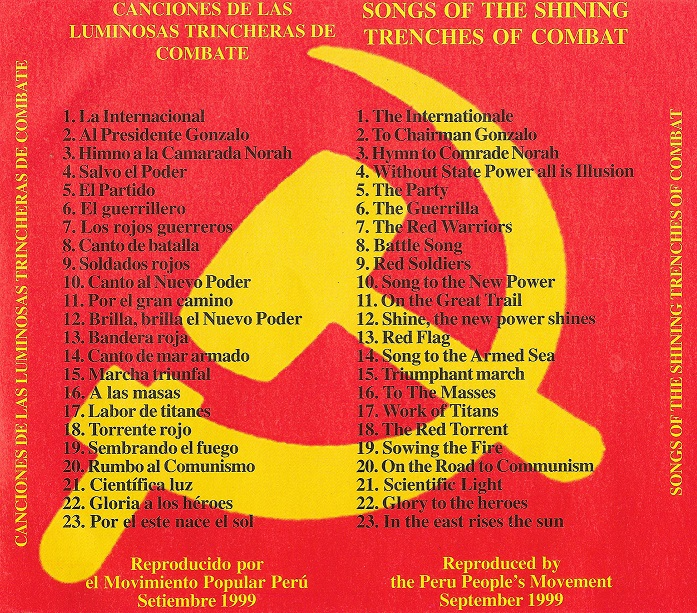
Reverse of the Songs of the Shining Trenches of Combat DVD

Between 1990 and 1992, Shining Path militants imprisoned in Miguel Castro Castro compiled and recorded performances of twenty-three communist songs, many of which were written and popularized within the PCP-SL. Due to the limitations of the prison, equipment was scarce and the audio was low quality.

In 1999, the recordings were then assembled into a CD album titled Songs of the Shining Trenches of Combat (Canciones de las Luminosas Trincheras de Combat) by the Peru People's Movement (MPP), the international relations arm of the Shining Path. That same year, the MPP globally distributed the CD along with a statement:

"With the publication of this Compact Disc, we hope to broaden and strengthen the understanding and support for the people's war in the Peru and political prisoners and prisoners of war"

== Decline ==
The Shining Trenches faced several government retaliations led by the National Police of Peru and the Armed Forces. This increased the crackdown on the groups' operation years later.

Two major interventions include the Peruvian prison riots of June 1986 and Operation Mundaza 1 in May and June 1992, both of which resulted in hundreds of SL prisoner deaths and further scrutinization of inmates. The combination of this factor with the trending decline of the Shining Path in the 1990s eventually brought down the power of the Shining Trenches within the national prisons.

== See also ==
- Shining Path
- Communism in Peru
