= Miss Perú 1991 =

- Date: Apr 20, 1991
- Presenters: Humberto Martínez Morosini
- Venue: Coliseo Cerrado de Arequipa
- Broadcaster: Panamericana Televisión
- Entrants: 24
- Winner: Eliana Martínez; Callao

The Miss Perú 1991 pageant was held on April 20, 1991. That year, 24 candidates were competing for the national crown. The chosen winner represented Peru at the Miss Universe 1991. The rest of the finalists would enter in different pageants.

== Placements ==
Final Results	Contestant
Miss Peru Universe 1991	Callao - Eliana Martínez Márquez
1st Runner-Up	Cuzco - Claudia Figueroa Moy
2nd Runner-Up	Amazonas - Carla Barzotti
3rd Runner-Up	La Libertad - Joanna Castro de la Mata
4th Runner-Up	Region Lima - Alithú Robinson
5th Runner-Up	Arequipa - María Elena Bellido
Top 12	Ica - Lily Eyzaguirre; Lambayeque - Veronica Carranza; Ucayali - Janeth Sacco; La Punta - Mónica Cánepa; Piura - Leslie Stewart; Cajamarca - Rosa Maria Aschiero Perea

== Special awards ==
- Best Regional Costume - Lambayeque - Veronica Carranza
- Miss Photogenic - Piura - Leslie Stewart
- Miss Elegance - Apurímac - Marcela Flores
- Miss Body - Region Lima - Alithú Robinson
- Best Hair - Amazonas - Carla Barzotti
- Miss Congeniality - Cajamarca - Rosa María Aschiero
- Most Beautiful Face - Piura - Leslie Stewart Vega

.

== Delegates ==
- Amazonas - Carla Barzotti
- Áncash - Carmita Andreu Ríos
- Apurímac - Marcela Flores
- Arequipa - María Elena Bellido
- La Libertad - Joanna Castro de la Mata Pinzás
- Cajamarca - Rosa María Aschiero Perea
- Callao - Eliana Martínez Márquez
- Cuzco - Claudia Figueroa Moy
- Huancavelica - Karen Lucich Larrauri
- Ica - Lily Eyzaguirre
- Junín - Blanca Salazar
- La Punta - Mónica Cánepa
- Lambayeque - Veronica Carranza Villarán
- Madre de Dios - Elizabeth Gadea
- Moquegua - Zulma Vázquez Bellot
- Oxapampa - Elba Gálvez
- Pasco - Giorgina Soto Gonzalez
- Piura - Leslie Stewart
- Puno - Milagritos Muñiz García
- Region Lima - Alithu Robinson
- Tacna - Verónica del Valle
- Tumbes - Nancy Lama
- Ucayali - Janeth Sacco
- USA Peru - Frida Ximena Rivera-Schreiber
