= National Penitentiary Institute (Peru) =

Peruvian correctional agency

National Penitentiary Institute Instituto Nacional Penitenciario
- Badge of the National Penitentiary Institute of Peru
- Abbreviation: INPE
- Motto: Mantenimiento del Orden Publico; Maintenance of Public Order

Agency overview
- Formed: 1924
- Legal personality: Governmental: Government agency

Jurisdictional structure
- Operations jurisdiction: Peru
- Population: 104,643 inmates (2018)

Operational structure
- Headquarters: Lima, Peru
- Agency executive: Rubén Rodríguez Rabanal, Director General
- Parent agency: Ministry of Justice (Peru)

Website
- inpe.gob.pe

The National Penitentiary Institute of Peru (Spanish: Instituto Nacional Penitenciario, INPE) is the government agency charged with incarcerating convicts and suspects charged with crimes. It is part of the Peruvian government's Ministry of Justice.

== History ==
The Inspector General of Prisons was first established by Article 26 of the Penal Code of 1924. After becoming Inspector General on March 28, 1928, Dr. Bernardino León y León launched major reforms and changed the title to Director General of Prisons.

== Capacity ==
In 2009, the prison population totaled 44,800 inmates (0.15% of the national population), though the nation's prisons were built for a capacity of 22,540. 2,794 of the inmates were women. Only 17,297 of the inmates have been sentenced in court, while many of the rest are held in pretrial detention at police stations and judiciary buildings. Most pretrial detainees are held with convicted prisoners. Because of understaffing, guards leave the internal operation of large prisons, including the management of commerce, to taitas, the bosses among the inmates. With more prisoners and fewer prison guards and facility room, it also decreases the amount of time, money and space that can be used for programs to help inmates rehabilitate and reintegrate into society; but it increases a risk in security issues

Since 2000, the International Red Cross has been working with Peruvian authorities to help control the widespread transmission of tuberculosis and HIV among the overcrowded prison population.

In 2008, Justice minister Rosario Fernández Figueroa announced a commission to evaluate and recommend a plan to privatize the prison systems under the supervision of INPE. INPE operates 56 of the country's 71 prisons, while the National Police of Peru (PNP) has jurisdiction over the rest.

== Media coverage ==
In 1998, Amnesty International declared Lori Berenson a political prisoner, bringing worldwide attention to the prison system of Peru. She was sentenced to life imprisonment for treason because of her association with the Túpac Amaru Revolutionary Movement. As the conditions of her incarceration were widely reported, she was transferred from Yanamayo prison high in the Andes, to Socabaya prison, Huacariz prison, and finally Santa Mónica women's prison in Chorrillos until she was conditionally paroled in May 2010, after stating that joining the revolutionary group was a mistake. Following public outcry over her early release, her parole was revoked on August 16, 2010, and she was returned to prison with her baby son. In Peru, young children are permitted to be incarcerated with their mothers until the age of 3. Berenson was again granted conditional parole in November 2010.

In February 2008, television stations broadcast parts of the "Melodies of Freedom" talent competition which was held between prisons across Lima. The winning inmate won a guitar, trophy, and a pair of shoes.

=== Miguel Castro Castro prison ===
On June 11, 2010, Miguel Castro Castro prison in San Juan de Lurigancho, Lima, became the subject of a media circus when it was assigned Joran van der Sloot, who is accused of the murder of Stephany Tatiana Flores Ramírez. The prison's previous director was gunned down outside his home in retaliation for his disciplinary measures and the prison itself is named after the warden of another facility who was slain by Shining Path rebels in 1985. Unlike other Peruvian prisons, the general population at Miguel Castro Castro is not permitted to circulate freely and inmates are restricted to individual buildings within the prison. A courthouse was built on the prison grounds to reduce the risk of escape attempts while transporting inmates to judicial hearings.

On August 23, 2010, the Office of Internal Affairs began administrative and disciplinary action when Peruvian television network América Televisión aired a picture of Joran van der Sloot with three other inmates that had been taken with official photographic equipment at Miguel Castro Castro prison. The photo included Van der Sloot casually posing with Colombian hitman Hugo Trujillo Ospina, accused of the contract killing of Peruvian entrepreneur Myriam Fefer, and American William Trickett Smith II, accused of killing and dismembering his Peruvian wife. Van der Sloot and Smith have been referred to by local media as "the foreigners accused of the most talked-about assassinations in our country."

In September 2010, Dutch crime reporter Peter R. de Vries visited the prison while accompanied by a documentary crew and Beth Holloway, whose daughter Natalee was last seen with Van der Sloot in Aruba before disappearing in 2005. According to Peruvian television program 24 Horas, Holloway spoke with Van der Sloot briefly before he cancelled the meeting because his attorney was not present. Holloway was removed from the prison after a hidden camera was reportedly discovered by the guards. A penitentiary institute spokesperson stated that Holloway's name was not found in the prison's visitor registry. Representatives for Holloway and De Vries denied that a hidden camera was involved nor was anything seized. However, the video premiered in November 2010 on SBS6 in the Netherlands and CBS in the United States, resulting in the suspension of Miguel Castro Castro prison warden Alex Samamé Peña.

=== San Pedro prison ===
San Pedro prison, also located at San Juan de Lurigancho, is one of Peru's largest and most overcrowded facilities with 11,500 inmates in a space for 2,500. In August 2010, Dutch drug trafficker Jackson Conquet killed 22-year-old girlfriend Leslie Dayán Paredes Silva while she visited him at the prison for sex. He wrapped her remains in a blanket and attempted to conceal it with brick and mortar, but guards were alerted by the odor of decomposition. Prison officials stated that monitoring the inmate population is difficult, because 14,000 people pass through the prison each day.

== Prisons ==
Prison	Location	Inmates	Notable inmates
Challapalca	Puno Province	95	Joran van der Sloot
El Frontón	El Frontón Island, Callao	—	Fernando Belaúnde Terry (released), Hugo Blanco (expelled)
El Sepa	Loreto Region	—	
Huacariz	Cajamarca	—	Lori Berenson (transferred)
Miguel Castro Castro (Canto Grande)	San Juan de Lurigancho, Lima	2,300	Hugo Trujillo Ospina, Joran van der Sloot (transferred), William Trickett Smith II
Piedras Gordas	Ancón, Lima	—	Antauro Humala, Joran van der Sloot (transferred)
San Lorenzo Naval Base	San Lorenzo Island, Callao	—	Abimael Guzmán, Vladimiro Montesinos, Víctor Polay, Óscar Ramírez
San Pedro	San Juan de Lurigancho, Lima	11,500	Ángel Díaz Balbín, Jason Sanford Staling Conquet
Santa Bárbara	Lima	—	
Santa Mónica	Chorrillos, Lima Province	—	Lori Berenson (paroled), Keiko Fujimori (Pretrial detention)
Socabaya	Socabaya, Arequipa Province	—	Lori Berenson (transferred)
Yanamayo	Puno Province		

Strict drug law became more prominent in the 1980s. In some areas, the mandatory minimum is up to 30 years for drug offenses, leaving the prisons continuously over-full at all times. The strict drug laws came into play during the "War on Drugs" because the U.S. was enforcing the movement and, in return, supplying the countries with economic aid. To reduce the overpopulation rate, the plan was to remove mandatory minimums and pre-trial detention for low-level offenders. The 1988 protocol stated that the State parties must report production, sales, or delivery of any drug or narcotic, as well as consumption, possession, and purchasing. The U.S. began an annual certification process to make sure that these Latin American countries were participating properly. If they are not properly following all conditions, all U.S. supplied aid is removed. Peru was then forced to be stricter on the drug regulations to keep up with the requirements formed by the U.S. Peru's drug related offenses are established in the Criminal Code of 1991. Contradictory to all of this, possession of drugs for personal use is not considered a crime but is up to judicial determination. Therefore, many individuals are sent to prison for completing a crime that isn't truly a crime, spiking the overpopulation rate. Most of these individuals reside in the group of pre-trial detainees for quite some time. They are kept at this point because it strips them of their right to liberty and security, and in the long run, can prevent them from finding justice. Peru claims to do this to prevent criminals from re-offending.

== See also ==
- Peruvian prison massacres
