= Miss Perú 1952 =

- Date: June 7, 1952
- Presenters: Pepe Ludmir
- Venue: Club Lawn Tennis de la Exposición, Jesús María District, Lima
- Entrants: 17
- Placements: 6
- Winner: Ada Gabriela Bueno; Apurímac

On May 31, 1952, Peru received a formal invitation to participate in the first Miss Universe pageant, which was held on June 28 that year at the Long Beach Municipal Auditorium in Long Beach, California, United States. Immediately the National Committee made a press conference to choose candidates from different districts, cities and regions of Peru in a week. The Special Awards were chosen on the Preliminary show, on June 3, from Biarritz Theatre.

The Miss Perú 1952 pageant was held on June 7, 1952. Seventeen candidates competed for the national crown.

== Placements ==
Final results	Contestant
Miss Peru Universe 1952	Apurímac - Ada Gabriela Bueno Böttger
1st Runner-up	Callao - Gabriella García-Arrese
2nd Runner-up	San Isidro - Gloria Sasin
Top 6	La Punta - Elisa Scheelje; Andahuaylas - Beatriz Jerí; Cajamarca – Elisa Castro

== Special awards ==
- Miss Photogenic - Callao - Gabriella García-Arrese (voted by press reporters)
- Miss Congeniality - Pisco - Herminia Roldán
- Miss Elegance - Andahuaylas - Beatriz Jerí

== Delegates ==
- Áncash - Lucila Cristiana Florian
- Andahuaylas - Beatriz Jerí
- Apurímac - Ada Gabriela Bueno
- Barranco - Melissa Mendez Rodena
- Cajamarca - Elisa Castro
- Callao - Gabriella García-Arrese
- Chorrillos - Diana Beatriz Carozzi
- Cuzco - Celia Velazco
- Distrito Capital - Angelica Olazabal
- Ica - Raquel Mercedes Uribe
- Lambayeque - Myriam Soriano
- La Punta - Elisa Scheelje
- Loreto - Dora Canales
- Miraflores - Marcela Alvarado
- Pisco - Herminia Roldán
- San Isidro - Gloria Sasin
- Tumbes - Alida Farfan

.
