= Miss Perú 1979 =

- Date: June 26, 1979
- Presenters: Jorge Belevan
- Venue: Teatro Municipal (Lima)
- Broadcaster: América Televisión
- Entrants: 22
- Winner: Jacqueline Brahms; Lima Region

The Miss Perú 1979 pageant was held on June 26, 1979. That year, 22 candidates were competing for the two national crowns. The chosen winners represented Peru at the Miss Universe 1979 and Miss World 1979. The rest of the finalists would enter in different pageants.

== Placements ==
Final Results	Contestant
Miss Peru Universe 1979	Region Lima - Jacqueline Brahms
Miss World Peru 1979	Distrito Capital – Magali Pérez-Godoy
Miss Maja Peru 1979	La Punta - Ethel Prato Arias-Schreiber
1st Runner-Up	Europe Perú - Cecilia Iversen
2nd Runner-Up	Huánuco - Eli Cuculiza Merino
Top 10	San Isidro - Carla Peralta Prentice; Tingo María - Lyana Leiva; Callao - Mónica Klinkemberger; Arequipa - Michelle Eguren Neuenswander; Cieneguilla - Graciela Eyzaguirre

== Special awards ==
- Best Regional Costume - Lambayeque - Hella Tomasini
- Miss Photogenic - Region Lima - Jacqueline Brahms
- Miss Body - Distrito Capital – Magali Pérez-Godoy
- Best Hair - Europe Perú - Cecilia Iversen
- Miss Congeniality - Cieneguilla - Graciela Eyzaguirre
- Miss Elegance - San Isidro - Carla Peralta

.

== Delegates ==
- Amazonas - María del Carmen Perales
- Áncash - María Teresa Nuñez
- Arequipa - Michelle Eguren Neuenswander
- Callao - Mónica Klinkemberger
- Cieneguilla - Graciela Eyzaguirre
- Cuzco - Myriam Del Castillo
- Distrito Capital - Magali Pérez-Godoy
- Europe Perú - Cecilia Iversen
- Huánuco - Eli Cuculiza Merino
- Ica - Mónica Espinoza Arredondo
- Junín - Lisi Krasl Murga
- La Punta - Ethel Prato Arias-Schreiber
- Lambayeque - Hella Tomasini
- Loreto - Carmen Vásquez Vela
- Mollendo - Sonia Caballero
- Piura - Danitza Ramos
- Region Lima - Jacqueline Brahms
- San Isidro - Carla Peralta Prentice
- Tacna - Lizbeth Boluarte
- Tingo María - Lyana Leiva
- Trujillo - Alicia Mantilla Mayer
- USA Perú - Patricia Sinclair
