= Miss Perú 1953 =

- Date: June 26, 1953
- Presenters: Pepe Ludmir
- Venue: Teatro Municipal (Lima)
- Entrants: 37
- Winner: Mary Ann Sarmiento; Ucayali

The first participation of Peru in Miss Universe pageant created great expectations for the following year among the Peruvians, the newspaper La Crónica takes the rights over the MU franchise and the private clubs and associations from different districts, cities and regions of Peru start to choose candidates for Miss Peru Pageant 1953.

After casting in many different Peruvian cities, the 37 ladies started to compete and 15 survived the first cut and moved to the semi-finals. Following that they were narrowed down to six finalists. The runners-up and winner were called from this group, who proceeded to the crowning and award show.

The Miss Perú 1953 pageant was held on June 26, 1953. The chosen winner, Mary Ann Sarmiento,

== Placements ==
| Final Results | Contestant |
|---|---|
| Miss Peru Universe 1953 | Ucayali - Mary Ann Sarmiento |
| 1st Runner-Up | Trujillo - Lidia Mantilla Mayer |
| 2nd Runner-Up | La Punta - Zoila Lyons |
| Top 6 | Tingo María - Jessica Del Valle; Pisco - Leonor Monfor Jarufe; Distrito Capital - María Luisa de la Borda |

== Special awards ==
- Miss Elegance - Ucayali - Mary Ann Sarmiento
- Miss Congeniality - Cuzco - Eloisa Guzmán
- Miss Photogenic - Trujillo - Lidia Mantilla Mayer

== Delegates ==
- Amazonas - Vanessa Verelli
- Apurímac - Maria Jose Reyes
- Cajamarca - Jessica Carranza
- Chaclacayo - Martha Elena Quiroga
- Cuzco - Eloisa Guzmán
- Distrito Capital - María Luisa de la Borda
- Ica - Gwendoline Ramos
- Iquitos - Regina Sandoval
- La Punta - Zoila Lyons
- Loreto - Marisela Ocampo
- Pisco - Leonor Monfor Jarufe
- Tacna - Alissa Reséndez
- Tingo María - Jessica Del Valle
- Trujillo - Lidia Mantilla Mayer
- Ucayali - Mary Ann Sarmiento
