= Songs of the Shining Trenches of Combat =

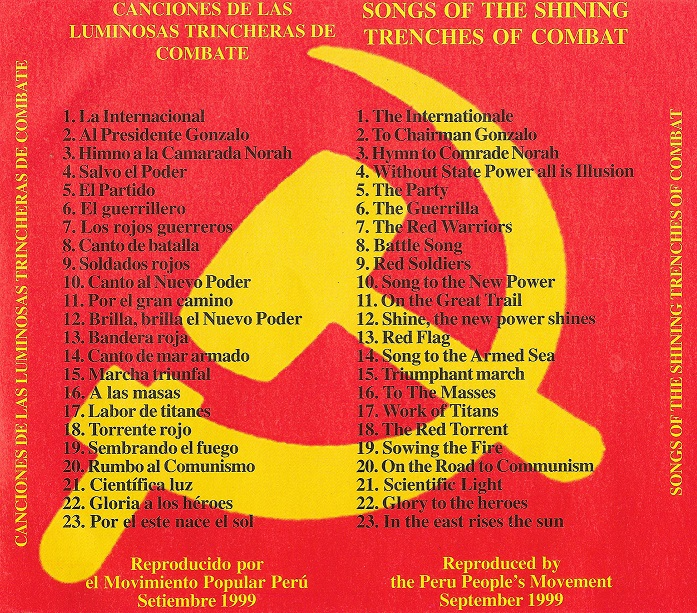

Compilation album by Luminosas Trincheras de Combate
- Released: 1999
- Recorded: 1990–1992
- Genre: Political
- Length: 57:44
- Language: Spanish

Songs of the Shining Trenches of Combat
Album

Songs of the Shining Trenches of Combat is a musical album containing communist songs and hymns written by members of the Shining Path. Published in 1999, it was recorded clandestinely by imprisoned members and sympathizers of the CPP between 1990 and 1992 in the Miguel Castro Castro and the Lurigancho Penitentiary.

It was distributed in 1999 by the Peru People's Movement, as a form of propaganda among the masses. "With the publication of this record we hope to amplify and strengthen the understanding and support of the "people's war" in Peru and the political prisoners and prisoners of war." The album was distributed among Maoist groups outside of Peru, primarily through the Internet.

The title of the album is a reference to the courtyards of the prisons where captured CPP members were held, named "Luminosas Trincheras de Combate" (Shining Trenches of Combat).

== Track listing ==
No.	Title	Length
1.	"The International"	2:49
2.	"To Chairman Gonzalo"	2:07
3.	"Hymn to Comrade Norah"	3:42
4.	"Without State Power, all is Illusion"	2:30
5.	"The Party"	2:38
6.	"The Guerrilla"	2:37
7.	"The Red Warriors"	2:43
8.	"Battle Song"	2:52
9.	"Red Soldiers"	1:47
10.	"Song to the New Power"	2:04
11.	"On the Great Trail"	1:55
12.	"Shine the New Power shines"	3:01
13.	"Red Flag"	2:25
14.	"Song to the Armed Sea"	4:17
15.	"Triumphant March"	3:11
16.	"To the Masses"	2:19
17.	"Work of Titans"	2:23
18.	"The Red Torrent"	2:40
19.	"Sowing the Fire"	2:32
20.	"On the Road to Communism"	2:00
21.	"Scientific Light"	3:04
22.	"Glory to the heroes"	2:00
23.	"In the east rises the sun"	0:58
Total length:		57:44

== See also ==
- Shining Path
- Communism in Peru
