= Peru People's Movement =

- Movimiento Popular Peru
- Logo of the MPP
- Abbreviation: MPP
- Formation: 1996
- Founder: Javier Esparza
- Founded at: Malmö, Sweden
- Legal status: Active (Banned in Peru)
- Purpose: Propagate Gonzalo Thought; Garner support for the Shining Path; Defend the actions of Abimael Guzmán
- Website: https://vnd-peru.blogspot.com/ (current) http://www.redsun.org/mpp.htm (defunct)

The Peru People's Movement (Spanish: Movimiento Popular Peru, MPP) is a Marxist–Leninist-Maoist mass organization formed by members of the Shining Path to spread party propaganda abroad.

== Creation ==
It was founded in Malmö, Sweden by Javier Esparza (brother-in-law of Abimael Guzmán) and later expanded to other countries including Germany, Norway, Spain, and the United States.

== Members ==
The MPP recruited among Peruvian migrants by proposing to help them to fit in their new homelands and with administrative procedures, along with exiled members of Shining Path.

== Actions ==
The main purpose of the MPP was to spread ideological materials and propaganda abroad, with emphasis on drawing international support for the Shining Path's "people's war".

Another purpose was to make links with local Maoist or left-wing parties, whether to propagate propaganda or to try to influence them into the Gonzalo Thought.

Materials include literature, leaflets, posters, and even music. For example, in 1999, the MPP helped create and distribute an album called Songs of the Shining Trenches of Combat from Shining Path prisoners held in Miguel Castro Castro prison. Years before, the Musical Guerrilla Army made tours to perform pro-Shining Path songs.

The organization also led protests against the 1992 capture of Abimael Guzmán, creating the International Emergency Committee to Defend the Life of Abimael Guzman to defend his life from possible execution after he was convicted for committing terrorism.

== Red Sun ==
An MPP artistic piece glorifying Shining Path leader Abimael Guzmán (alias chairman Gonzalo)

The Red Sun is a magazine founded by Shining Path supporters in Denmark, originally named "Red Sun Study Circle" in the 1990s.

The MPP currently collaborates with editing the magazine.

== See also ==
- Augusta La Torre
- Peruvian internal conflict
- Left-wing terrorism
- Support Committees for the Peruvian Revolution
