= Ángel Díaz Balbín =

Peruvian murderer (1955–1986)

- Díaz Balbín in 1986
- Born: 17 April 1955; Callao, Peru
- Died: 9 February 1986 (aged 30); Lima, Peru
- Status: Deceased
- Conviction: Murder × 3 (1976)
- Penalty: 15 years in prison (Note: He was sentenced to 15 years in prison for the murders of his aunt Genoveva Díaz and her two children, served nine years, and was paroled for his good behavior.)

Details
- Victims: 3 murders confirmed; 20+ others suspected
- Span of crimes: 1976 – 1986 (suspected)
- Country: Peru
- Date apprehended: 6 February 1986 (last time)

Ángel Díaz Balbín (17 April 1955 – 9 February 1986), nicknamed the Lima Ripper or the Vampire of Breña, was a Peruvian convicted murderer and suspected serial killer who murdered possibly more than 20 people between 1976 and 1986.

Díaz Balbín was killed during interrogation by psychologist Mario Poggi, who was outraged at both the nature of Díaz Balbín's alleged later crimes and the inability to get a confession from him.

== Early life and family murders ==
Díaz Balbín was born on 17 April 1955 in Callao into an impoverished and dysfunctional family, with little expression of affection and emotions. His mother, Amelia Balbín, had married his father, Ángel Díaz, a merchant seaman who abandoned them when the boy was young. Little is known about Díaz Balbín's early life; he was known as a reserved, extremely private man who barely talked with others. Described later as a psychopath, Díaz Balbín committed his first known murders in November 1976.

On 17 November 1976, Díaz Balbín went unannounced to his aunt's home in Breña, a district of Lima, where she lived with her two children. His aunt, 35-year-old Genoveva Díaz, had helped in Díaz Balbín's upbringing and showed a deep affection for him. He stayed for dinner with her and her children, and he had brought along a briefcase with a knife inside.

After dinner, Genoveva allowed Díaz Balbín to stay for the night due to the curfew imposed under de facto ruler Francisco Morales Bermúdez. She took the children to bed and went to sleep. In the middle of the night, Díaz Balbín went to his aunt's room and stabbed her to death, then did the same to the two children.

Some neighbors called police after hearing strange noises in the night. The Peruvian Investigative Police (PIP) arrived soon after, as some of the neighbors had checked on Genoveva Díaz and her children, finding them dead. When PIP agents combed the house and area, they found and arrested Díaz Balbín wearing bloodstained clothes. He was subsequently taken to a Lima police station pending charges.

== Incarceration, release, and alleged serial murders ==
Díaz Balbín was charged with the killings of his aunt Genoveva Díaz and her two children. Psychiatrists who evaluated him in 1976 found him to be perverse and psychopathic, with strong traits of emotional flatness and lack of empathy. Díaz Balbín was found guilty and sentenced to 15 years in prison for the murders. He was incarcerated at the maximum security prison of San Juan de Lurigancho, where he became a model prisoner, for which he was considered eligible for parole by the early-to-mid 1980s.

After serving nine years of his 15-year prison term, Díaz Balbín was released from the Lurigancho prison in 1985 under a supervised release program. Beginning in December 1985 and spanning weeks into January 1986, the dismembered remains of numerous women, especially sex workers, were found in garbage dumping sites and inside trash bags in avenues of the Lima metropolitan area. The first victim was 26-year-old Mirtha García Flores, who was involved in street prostitution. Witnesses described seeing her on Avenida Arequipa with a man matching the descriptions of Díaz Balbín.

Initially, authorities attributed the killings to a medical student or a butcher due to the precision with which the bodies were dismembered. By January 1986, a psychologist at the National Penitentiary Institute (INPE) was asked to profile the serial killer active in Lima. The psychologist, Alfonso Díaz Vela, kept files about the recently released prisoners whom he considered to represent a danger to society after being freed; among those in the files was Ángel Díaz Balbín. On 6 February 1986, he was arrested in Lima and accused of committing multiple murders in the Lima metropolitan area.

== Death ==
After Díaz Balbín was arrested in February 1986, the INPE hired psychologist Mario Poggi to work on a profile of Díaz Balbín for purposes related to court proceedings and attempt to extract a confession from him. Beginning on the same day of his arrest, Díaz Balbín showed no cooperation with Poggi during the interviews they had at a Lima police station, remaining silent when confronted by Poggi. The hours-long attempts to get information from Díaz Balbín ultimately proved ineffective for Poggi.

On 9 February 1986, during another scheduled interrogation, Poggi asked to be left alone with Díaz Balbín in the interrogation room. Once alone, Poggi ordered Díaz Balbín to undress, and he got naked too. According to reports, Poggi wanted to provoke Díaz Balbín in order to prove that he was a sexual deviant. When this failed to achieve any reaction or cooperation from Díaz Balbín, Poggi deceived him into trying a physical position to demonstrate a point Poggi wanted to make. Poggi knelt on Díaz Balbín's back and strangled him to death using a belt. While strangling him, Poggi mocked and insulted Díaz Balbín, telling him that he would never hurt anyone anymore because he [Poggi] was going to kill him.

Poggi was arrested in that moment, admitting to the killing and saying that he had "saved humankind by finishing off a monster". He was charged with Díaz Balbín's murder and was sentenced to 12 years in prison in a trial at the Supreme Court of Justice. Poggi served five years of his sentence; he was released in 1991 following an amendment to procedural legal codes, and was then required to report to the police station monthly until 1998.

== Suspected victims and aftermath ==
Among the suspected victims of Díaz Balbín was an Italian woman named Nina Barzotti, though his guilt was never established in this case nor in any of those that occurred in the Lima area between 1985 and 1986. In fact, some investigators later noted that some dismemberment murders kept taking place in Lima even after Díaz Balbín's arrest. Díaz Balbín was suspected of having murdered more than 20 women in the Lima serial murders.

Although it was reported that Poggi used techniques from the SS like depriving Díaz Balbín of food and showing him images of dismembered bodies, Poggi always denied those accusations, only admitting to killing Díaz Balbín while telling him that he was a "fucking murderer" and that he "would never kill again".

== Confirmed victims ==
#	Name	Age	Date of murder	Notes
1	Genoveva Juana Díaz de Zúñiga (Note: The newspaper La República identifies Díaz as "Juana" only, while other sources like Infobae as only Genoveva.)	35	17 November 1976	Díaz Balbín's aunt
2	Leonel Zúñiga Díaz	?	17 November 1976	Díaz Balbín's cousin, a child
3	Pastor Zúñiga Díaz	?	17 November 1976	Díaz Balbín's cousin, a child
