= Luis Giampietri =

Peruvian politician (1940–2023)

Luis Giampietri OSP
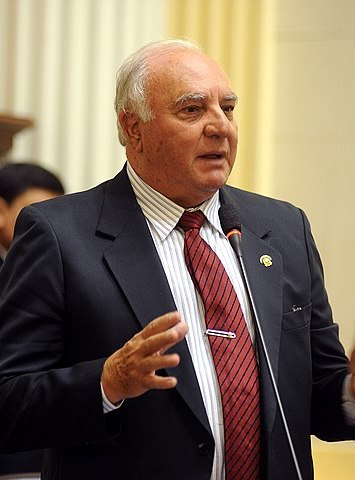
- Giampietri in 2011

First Vice President of Peru
- In office 28 July 2006 – 28 July 2011
- President: Alan García
- Preceded by: Raúl Diez Canseco
- Succeeded by: Marisol Espinoza

Member of Congress
- In office 26 July 2006 – 26 July 2011
- Constituency: Callao

Lima City Councilman
- In office 1 January 1999 – 31 December 2002

Personal details
- Born: Luis Alejandro Giampietri Rojas; 31 December 1940 Callao, Peru
- Died: 4 October 2023 (aged 82) Lima, Peru
- Party: Independent
- Other political affiliations: Peruvian Aprista Party (2006‍–‍2011); Vamos Vecino (1998)
- Spouse: Lidia Marcela Ramos Seminario
- Children: 4
- Education: Peruvian Naval School

Military service
- Allegiance: Peru
- Branch: Peruvian Navy
- Service years: 1960–1996
- Rank: Admiral

Luis Alejandro Giampietri Rojas (31 December 1940 – 4 October 2023) was a Peruvian politician belonging to the Peruvian Aprista Party and an admiral of the Peruvian Navy. Giampietri ran successfully as Alan García's first running mate in the 2006 general election. He was sworn in on 28 July 2006 and served until 28 July 2011. He was also elected as Congressman representing the Constitutional Province of Callao for the 2006–2011 term. He lost his seat in the 2011 elections when he ran for re-election under the Radical Change party, but he received a minority of votes, and the Radical Change failed to pass the electoral threshold and subsequently lost its registration the following year. Before he served as Vice President and Congressman, Giampietri was a Lima City Councilman from 1999 to 2002, elected under the Fujimorist Vamos Vecino, close to then-President Alberto Fujimori.

Giampietri was one of the naval officers implicated in the massacre on El Frontón, a prison island off the coast of Callao. The massacre took place during Alan García's administration, on 18 June 1986, after Shining Path prisoners staged an uprising at El Frontón and two other prisons. All the prisoners involved in the rebellion were killed, and Human Rights Watch claimed that evidence suggested that "no fewer than ninety" of the prisoners killed were victims of extrajudicial executions.

== Biography ==
Luis Giampietri was born in the Bellavista neighborhood of the Callao region, the son of Luis Giampietri Berenice and Rosa Rojas Lapoint. He attended the Colegio de la Inmaculada and the San José Maristas schools in Lima and Callao, respectively.

Giampietri entered the Naval School of Peru, from where he graduated with a Bachelor of Naval Sciences in 1960. Later, he graduated as a Navy Diver, and later specialized in Demolition and Special Operations. In 1968, he followed the Basic General Staff Course, and in 1974, he graduated from the Advanced General Staff course at the Higher School of Naval Warfare; in 1983, he took the High Command course at the same school.

== Navy career ==
In 1987, during the government of Alan García, he was appointed Commander of the Center Special Operations Group. As a full member of the Navy, he reached the rank of Vice Admiral, reaching the position of Chief of the General Staff of the Navy in the Second Government of Alberto Fujimori.

Giampietri founded the Navy Special Operations Force.

== 1996 Japanese embassy hostage crisis ==
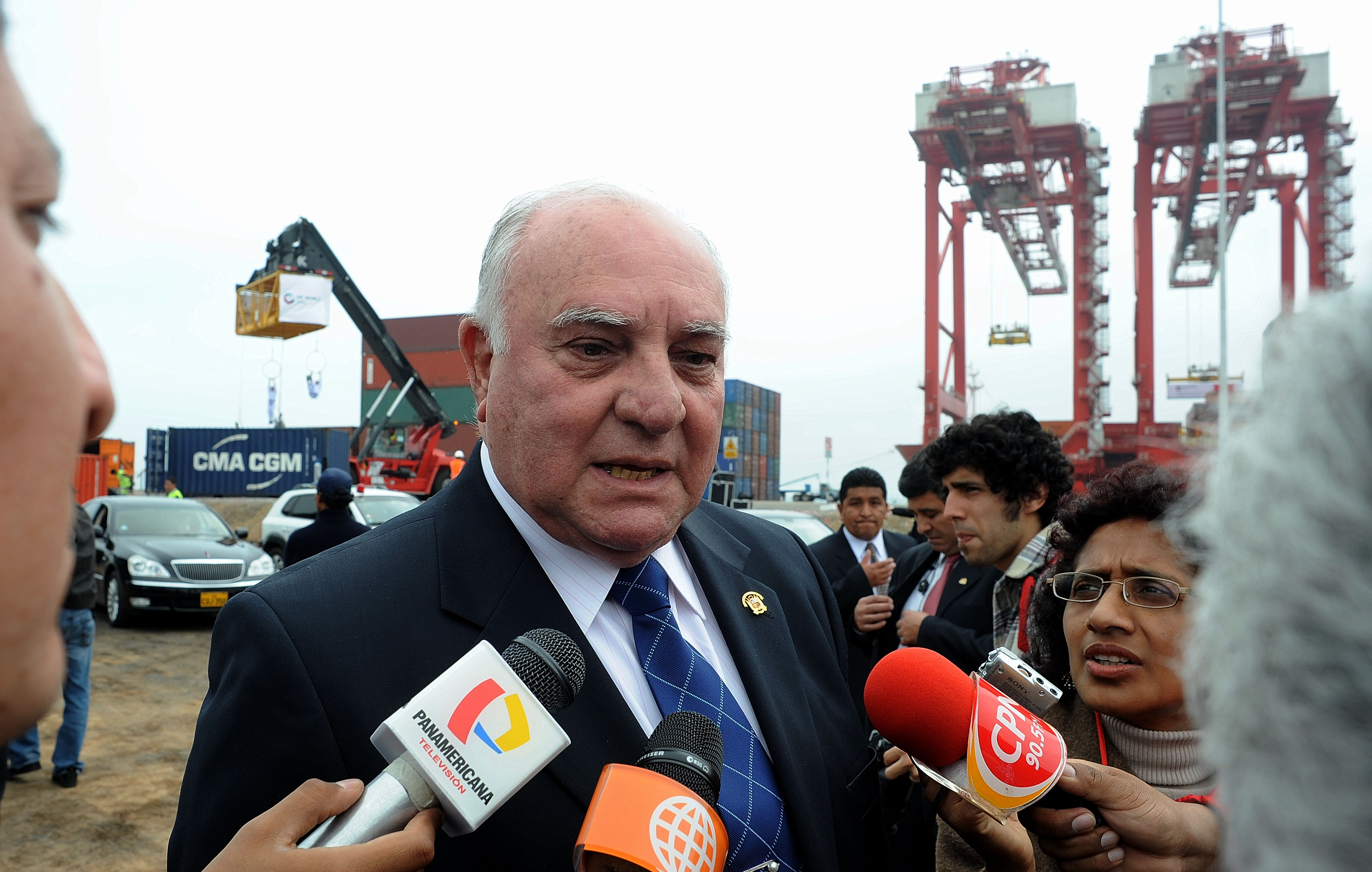
Luis Giampietri

On 17 December 1996, Giampietri was taken hostage by the Túpac Amaru Revolutionary Movement (MRTA) during the Japanese embassy hostage crisis. Key to the success of the rescue operation was the intelligence provided by Giampietri, admiral of the Peruvian Navy at the time and former commander of a special operations group. He received and distributed hundreds of bugged items in the building and communicated by radio with the Peruvian military.

== Political career ==
In the general elections of Peru in 2006, after the triumph of Alan García in those elections, Giampietri was elected 1st Vice President of the Republic. On 28 July of the same year, he was sworn in before the Congress of the Republic for the period 2006–2011 together with Lourdes Mendoza del Solar, who was the 2nd Vice President.

In these elections, Giampietri also ran for Congress and was elected Congressman by APRA for the 2006–2011 period, in his parliamentary term, he was President of the Intelligence Commission (2006–2007) and a member of the Defense and Production Commissions.

== Death ==
Giampietri died in Lima on 4 October 2023, at the age of 82.

== Controversies ==
Giampietri was one of the naval officers implicated in the massacre on El Frontón, a prison island off the coast of Callao. The massacre took place during Alan García's administration, on 18 June 1986, after Shining Path prisoners staged an uprising at El Frontón and two other prisons. All the prisoners involved in the rebellion were killed, and Human Rights Watch claimed that evidence suggested that "no fewer than ninety" of the prisoners killed were victims of extrajudicial executions.

In addition to the above, his links with the Fujimori regime were criticized (he was a councillor for Vamos Vecino in 1995), complaints of corruption and his criticism of the Truth Commission.

== Honours ==
- Japan:
  - Grand Cordon of the Order of the Rising Sun (2011)
