= Mario Poggi =

Peruvian psychologist and murderer (1943–2016)

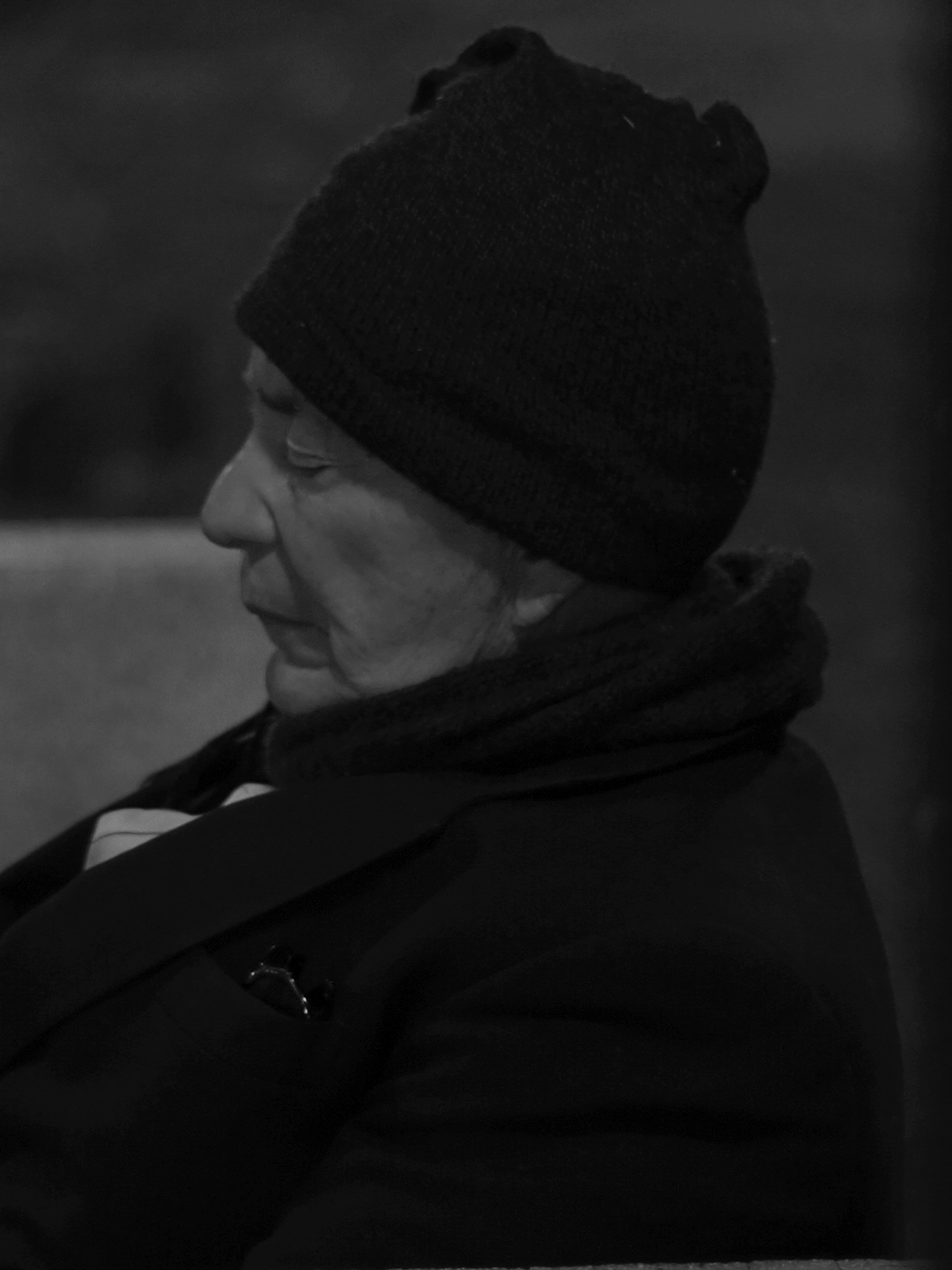
- Poggi in 2015
- Born: Mario Augusto Poggi Estremadoyro; March 3, 1943; Barranco, Lima, Perú
- Died: February 26, 2016 (aged 72); Lima, Perú
- Occupations: Psychologist, sculptor, humorist
- Website: Mario Poggi Estremadoyro

Mario Augusto Poggi Estremadoyro (March 3, 1943 – February 26, 2016) was a Peruvian psychologist, artist, sculptor and humorist. He became well known for killing alleged serial killer Ángel Díaz Balbín in 1986; he was arrested for the murder and sentenced to seven years in prison, but was released in 1991 after serving around five years.

== Biography ==
=== Early life ===
Poggi studied criminology at the University of Leuven in Belgium.

=== Crime ===
From December 1985 to February 1986, dismembered human body parts, mainly female, were discovered in black bags in trashcans and alleyways around Lima, Peru. The remains were thought to belong to at least seven different victims, and potentially up to twenty. The Peruvian National Police ("Policía de Investigaciones del Perú," PIP) suspected 30-year-old Ángel Díaz Balbín (some sources reported Hugo Díaz Balbín) of the crime. A decade earlier in 1976, Díaz Balbín had been convicted of killing his aunt and two of his cousins, and was also suspected of killing another woman. Díaz Balbín had gotten out of prison shortly before the body parts began showing up.

In early February 1986, police arrested Díaz Balbín on suspicion of his involvement, but could not get him to confess. Frustrated, they requested help from Poggi, who had been working as a psychologist in Europe and had previously worked for the PIP as a professor at the Center of Instruction ("El Centro de Instrucción), also called the Officer School ("Escuela De Oficiales").

Poggi interrogated Díaz Balbín for four days but was unable to elicit a confession. According to some sources, the police had asked Poggi to get a confession by using the "scientific methods" of the Nazis in the Second World War (i.e., torture), but he still would not confess. On February 7 (the fourth day of interrogations), Poggi met with journalists from the Caretas newsmagazine (either two people or just Jorge Salazar) and offered an exclusive scoop on Díaz Balbín, as well as tapes from the interrogations, in return for payment. (However, one source says Poggi met with them "hours before committing the crime.") Poggi received a check for half the agreed upon amount.

The following day, on February 9, 1986, Poggi threw Díaz Balbín to the ground and tightened a belt around his neck until he suffocated. Strangely, body parts kept showing up even after Díaz Balbín's death. (Although one source claims there weren't any murders after.) Poggi was subsequently found guilty and sentenced to seven years in prison. He was released after five years in 1991.

Poggi's motive for the crime is unclear. Many sources state that Poggi decided to kill Díaz Balbín because he feared there was not enough evidence to prove Díaz Balbín was the serial killer as the key witness who claimed to have seen Díaz Balbín placing body parts in a trash bin decided not to testify. Believing Díaz Balbín was the dangerous serial killer, Poggi killed him to prevent him from going free. On the other hand, the Peruvian journalist Enrique Sol alleged that Poggi told him during an interview that he killed Díaz Balbín to prevent his publicizing the illegal torture methods Poggi had used. In another interview, Poggi allegedly claimed the police, frustrated at not getting a confession, had killed Díaz Balbín and manipulated the autopsy to make it look like he was strangled. In this account, Poggi then agreed to take the blame for the crime after being told he would only spend four months in jail and that prison would allow him to study the psychology of the other prisoners.

According to one source, during the final interrogation, Poggi disrobed himself and attempted to sexually provoke Díaz Balbín (who was tied up) into confessing and showing Poggi how he raped his victims before killing them. However, Díaz Balbín still did not confess.

=== Celebrity ===
After leaving prison in 1991, Poggi tried to start anew by hiding in the rain-forests of Ucayali. However, due to the news coverage of the murder, he was a minor celebrity and was repeatedly invited on numerous Peruvian talk shows, where he became a regular guest. He also dyed his hair green and referred to himself as "The Crazy One" ("El Loco"). Poggi also starred in the low-budget movie "My Naked Crime" ("Mi crimen al desnudo"), originally titled "Poggi: Angel or Demon." Directed by Leónidas Zegarra, the film chronicled an erotic version of Díaz Balbín's murder and was shown in local theaters until 2001.

In 2006, Poggi unsuccessfully ran for president of Peru.

In his final years, he frequented Kennedy Park in Miraflores, where he sold books and gave psychology tests to passersby.

=== Death ===
Poggi died of a heart attack February 26, 2016, aged 73, following his hospitalization the previous day for a prior heart attack.

== Books ==
- 1970: Mi Primer Pajazo. (My First Handjob)
- 1975: Yo solo sé que soy un imbécil (Only I Know I'm a Moron) Autobiographic Text. Lima (Perú): Editorial El Siglo (The Century Publisher), 1997.
- Años 1990: El decálogo de la correa vengadora (The '90s: The Decade of the Avenger Belt) Text on which he refers to the belt which he used in Balbín's killing.

== Film ==
- 2001: Mi crimen al desnudo (My Nude Crime). Directed by Leónidas Zegarra.
