= Marisol Espinoza =

Peruvian politician (born 1967)

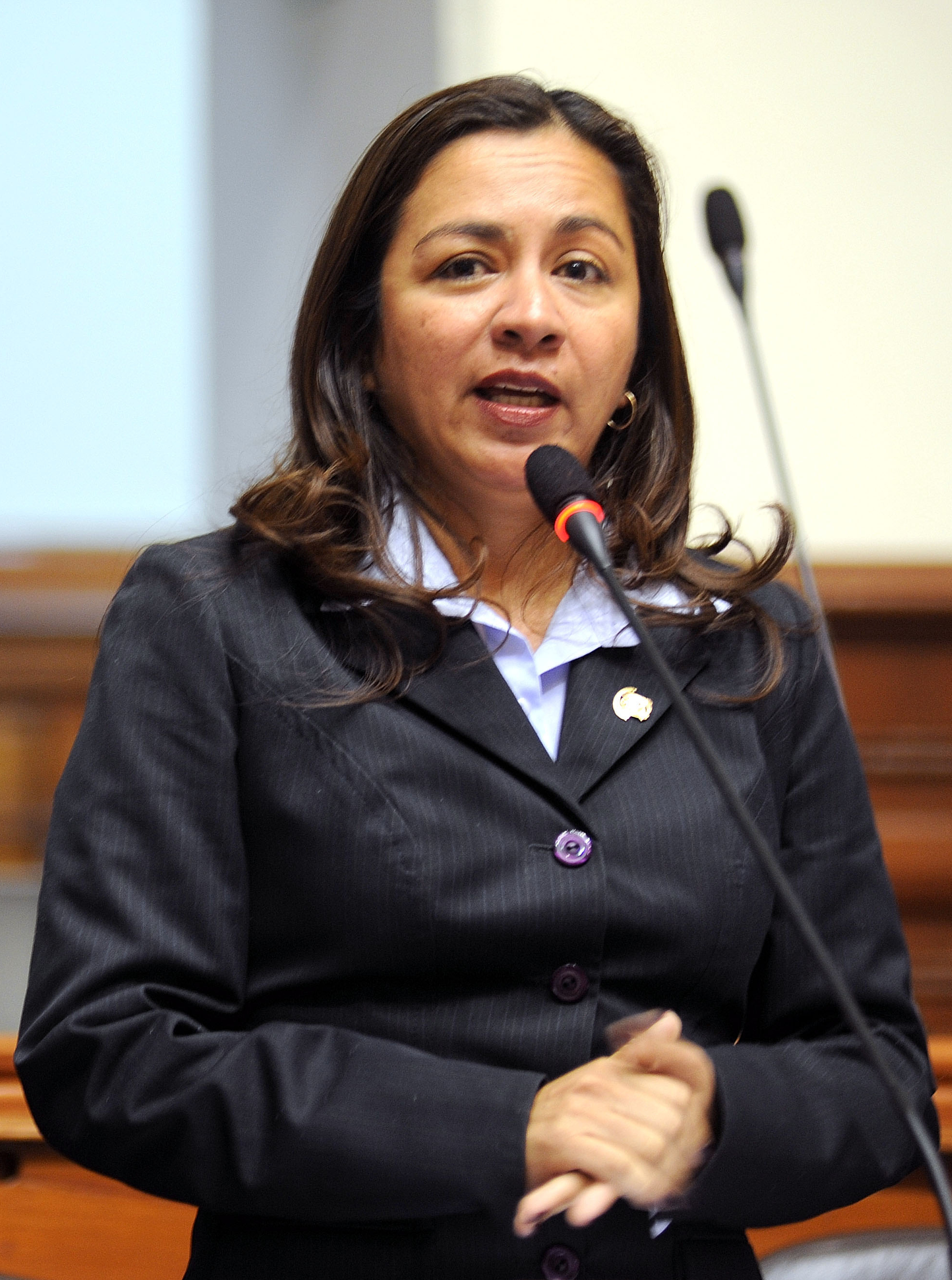
- Espinoza in 2010

First Vice President of Peru
- In office 28 July 2011 – 28 July 2016
- President: Ollanta Humala
- Preceded by: Luis Giampietri
- Succeeded by: Martín Vizcarra

Member of Congress
- In office 26 July 2006 – 30 September 2019
- Constituency: Piura

Personal details
- Born: 30 July 1967 (age 59) Piura, Peru
- Party: Alliance for Progress (since 2015)
- Other political affiliations: Peruvian Nationalist Party (until 2015); Union for Peru (2006)
- Education: University of Piura
- Profession: Journalist

Marisol Espinoza Cruz (Spanish pronunciation: [maɾiˌsol espiˌnosa ˈkɾus]; born 30 July 1967) is a Peruvian politician who was the First Vice President of Peru during the Humala administration from 2011–2016. She has been a Congresswoman representing Piura between 2006 and 2019. Espinoza belongs to the Peruvian Nationalist Party.

== Early life and education ==
Marisol Espinoza was born in Piura where she attended San José de Tarbes school in her hometown. From 1985 to 1991 she studied information science and liberal arts, with a focus on journalism, at the University of Piura. From 1988 to 1989 she was trainee editor for the local daily La Industria. In 1991 she worked as a drafter and reporter for RBC Channel 11. From 1991 to 1992 she edited international news for América Televisión. In December 1992 she left her then position at América Televisión to become head of the Economics page of the newspaper El Tiempo of Piura, in 2002. Espinoza took part in postgraduate programs of Florida International University and Northwestern University. From 1999 to 2000 she returned to her alma mater to study for a master's degree in economics.

== Political career ==
In January 2005 Marisol Espinoza joined the Union for Peru party. She was elected Congresswoman representing Piura in the 2006 legislative election. Since July 2009 she has been speaker of the Nationalist bench in the Congress. In the 2011 presidential election Espinoza was Ollanta Humala's running mate as candidate for First Vice President of Peru on the Peru Wins ticket. On June 5 Humala was elected president, and Espinoza first vice president, with 51.5% of the votes, and took office on 28 July 2011.

Espinoza quit the Nationalist Party in September 2015 and left the Peru Wins benches in Congress a month later. In the 2016 Congressional election she ran as an independent under the Alliance for the Progress of Peru slate.
