= Santa Mónica Prison =

Prison building in Lima, Peru

Coordinates: 12°10′24″S 77°01′09″W

- Penal Santa Mónica
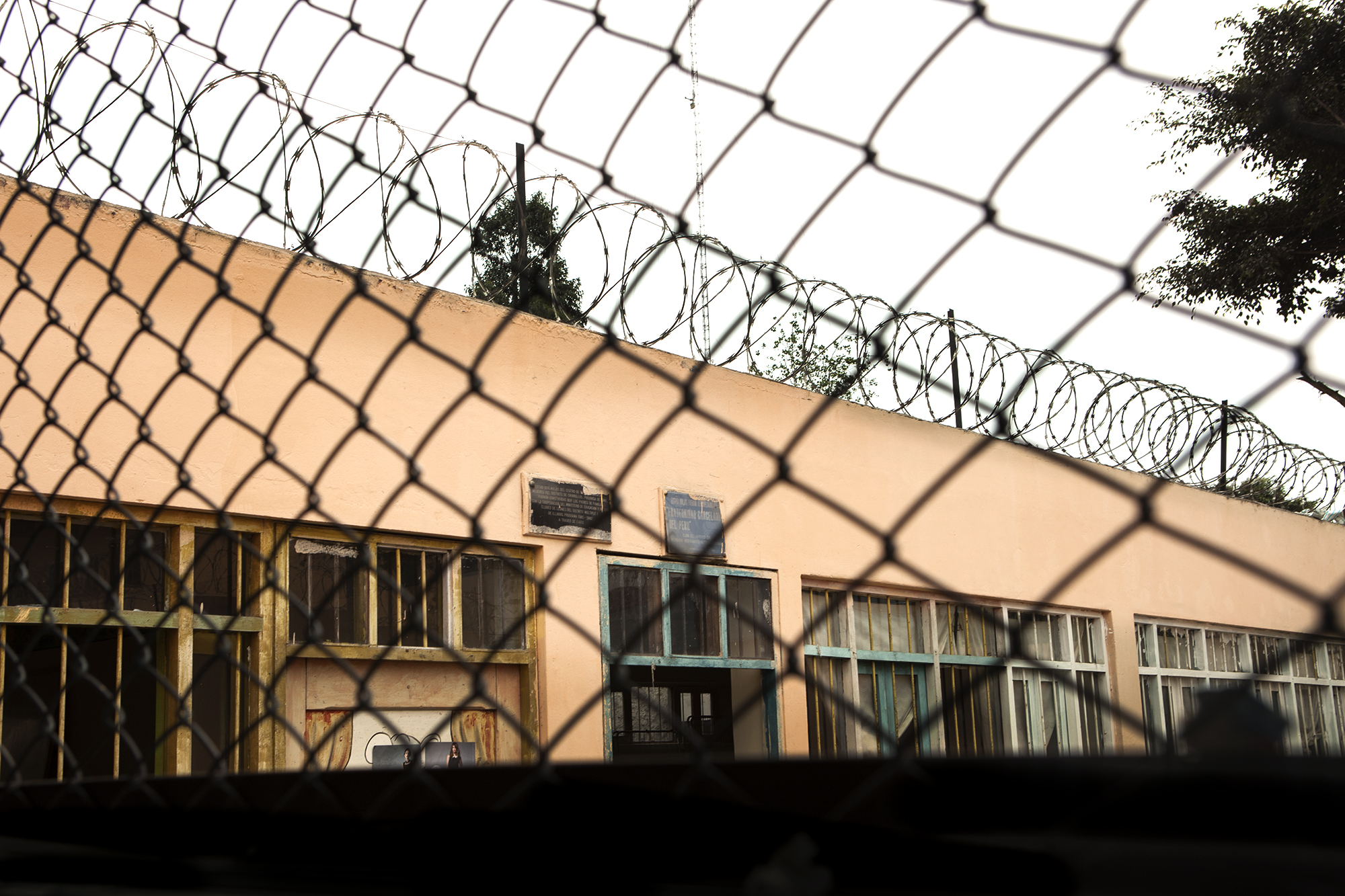
- Interactive map of the Santa Mónica Prison area

General information
- Location: Chorrillos, Lima, Peru
- Inaugurated: 5 April 1992
- Owner: National Penitentiary Institute

The Chorrillos Women's Penitentiary Annex (Spanish: Establecimiento Penitenciario Anexo Mujeres de Chorrillos), formerly known as Santa Mónica Prison (Spanish: Penal Santa Mónica), is a high-security women's prison in Chorrillos, Lima, Peru.

== History ==
The building started operating on April 5, 1992, receiving female inmates from Cantogrande Prison that had been imprisoned on terrorism charges during the armed conflict. At the time of its opening, it was operated by the National Police.

In 1997, the prison was intervened by the National Penitentiary Institute (INPE) through Supreme Decree No. 005-96, which also reorganised the inmates' classification. A resolution published on July 17, 2006, transferred control of the prison to INPE.

Despite the prison's capacity for 450 inmates, it suffered from overcrowding. It had a total of 1038 inmates in 2012, of which 175 were moved to Virgen de Fátima Prison on March 9 to prevent overcrowding.

== Notable inmates ==
- Keiko Fujimori, presidential candidate in the 2011 and 2016 elections
- Nadine Heredia, First Lady of Peru from 2011 to 2016
- Susana Villarán, former mayor of Lima
- Betssy Chávez, former Prime Minister of Peru
- Yenifer Paredes, sister-in-law of former president Pedro Castillo
- Magaly Medina, TV presenter
- Blanca Nélida Colán, Attorney General of Peru
- Ingrid Schwend, daughter of SS member Friedrich Schwend who was convicted for the murder of a Spaniard

== See also ==
- National Penitentiary Institute (Peru)
- San Jorge Prison
