= Canto Grande massacre =

- Part of the Peruvian Internal Conflict
- Location: Canto Grande Prison
- Objective: Transfer female prisoners to a women's prisons. Retake control of the Canto Grande prison from the Luminosas Trincheras de Combate.
- Date: May 6–9, 1992
- Executed by: Group Colina; Peruvian Army; Peruvian Police; National Intelligence Service
- Outcome: Control of the Canto Grande prison.; Dismantling of the Luminosas Trincheras de Combate (LTC).; Successful transfer of female prisoners
- Casualties: 42 prisoners, including 13 members of the Shining Path leadership. killed

Canto Grande massacre
- Location: During the attack
- Date: 6-9th of May 1992
- Target: Prisoners; Imprisoned members of the Shining Path Central Committee.
- Attack type: Killing of surrendering prisoners; Denial of medical care; Disproportionate use of force; Elimination of 13 members of the Shining Path Central Committee.
- Inquiry: Truth and Reconciliation Commission (Peru)

The Canto Grande massacre or Miguel Castro Castro prison massacre, known militarily as Operation Mudanza 1, was an operation carried out in May 1992 by the Peruvian government forces.

== Events ==
A dispute between prisoners of the shining path group and government forces arose due to the request to transfer female prisoners away from the facility to Chorrillos Prison.

Government forces stormed the prison on the 6th of May 1992, with the final assault taking place on the 9th. 42 Shining Path members would be killed, with the Truth and reconciliation commission hearing evidence that insufficient medical care was provided and that some were shot while attempting to surrender, including senior commanders of Shining Path.

The female prisoners were transferred and President Fujimori would tour the prison on May 10th.

== See also ==
- Internal Conflict in Peru
- Arrest and trial of Alberto Fujimori
