= El Sexto Prison =

Former prison in Peru

- The prison during the mutiny
- Interactive map of El Sexto Prison
- Location: Lima District, Peru
- Status: Closed (prison)
- Security class: Medium security
- Capacity: 300 (1981)
- Opened: 1904
- Closed: March 8, 1986
- Managed by: Republican Guard

El Sexto Prison (Spanish: Penal El Sexto), previously El Sexto Barracks (Spanish: Cuartel El Sexto), was a prison located in Lima District, Peru. Located next to the College of Our Lady of Guadalupe in the 13th block of Alfonso Ugarte Avenue, it took its name from the fact that the sixth station of the Republican Guard was located there. It is best known for the violent riot that took place for fourteen hours on March 27, 1984, which left 22 dead and 10 wounded.

It is currently known as Alfonso Ugarte Police Station (Spanish: Comisaría PNP Alfonso Ugarte) and is operated by the National Police of Peru, no longer serving as a prison since its closure by Alan García in 1986.

== History ==
The prison was built in 1904, serving as the destination for political prisoners, such as José María Arguedas, during the early 20th century. Arguedas' experience inspired his novel of the same name, published in 1961. Three years before the riot, a violent incident took place between gangs from Lima proper and Callao, leaving 31 people dead, among them 29 suffocated and asphyxiated.

=== Escape attempts ===
A number of escape attempts took place at the prison, starting with a failed attempt made by fifteen inmates in 1964 using bedsheets and wooden boards.

A notable incident took place on July 28, 1968, when twelve armed inmates escaped to the cry of "We are free!" (Spanish: ¡Somos libres!) through the gate at what was then called Jirón Bolivia, heading towards the Plaza Bolognesi, and continuing southbound through Brazil Avenue until they reached Bolívar Avenue. Five Republican Guards and one civilian employee were injured during the escape, which took place parallel to a speech being given by President Fernando Belaúnde at the Legislative Palace announcing that the Peruvian State would begin to directly exploit the deposits of La Brea y Pariñas. Of the escapees, three (Alejandro García Rodríguez, Eusebio Araníbar and Victor Bravo Elías) died due to torture, while one (Victor Torres Murray) was identified as belonging to a notorious criminal gang ran by Guillermo "La Gringa" Portugal Delgado, best known for his escape attempts from El Frontón, known as the "Banda de la metralleta" after the submachine gun stolen by Portugal. The gang had been responsible for a series of violent crimes in the years prior to the escape attempt that had left two people dead and many more injured, most notably in the robberies of a petrol station in Chancay and a pharmacy in Lima. After the escape, similar crimes immediately continued, aimed at bank agencies, jewelry shops and other businesses in general, with the Peruvian Investigative Police (PIP) carrying out a conference headed by Director-General Hércules Marthans Garro with over 300 business owners in order to address the issue. All inmates were eventually recaptured through investigations made by the PIP in an interval that lasted from days to months.

Another escape attempt took place on Sunday, January 3, 1971, where three out of eleven inmates were immediately recaptured after being shot by law enforcement guarding the prison.

=== Mutiny ===
El Sexto Prison mutiny
- Native name: Motín del penal El Sexto
- Date: March 27–28, 1984
- Location: El Sexto Prison
- Type: Prison riot
- Perpetrator: 12 inmates
- Outcome: Mutiny suppressed
- Casualties: 22 dead, 40 injured; numerous arrests made

Around 10 a.m. on March 27, 1984, inmate Víctor "Carioco" Ayala stabbed an employee carrying food, starting a revolt. Fellow inmates Luis "Pilatos" García Mendoza and Eduardo "Lalo" Centenaro Fernández, alongside ten other inmates, took over the prison with pistols, knives and dynamite, taking eleven civilians and three other inmates as hostages. The events were shown on national television, with news stations Panamericana (Channel 5) and América (Channel 4) broadcasting from 11:15 a.m.

On two separate occasions, two of the hostages were injured after being sent to the prison's rooftop in order to be seen by the broadcasters: one was sprayed with kerosene at 1:53 p.m. and another one shot in the abdomen at 2:56 p.m. The former died of his injuries on April 2, while the latter was successfully treated.

Then president Fernando Belaúnde ordered that negotiations begin, while the Republican Guard was to surround the prison in order to keep the peace. Prosecutor Leoncio Delgado Briones received the list of demands from the hostages, which included their escape. The Republican Guard's Yapan Atic Battalion (Quecha for "those who can do anything") arrived later at the scene, with the prison now surrounded on the streets and the rooftops.

At 9:50 p.m., the Republican Guard announced that a police van would be delivered as per the prisoners' request. Unbeknownst to the prisoners, the van was occupied by law enforcement special forces, who opened fire once the light had been cut off. One hostage, a prisoner, was executed by the hostage takers, and another one was shot in the jaw but survived. By 12:30 a.m. on March 28, the mutiny had ended. Twenty-two people (including two hostages) had been killed, while ten people were injured.

=== Later history ===
On March 8, 1986, two years after the mutiny, then president Alan García formally closed the prison in a ceremony where he was accompanied by his father, a former inmate of the prison. It is currently a police station for the National Police of Peru named after the avenue it's located at.

== In popular culture ==
The events of the 1984 mutiny inspired the film Report on Death, released in 1993.

== Notable inmates ==
- Edmundo Haya de la Torre, brother of Víctor Raúl Haya de la Torre
- José María Arguedas, imprisoned from 1937 to 1938.
- Carlos García Ronceros, APRA Party member and father of Alan García

== See also ==
- Lima Penitentiary
- San Jorge Prison
