= Lima Bay =

Bay in Peru

Coordinates: 12°08′S 77°06′W

- Miraflores Bay
- Spanish: Bahía de Lima
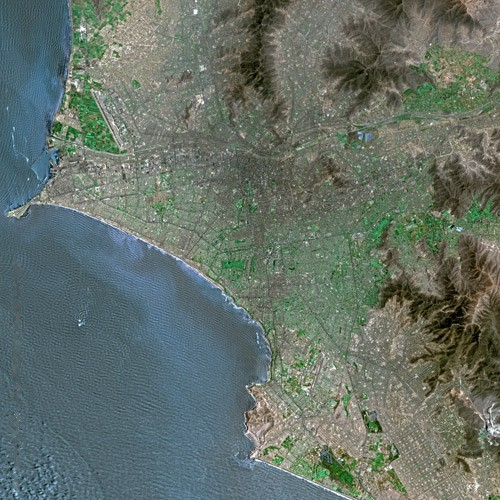
- Interactive map of Lima Bay
- Location: Peru
- Ocean/sea sources: Pacific Ocean
- Settlements: Callao, Lima

Lima Bay (Spanish: Bahía de Lima), also known as Miraflores Bay (Spanish: Bahía de Miraflores), is a bay located of the coast of Lima, Peru. Its shore is located on the central coast of the Lima Province and the southern end of Callao, both part of the metropolitan area of Lima. Administratively it belongs to both Lima and Callao.

== Overview ==
The bay is separated from Callao Bay by the Peninsula of La Punta. Due to its location, it is a place of great commercial, tourist and military importance, there is the Costa Verde Beach Circuit, which unites the coastal districts of the bay, which are La Punta and La Perla in Callao, San Miguel, Magdalena del Mar, San Isidro, Miraflores, Barranco and Chorrillos, in Lima.

The shore area is characterized by being rocky and full of cliffs. The Peruvian government has two mega constructions planned in the bay: the Miraflores Bay Cruise Terminal for tourists in the Miraflores district, and the Gran Bahía de Lima viewpoint in honour of Miguel Grau in the Chorrillos district.

== See also ==
- Malecón de Miraflores
