= Lurigancho Prison =

Prison building in Lima, Peru

Coordinates: 11.992°S 76.997°W

- Penal de Lurigancho
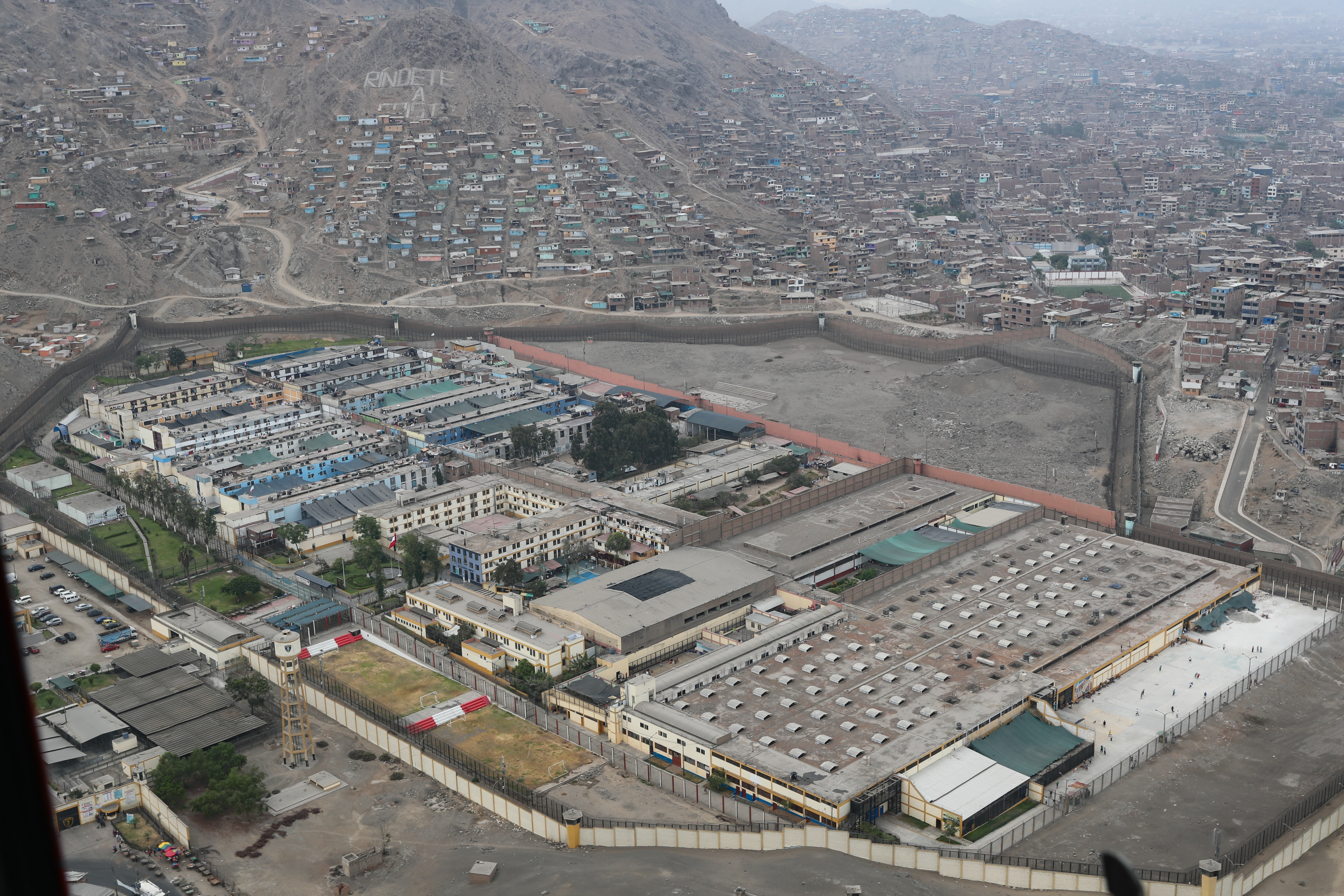
- Former names: Social Readaptation Centre; San Juan Prison

General information
- Location: San Juan de Lurigancho
- Inaugurated: December 14, 1974
- Owner: National Penitentiary Institute

Lurigancho Penitentiary Establishment (Spanish: Establecimiento Penitenciario Lurigancho) is a medium-security prison in San Juan de Lurigancho, a district of Lima, Peru. Located at the district's El Sol Avenue, its occupies a space of 25,867.43 square kilometres (9,987.47 sq mi), of which 18,686 square kilometres (7,215 sq mi) belong to the building complex with a total capacity of 2,500 inmates.

== History ==
The prison was inaugurated on December 14, 1974, and began operating under the name of "Social Readaptation Centre" (Centro de Readaptación Social; CRAS). It was renamed "San Pedro" in 1992, and given its current name on September 2, 1998. Unlike other penitentiary establishments of its time, it was designed to accommodate workplaces and study areas. During the internal conflict in Peru, the complex saw the imprisonment of Víctor Polay, one of the founders of the Túpac Amaru Revolutionary Movement, and several members of the Shining Path. In 1986, several inmates were massacred by the military. On February 10, 1987, the building was taken over by the Republican Guard, who began the administration of the complex. At the time, the prison's population was numbered at 5,000 people.

As of 2017, it was the most populated in the country, with 9,607 inmates. The building is surrounded by illegal dwellings, who violate a 200-square-metre (2,200 sq ft) vacant perimeter required by law. It has since continued to function as a rehabilitation centre, and faces challenges due to overcrowding.

== See also ==
- Miguel Castro Castro prison
