= San Lorenzo Island (Peru) =

Island in the Constitutional Province of Callao, Peru

San Lorenzo
Native name: Isla San Lorenzo (Spanish)
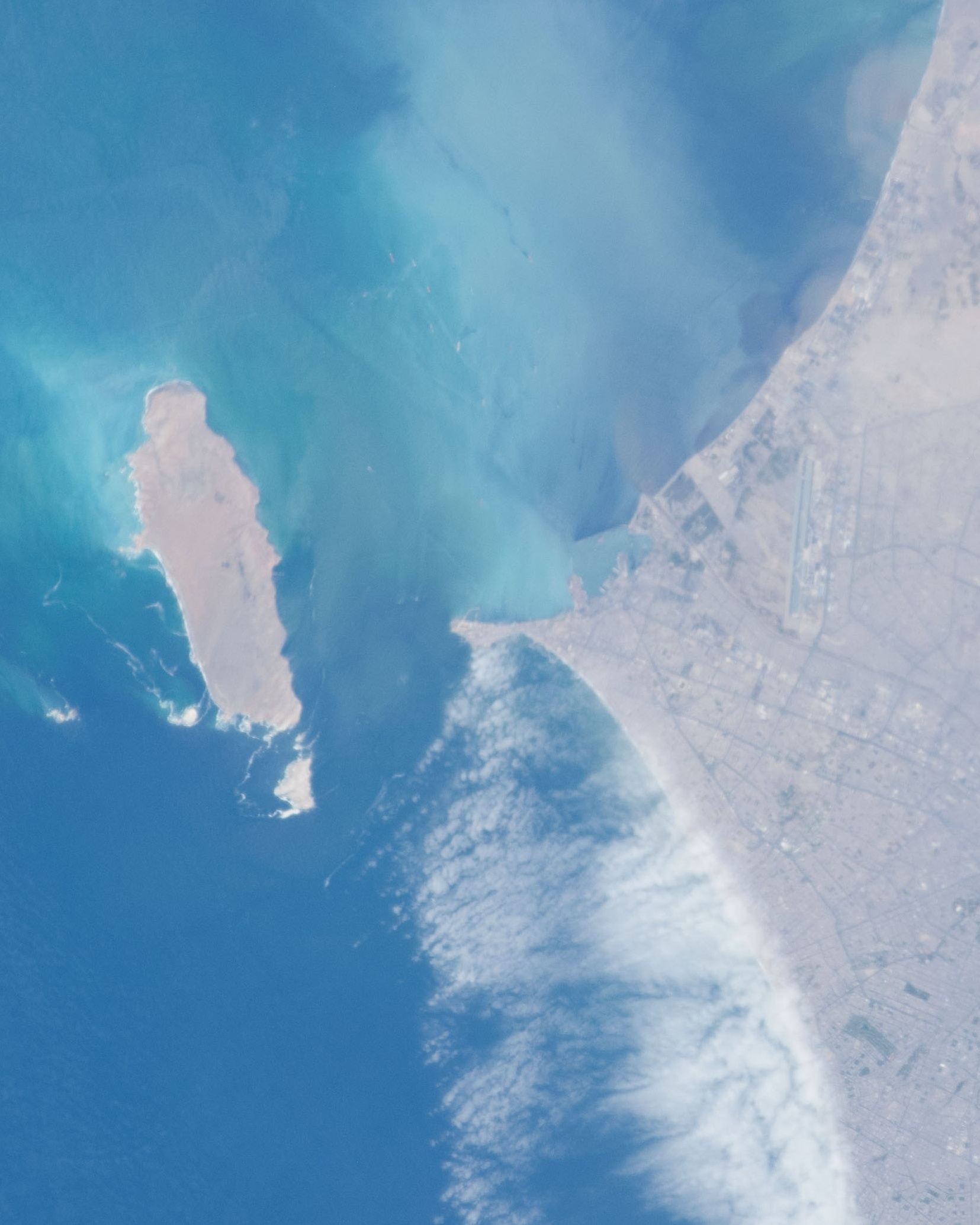
- ISS photograph of Lima Bay, showing San Lorenzo (left) off the coast of Callao (right).

- Location within Peru

Geography
- Location: Pacific Ocean
- Coordinates: 12°05′47″S 77°13′15″W
- Area: 16.48 km^{2} (6.36 sq mi)
- Length: 8 km (5 mi)
- Width: 2.2 km (1.37 mi)
- Highest elevation: 396 m (1299 ft)
- Highest point: Cerro La Mina

Administration
- Peru
- Constitutional Province: Callao
- District: La Punta

Demographics
- Population: 0 (Military personnel only)

San Lorenzo is an island located in the Pacific Ocean off the coast of Callao, Peru. With an area of 16.48 square kilometres (6.36 sq mi), it is the largest island in the country. The island lacks natural sources of fresh water and remains uninhabited, although it currently houses a naval base of the Peruvian Navy.

It was officially incorporated into the territory of the Constitutional Province of Callao by a law enacted on 18 November 1899, during the administration of President Andrés Avelino Cáceres. The island is separated from the mainland by a channel known as "El Boquerón" and is located near El Frontón island and the Palomino Islands, which are known for their sea lion colonies.

== Geography ==
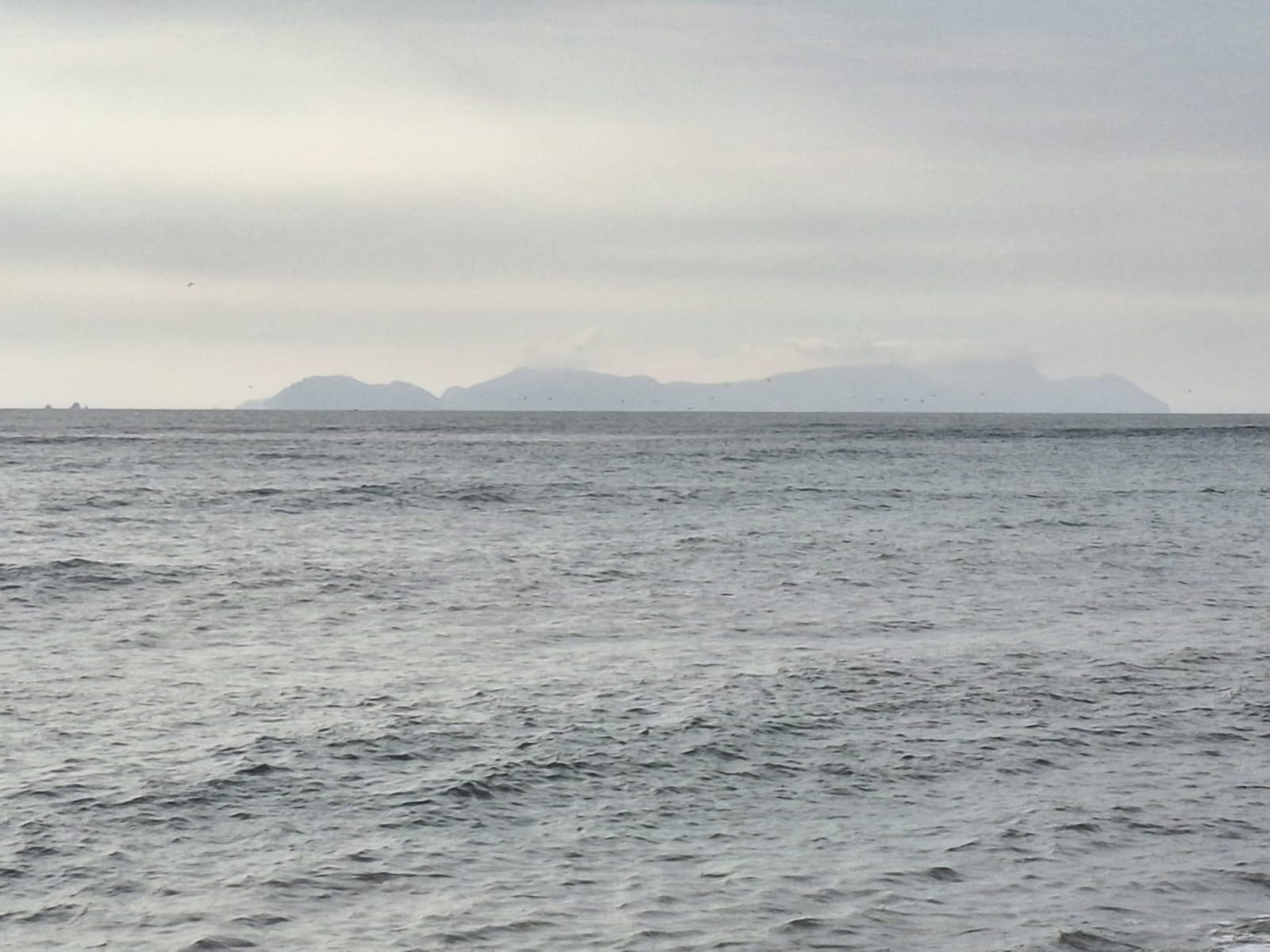
View of San Lorenzo Island from the coast of Barranco, Lima.

San Lorenzo is approximately 8 kilometres (5.0 mi) long and 2.2 kilometres (1.4 mi) wide. Its highest point is Cerro La Mina, reaching an elevation of 396 metres (1,299 ft) above sea level. Due to the absence of fresh water sources, the island has never been urbanized.

== History ==
=== Pre-Columbian era ===
The island was never permanently inhabited due to the lack of water but was frequently visited by inhabitants of ancient Peru, who used it as a cemetery. In the mythology of the central Peruvian coast, offshore islands were often associated with the afterlife. Between 1906 and 1907, German archaeologist Max Uhle conducted the first excavations at the southern tip of the island, discovering metal objects and funerary bundles at the Caleta de la Cruz site, dating to the Late Intermediate Period and Late Horizon (900–1532 AD). In 2010, the National Institute of Culture declared twenty archaeological monuments on the island as Cultural Heritage of the Nation.

=== Colonial period ===
During the Viceroyalty of Peru, stones quarried from San Lorenzo were used for the construction of the Real Felipe Fortress and the Presidio of Callao. The island also served as an occasional base for English and Dutch pirates who raided Callao, such as Francis Drake and Jacques L'Hermite. The latter died of dysentery and was buried on the island along with some of his crew members.

=== Republican era ===
In 1835, English naturalist Charles Darwin explored the island during the voyage of HMS Beagle, observing its geology and nature.

During the Chincha Islands War in 1866, the Spanish Navy retreated to San Lorenzo after the Battle of Callao on 2 May. Spanish forces used the island to repair their ships and bury their dead before withdrawing from the Peruvian coast.

In the early 20th century, proposals were made to connect the island to the mainland. In 1912, President Guillermo Billinghurst proposed building a dike, and studies were conducted by Dutch engineer J. Kraus in 1914 and later by the Danish firm Christian & Nielsen in 1958. The project, which included a new commercial port, was never realized due to financial constraints and environmental concerns regarding the island's fauna.

=== Modern history ===
In the early 1990s, during the internal conflict in Peru, the naval base on the island served as a temporary high-security prison for captured leaders of terrorist organizations Shining Path and Túpac Amaru Revolutionary Movement (MRTA), including Abimael Guzmán and Víctor Polay, while permanent maximum-security prisons were being constructed.

== See also ==
- List of islands of Peru
- Callao
