= Miguel Castro Castro prison =

Prison building in Lima, Peru

Coordinates: 11.9840°S 76.9893°W

Miguel Castro Castro Prison
- Penal Miguel Castro Castro
- Interactive map of the Miguel Castro Castro Prison area

General information
- Location: San Juan de Lurigancho
- Named for: Miguel Castro Castro
- Year built: 1984–1986
- Inaugurated: October 27, 1986
- Owner: National Penitentiary Institute

Miguel Castro Castro Penitentiary Establishment (Spanish: Establecimiento Penitenciario Miguel Castro Castro), also known as Cantogrande Prison (Spanish: Penal de Cantogrande) is a low-security male-only prison operated by the National Penitentiary Institute (INPE) in San Juan de Lurigancho, a district of Lima, Peru. It is named for Miguel Castro Castro (d. 1985), a penitentiary servant assassinated during the Internal conflict in Peru.

Built between 1984 and 1986, the prison housed members of the Shining Path (PCP-SL) and the Túpac Amaru Revolutionary Movement (MRTA) during the Internal conflict in Peru. Other notable inmates have since included politicians, such as Jaime Yoshiyama, Daniel Urresti, Edwin Donayre, Luis Castañeda, César Villanueva, Luis Nava Guibert, among others.

== History ==
The two-storey building's construction began on August 8, 1984, concluding in February 1986. The prison's formal inauguration took place on October 27, 1986. Originally named after the neighbourhood where it is located, it was named after then director of El Frontón, Miguel Castro Castro, who was assassinated alongside his eight-year-old son Miguel Hugo on October 24, 1985, while leaving their apartment in Breña.

During the Internal conflict in Peru, the prison was home to several members of the Shining Path and the Túpac Amaru Revolutionary Movement (MRTA). On June 9, 1990, Víctor Polay and 47 other MRTA members escaped through the use of a tunnel. Between May 6–9, 1992, a military intervention was carried out to regain control of the prison, then in the hands of Shining Path members, which concluded with the deaths and injuries of several prisoners, some of which were subsequently subjected to different types of abuse.

== See also ==
- Santa Mónica Prison
