= Peruvian prison massacres =

1986 killings in Lima and Callao

- Part of the internal conflict in Peru
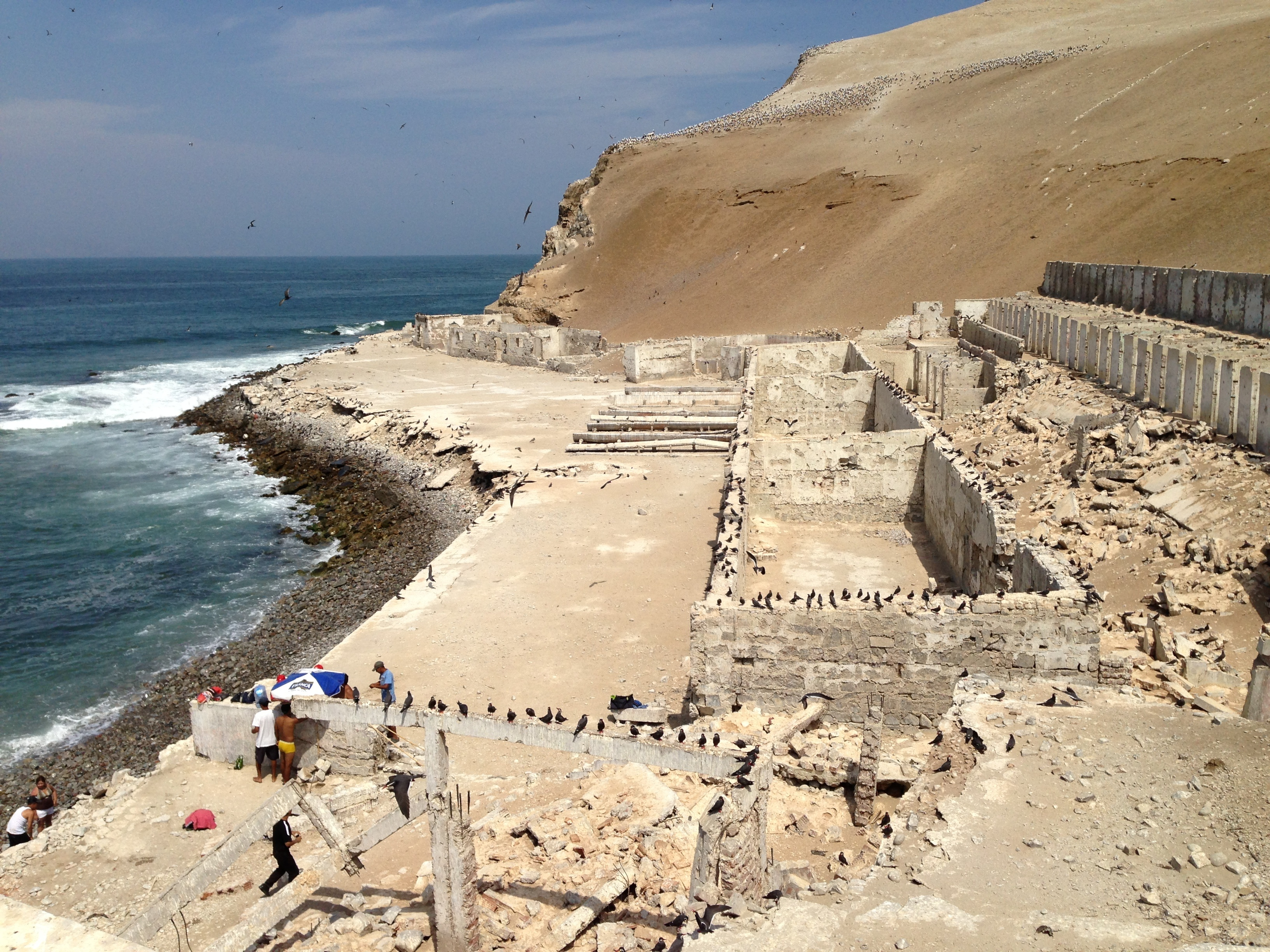
- Ruins of the prison at El Frontón
- Location: Lima (Lurigancho Prison) and Callao (El Frontón and Santa Bárbara prison), Peru
- Date: June 18–19, 1986
- Target: Imprisoned Shining Path collaborators
- Attack type: Massacres, mass executions
- Deaths: 224–300 executed
- Perpetrators: Peruvian Army (Grupo Colina); Peruvian Navy; Peruvian Republican Guard
- Motive: Anticommunism; Antiterrorism

The Peruvian prison massacres (Spanish: Matanza de los penales) occurred on June 18–19, 1986, after a series of riots in the Lurigancho, Santa Bárbara, and El Frontón prisons in Lima and Callao. The military repression of these riots resulted in at least 224 to 300 deaths.

== Antecedents ==
Shining Path poster of the prison at El Frontón

During the internal conflict in Peru, the bloody campaign by the Peruvian Maoist group Shining Path was responsible for the deaths of thousands of inhabitants of the rural regions of Peru. The Military of Peru, which had been dispatched to put down the insurgency, was also responsible for the deaths of thousands of Peruvians.

At the beginning of his 1985 to 1990 term, President Alan García demonstrated an interest in changing the counter-subversive strategy of his predecessor, Fernando Belaúnde Terry, with the purpose of reducing human rights violations against the civilian population, by calling on the civil society to propose solutions to the problem of political violence in Peru. Nevertheless, his government authorized a swift and violent takeover of the prisons to regain control, placing Peru's human rights violations back into the national and international spotlight.

== Riots ==
On June 18, 1986, at approximately 6:00 AM, prisoners rioted within multiple prison facilities in Lima and Callao. The riots took place while a congress of the Socialist International, of which Alan García's APRA political party was a member, was being conducted in Lima. The prisoners in San Juan de Lurigancho, El Frontón, and the women's prison in Santa Mónica, who had tacit control of the prison interiors, rose up and took prison guards and three journalists as hostages. They demanded the immediate release of 500 people imprisoned for terrorism. García and his government were caught off-guard by the uprising. At 10:00 AM, an emergency cabinet session began with García and senior military commanders present. Three hours later, the Minister of the Interior, Abel Salinas, announced that if the prisoners did not surrender, the prisons would be retaken by force. That day, the Shining Path launched a wave of attacks in Lima that left several dead.

== Negotiations ==
The government of Peru sent a negotiating commission formed by Caesar Samamé, Augusto Rodriguez Rabanal and Fernando Cabieses, arriving at El Frontón Prison at 4:30 PM. However, negotiations did not bring about results.

== Assault ==
6:00 PM, as the negotiations failed, the order to assault the prisons was given. The first attack began in the women's prison at Santa Mónica, where the Republican Guard, which at the time was responsible for protecting Peru's borders and prisons, regained control relatively quickly. They demolished a wall and sent tear and paralyzing gases into the prison. In two hours the hostages were released, and two people had died.

At midnight, June 19, the assault on the prison on the island of El Frontón commenced. The assault was carried out under the command of the Peruvian Navy. The director of the prison, a judge, and the public prosecutor had protested against the Navy's intervention, and declared that they were no longer responsible for what occurred inside the prison as a result of the assault. Meanwhile, from the island of El Frontón the vice-minister of the Interior, Agustín Mantilla, announced that the island was under the control of the Joint Command of the Armed Forces as it had been declared a restricted military zone. 3 members of the Peruvian navy died during the assault.

Later, the Navy, with Naval Infantry support, attacked the "Blue Ward" of El Frontón, which was where Shining Path guerrilla members were imprisoned. During the assault three members of the Peruvian Armed Forces, one of the hostages, and 135 prisoners were killed. Simultaneously, Republican Guard SWAT team arrived at Lurigancho prison, and placed explosives around the outer wall of the Industrial Pavilion Part prison where the Shining Path guerrillas held hostages. A joint offensive by troops of the Republican Guard and the Peruvian Army followed. At 3:00 am, after heavy fighting with guns and grenades, the guerrillas surrendered. Hours later, numerous prisoners who had occupied the building lay dead; most had been executed one by one with a shot to the nape of the neck.

According to a cable from the United States Department of State, "at least 100 prisoners were summarily executed." The Peruvian government itself concluded that all 124 rebellious prisoners in Lurigancho prison died in the assault, and that no fewer than 90 were victims of extrajudicial executions.

The national and international scandal that resulted from this multiple crime was enormous. During President García's delayed visit to the scene of the events, he declared that there were two possibilities: "either they [the authors of the massacre] go or I go." Nevertheless, nothing was ever done to punish the guilty. Luis Giampietri, the naval officer in command of the operation, later became Alan García's vice president.

== Congressional inquiry ==
The ensuing international outrage exerted enormous pressure on the Peruvian Government to establish an independent commission of inquiry. The Peruvian Congress quickly moved on to approve a special-mandated body in August 1986, but political negotiations regarding its composition dragged the appointment of its member for a whole year. Finally, in August 1987 the ad-hoc commission of inquiry's configuration was agreed consisting of six senators and seven representatives. The 13-member body comprised twelve men and one woman, with six seats assigned to opposition parties and seven to the Government party (APRA) and allies. However, the chair was yielded to one opposition figure, Senator Rolando Ames Cobián. The commission was granted 4 months to complete its probe and ultimately became deadlocked between two irreconcilable blocks: one supported by the opposition congressmen's that criticised the state's response and one loyal to the regime, which wanted to avoid attributing responsibility for the abuses.

== See also ==
- National Penitentiary Institute (Peru)
