= La Punta District =

District of Callao, Peru

La Punta
- District
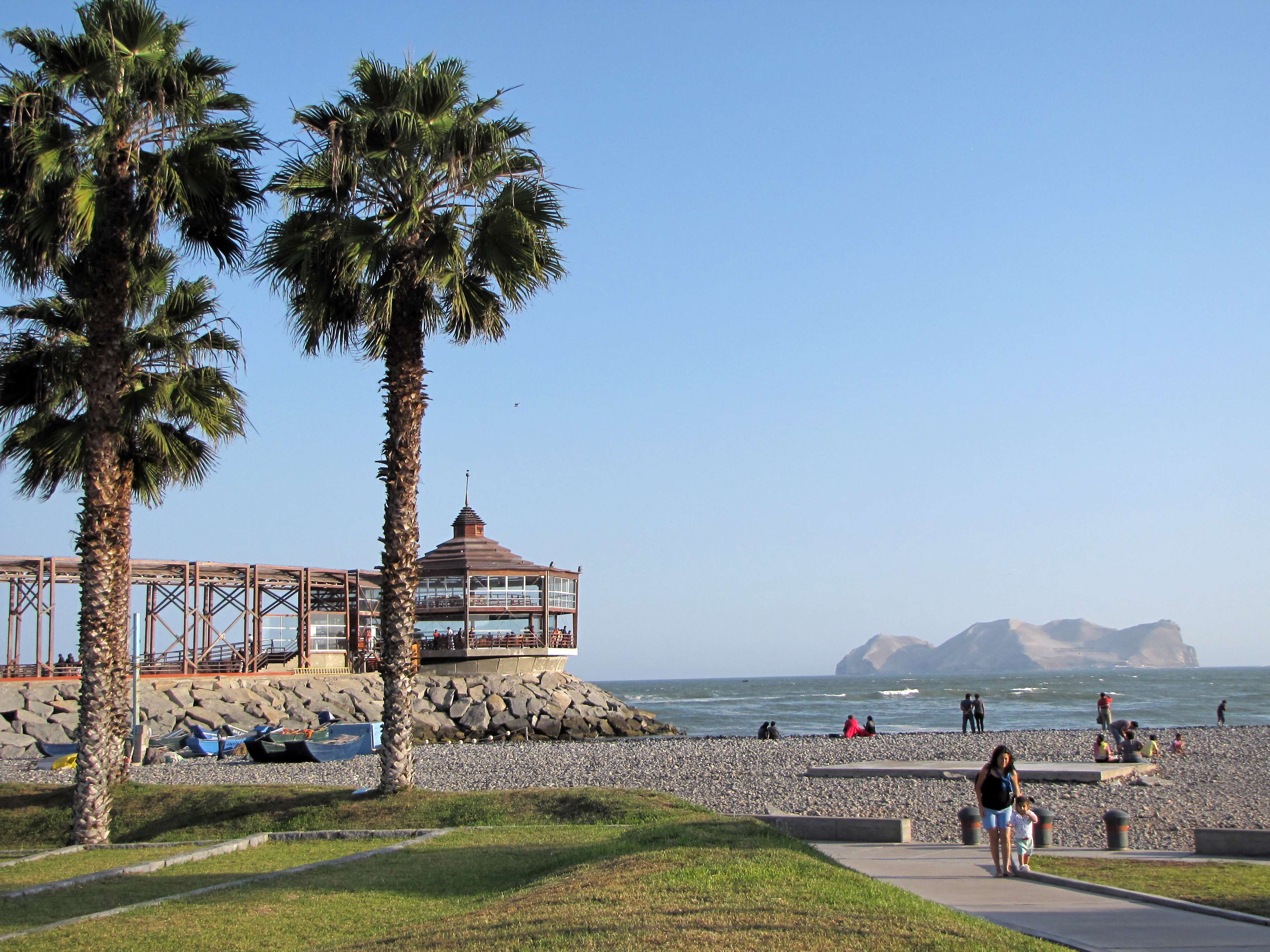
- View of El Malecón Beach

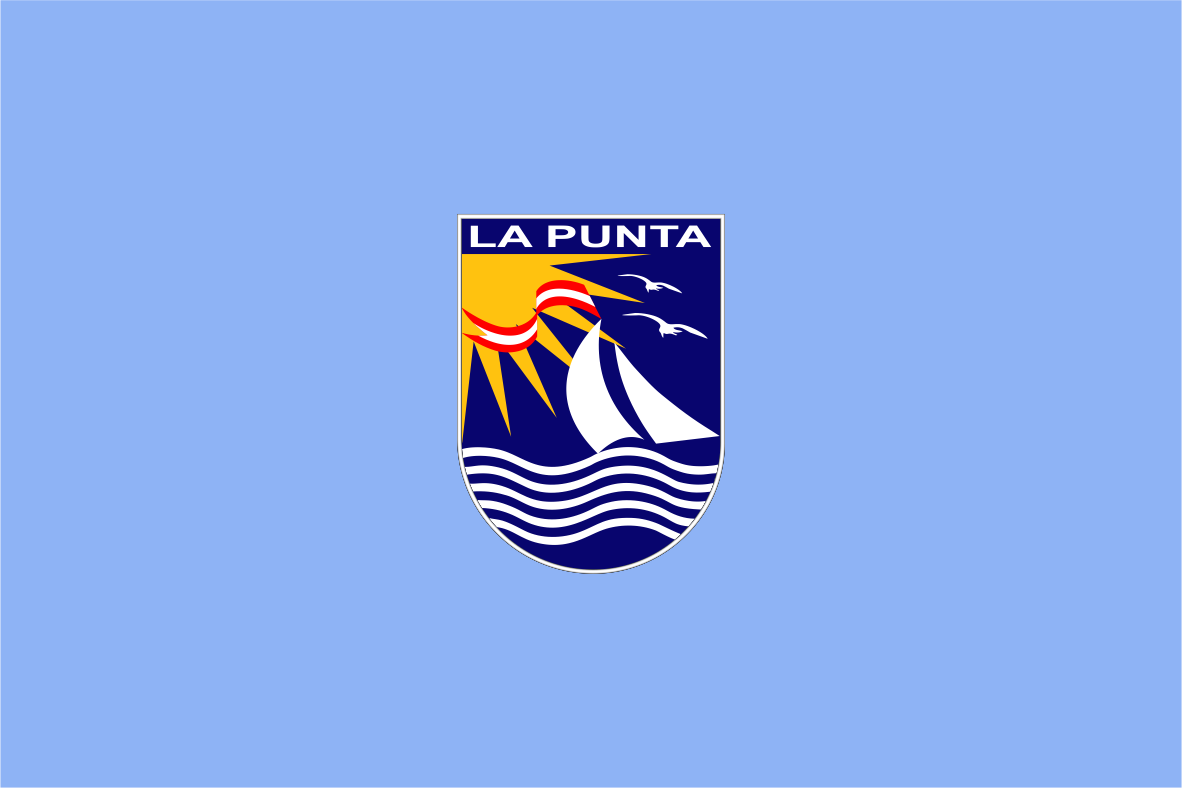
- Flag Coat of arms

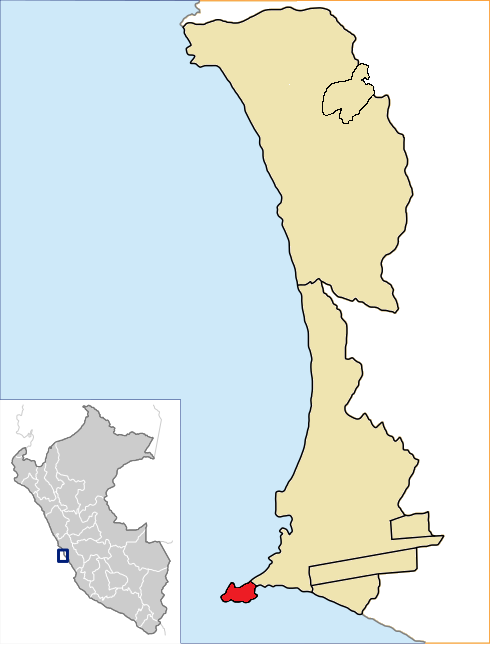
- Location in Callao
- Coordinates: 12°04′17″S 77°09′45″W
- Country: Peru
- Province: Callao
- Founded: October 6, 1915
- Capital: La Punta

Government
  - Mayor: Ramón Garay León

Area
  - Total: 0.38 km^{2} (0.15 sq mi)
- Elevation: 2 m (6.6 ft)

Population (2017)
  - Total: 3,829
  - Density: 10,000/km^{2} (26,000/sq mi)
- Time zone: UTC-5 (PET)
- UBIGEO: 070105
- Website: www.munilapunta.gob.pe

La Punta is a district of Callao, Peru. Officially established in 1915, it is located on the city's peninsula, and is almost entirely surrounded by the Pacific Ocean, except on its northeastern side, where it is bordered by downtown Callao.

Its current mayor of La Punta is Ramón Garay León.

== History ==
It was officially established as a district on October 6, 1915.

== Geography ==
The district has a total land area of 0.38 km^{2}. Its administrative center is located 2 meters above sea level.

=== Boundaries ===
- North, east, south and west: Pacific Ocean
- Northeast: Downtown Callao

== Demographics ==
According to a 2002 estimate by the INEI, the district has 7,246 inhabitants and a population density of 394.2 persons/km². In 1999, there were 1,248 households in the district.

La Punta has historically been settled by Italian Peruvians and their legacy can still be seen in the district.

== The district ==
Plaza Matriz (Main Square)

La Punta is mostly an upper middle class district, where Callao's most prestigious families have historically lived. Many of the district's old houses are still conserved.

La Punta has an earthquake alarm system which alerts the residents to evacuate the district, since one strong enough could create a tsunami and easily wipe out the peninsula.

La Punta is also one of the districts in which beaches are affected by the ocean current El Niño annually.

Almost one third of La Punta's territory is occupied by the Escuela Naval del Peru ("Peruvian Naval Academy").

The Club Regatas Unión is located on the upscale beachfront of La Punta. The district has three beaches: "Cantolao", "Malecón" and "La Arenilla". La Punta Racing Club is another club located in la Punta.

The chamber of Commerce of La Punta has been recently created to promote tourist projects and to create the guild of traders, as well as cultural programs and workshops in the district.

The main routes that connect La Punta with the rest of the Lima and Callao Metropolitan Area are the Avenida Almirante Grau and Coronel Bolognesi Avenues.

The San Lorenzo and El Frontón islands lie in front of La Punta and can clearly be seen from the district's beaches.

La Punta is a small district compared with others but is unique in its own right. Because of its geography and crime prevention program, the district has low levels of crime and is clean. Buildings range from modern to 19th-century manors.

== Beaches ==
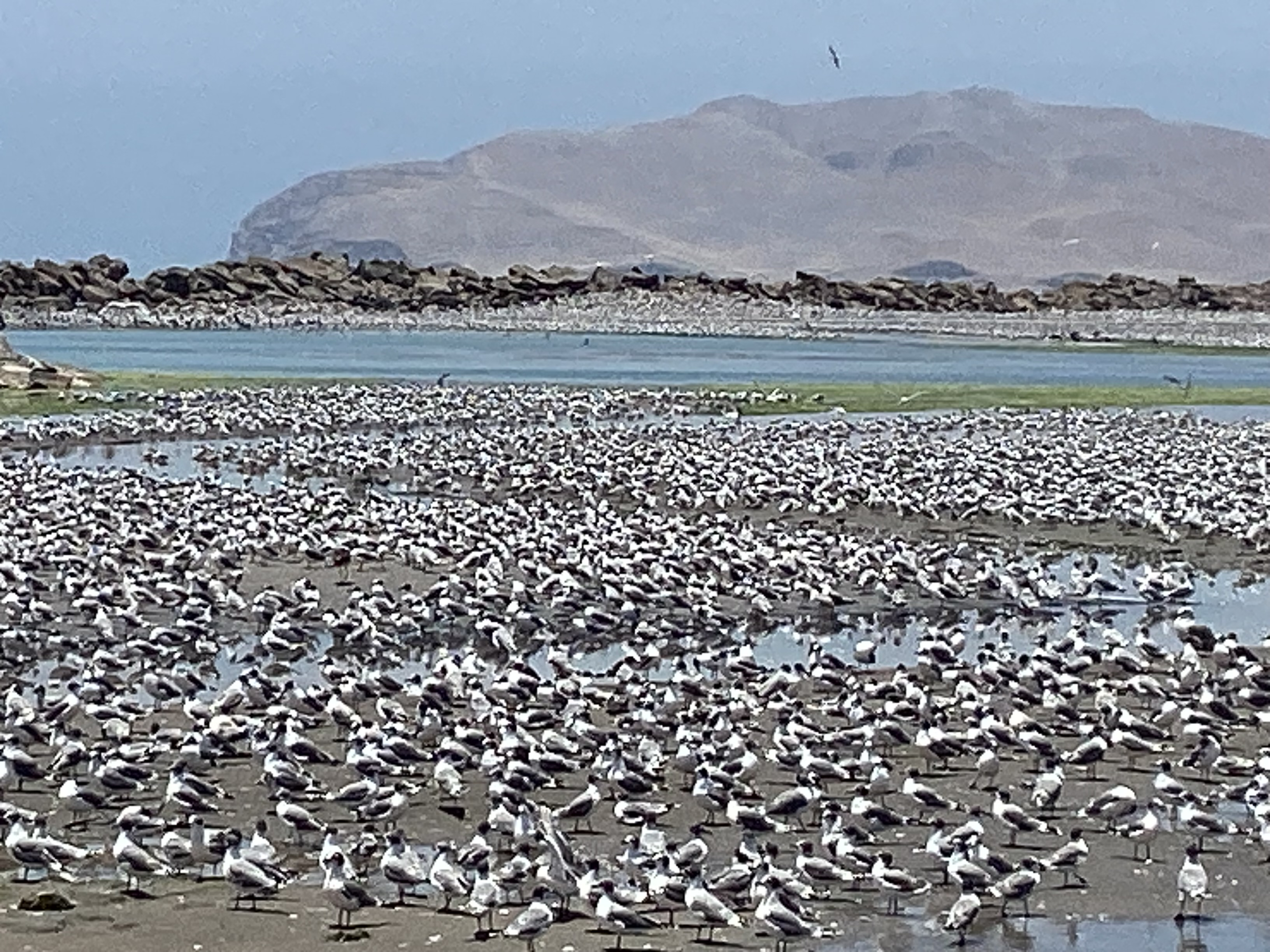
A beach full of Andean gulls

The beaches in La Punta are popular during the summer season because of their calm waters and small pebble composition (in contrast to Costa Verde in Lima where the surf is stronger and the beaches are mainly stone). Nevertheless La Punta is well known for their surprisingly frigid waters (Cantolao beach).

This calm sea favours the practice of rowing and yachting. La Punta is the district where most regattas are launched. Yacht Club del Peru has its main venue in La Punta in the beautiful Aspillaga House. There are four rowing clubs in La Punta: Club Universitario de Regatas, Club Regatas Union, Canottieri Italia, and Club de Regatas Lima. The Naval Academy has a rowing team and there are a few clubs that also practice there intermittently. There is heavy traffic of racing shells in the mornings. The bay is also full of recreational crafts of all sizes.

== Wildlife ==
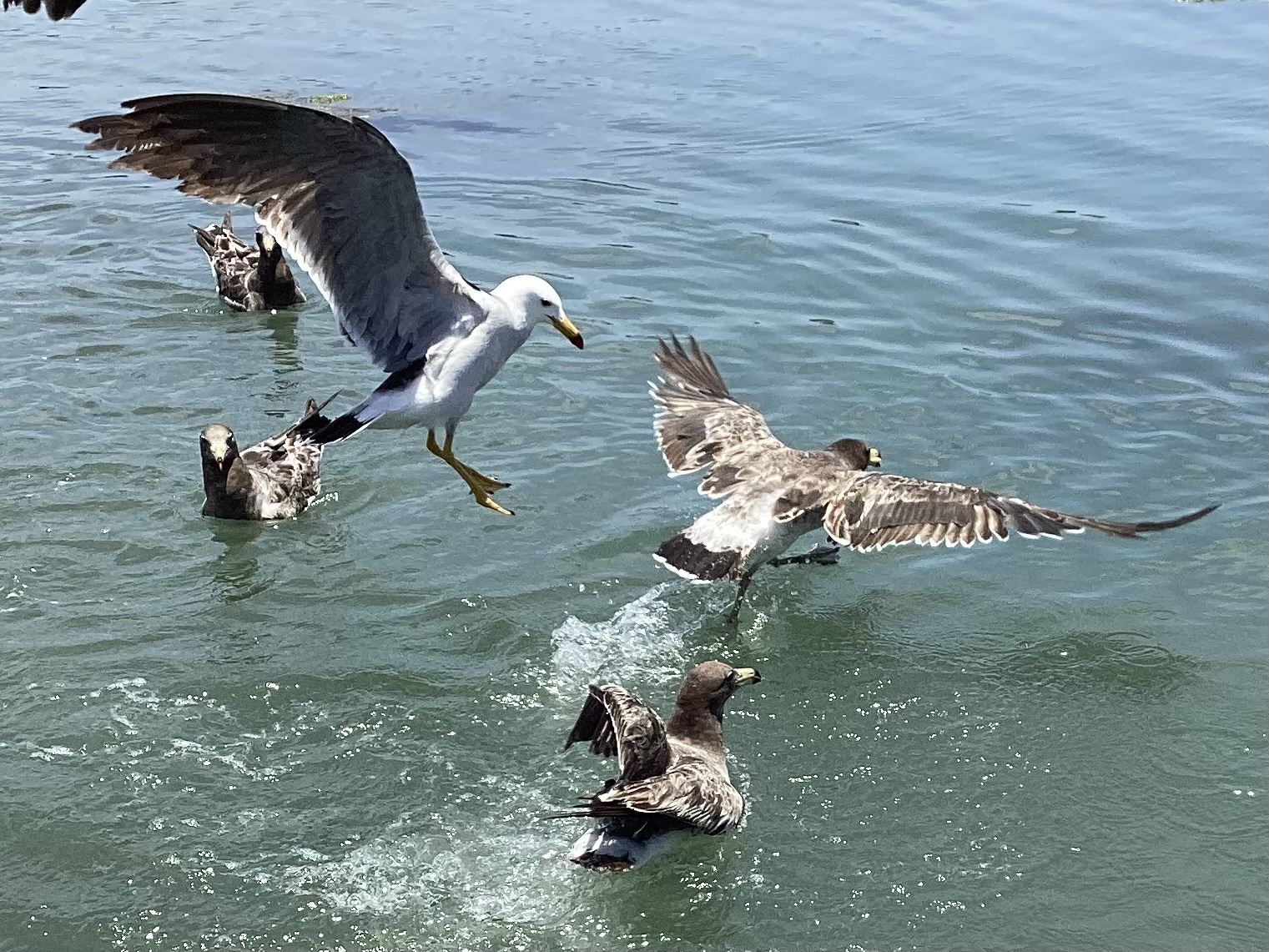
Adult and immature Belcher's gulls

Its wildlife are typically birds, including the non-native rock dove, and native species such as the Andean gull, Belcher's gull, Peruvian pelican, and blue-footed booby.

Local flora include several species of algae.

== See also ==
- Administrative divisions of Peru
