= El Frontón =

Island in Peru

El Frontón Island
Isla El Frontón (Spanish)
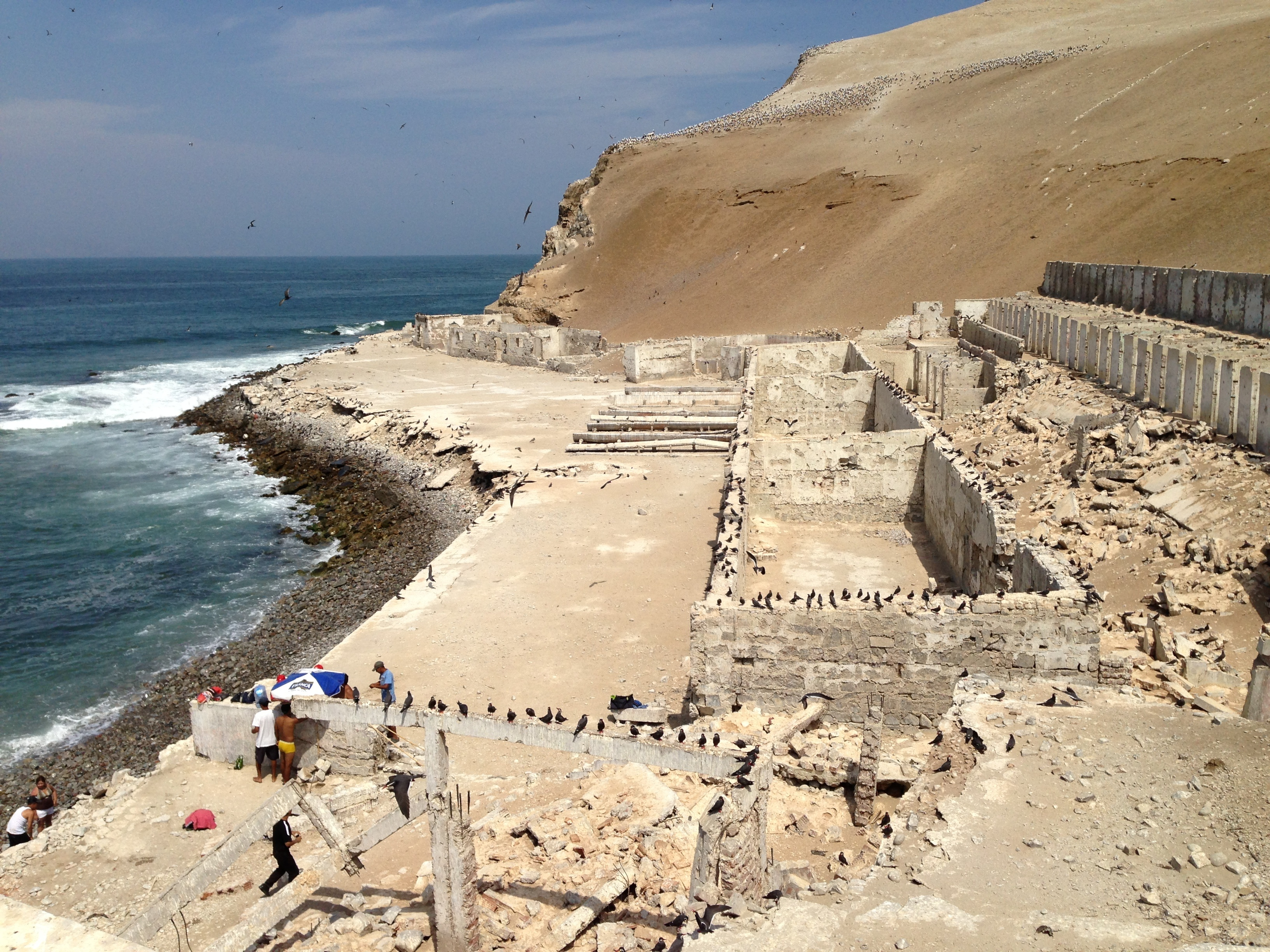
- Ruins of the former San Juan Bautista prison.

- Location within Peru

Geography
- Location: Pacific Ocean
- Coordinates: 12°07′00″S 77°10′54″W
- Area: 1 km^{2} (0.39 sq mi)

Administration
- Peru
- Region: Callao

Additional information
- Time zone: PET (UTC-5)

El Frontón is a deserted island and former penal colony off the coast of Callao, Peru.

== Geography ==
Dry, deserted and without vegetation, it is located 7 km from the coast, to the west of La Punta District and to the southeast of San Lorenzo Island. It has an approximate area of 1 km^{2} and is frequented by marine animals such as sea lions and the Humboldt penguin.

== History ==
From its viceregal era up until the early 19th century, the island was inhabited only by pirates and privateers, and was also known by the nickname of Dead Man's Island (Spanish: La Isla del Muerto).

=== Prison ===
Shining Path poster of the prison at El Frontón

The island became a penal colony in the early 20th century, starting in 1917, under president José Pardo's second administration. Initially a maximum security prison, the island eventually housed political prisoners, such as future president Fernando Belaúnde Terry, who, during his imprisonment, made an unsuccessful attempt to swim to freedom. Hugo Blanco was also imprisoned on the island. The prison was renamed to San Juan Bautista Prison in 1981.

During the insurgency of the Shining Path, the island was used as a prison for Maoist militants. On June 18, 1986, the Shining Path led an uprising in El Frontón's Blue Pavilion (Spanish: Pabellón Azul), as well as two other prisons. The government of Alan García treated the prisons as war zones, and the Peruvian Navy was sent to the island. Many of the prisoners involved in the rebellion were killed, and Human Rights Watch claimed that evidence suggested that "no fewer than ninety" of the prisoners killed were victims of extrajudicial executions. The behavior of the Peruvian Government during the uprising in the prison led to censure by the Inter-American Court of Human Rights.

=== Notable prisoners ===
- Fernando Belaúnde Terry, two times president of Peru.
- Hugo Blanco, trotskyist politician.
- Víctor Raúl Haya de la Torre, founder of the American Popular Revolutionary Alliance
- Guillermo Portugal Delgado, a criminal who escaped by dressing up as a woman, then killing a sea lion and swimming to shore.

== In popular culture ==
The island is the main setting for Alberto Durant's 1991 film Alias 'La Gringa', based on Portugal's story.
