= Anti-Fujimorism =

Opposition to Fujimorism

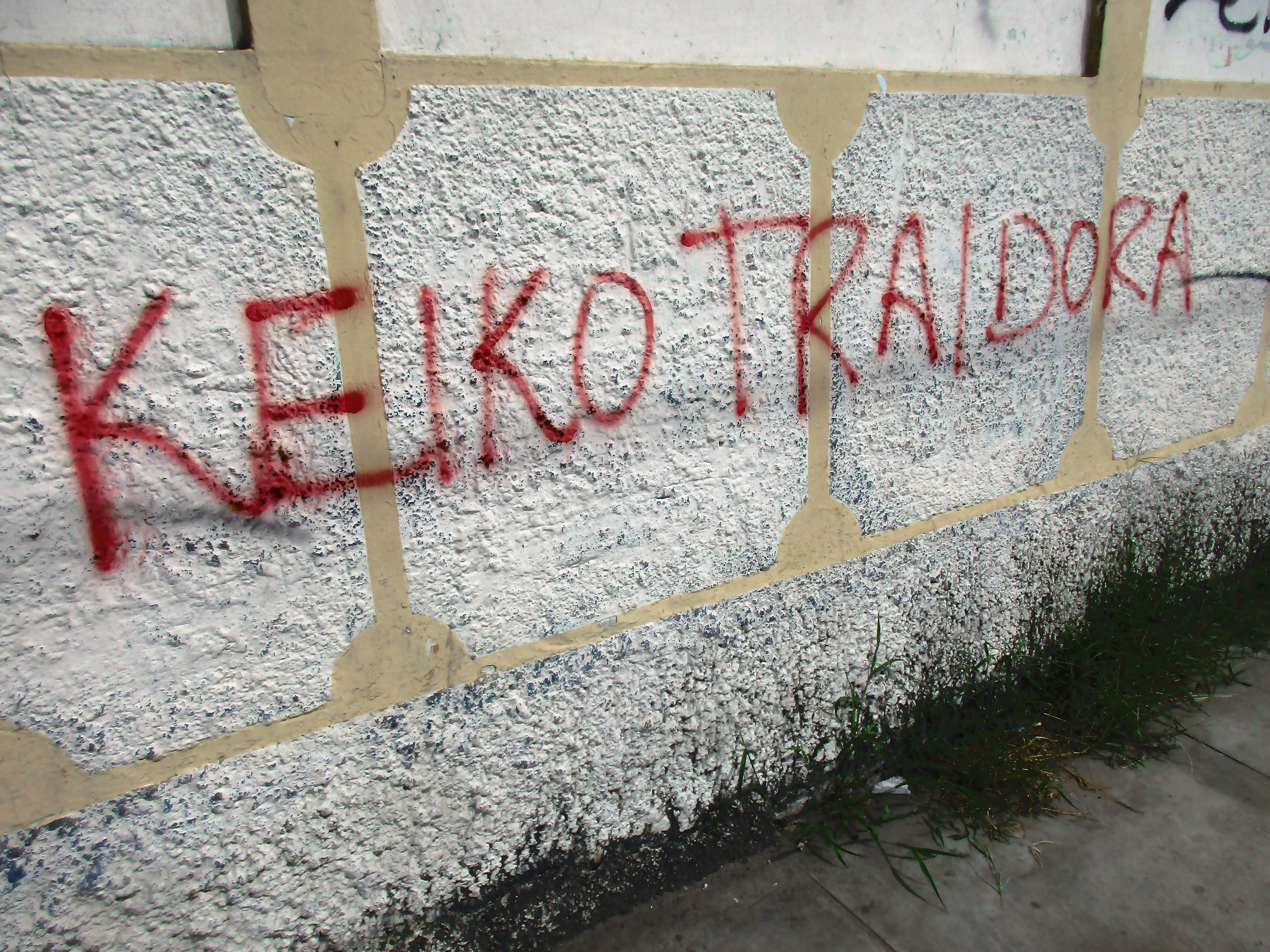
Graffiti reading "Keiko traitor" in Spanish

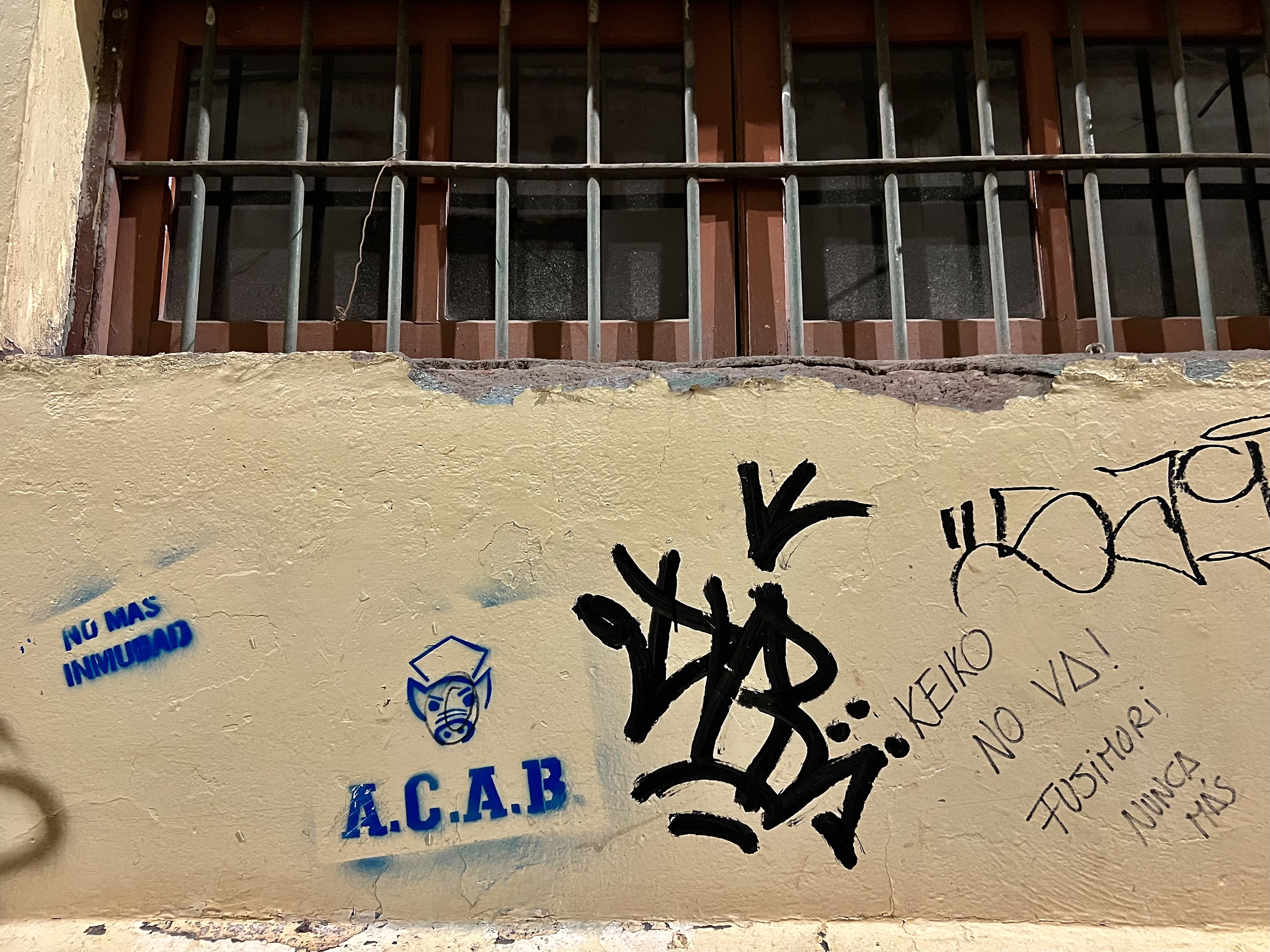
ACAB beside anti-Fujimorist graffiti in Cusco following the 2021 Peruvian general election

Anti-Fujimorism (Spanish: antifujimorismo) is a political movement characterized by an opposition to Fujimorism, the ideology of former Peruvian president Alberto Fujimori and his daughter Keiko Fujimori. The movement has broad support across the political spectrum, with many opponents from the left, center, and right coming out against Fujimorism. The movement properly organized itself after the 1992 Peruvian coup d'état, in which Fujimori illegally gave himself additional powers by unilaterally dissolving the Congress of Peru. Throughout the rest of his reign (1992–2000), the movement strongly opposed the increasingly authoritarian and populist measures of his government. After the end of his rule in November 2000, the anti-Fujimorist coalition has been one of the most influential oppositionary voices in Peruvian general elections, opposing the Fujimorist political parties Peru 2000 in 2000, Cambio 90 – New Majority in 2001, Alliance for the Future in 2006, and Popular Force in 2011, 2016, 2021, and 2026.

Anti-Fujimorism has been described as "the largest informal political group" or "the largest political party" in Peru, given its impact in the consecutive defeats of the Fujimorist candidate Keiko Fujimori (daughter of Alberto Fujimori) in the presidential elections of 2011, 2016, and 2021, all three by slim margins; Keiko Fujimori would be elected Peru's president in 2026. The movement is also against the pardon of Alberto Fujimori (a campaign promise of Keiko), who was convicted of human rights abuses and corruption, among other crimes.

Adherents of anti-Fujimorism claim their goal to be "defending democracy and national dignity" and "[ensuring] compliance with the law and the Constitution." They also accuse Fujimorists of seeking to "exercise power without control or supervision" and "evading justice." Critics of anti-Fujimorism claim that it is "based on hatred and revenge" and involves "subversive" political groups.

== Characterization ==
Although anti-Fujimorism emerged as an organized movement after the self-coup of 1992; its characterization as a movement in itself, according to Czech-Peruvian political scientist Mirko Lauer, is that "[anti-Fujimorism] has depended on what Fujimorism itself has been [...] [anti-Fujimorism is] led mainly by people who claim to be liberals, leftists or parties of other supposed right wings that do not exist with their own interests". César Hildebrandt, one of the country's leading journalists, describes the group as "a defense mechanism whose purpose is to preserve us as a country".

== History ==
=== The Fujimorato ===
External image
- Vladivideo Kouri-Montesinos, showing presidential adviser Vladimiro Montesinos handing bribes to a political operative to cover up the acts of corruption of the Fujimori government.

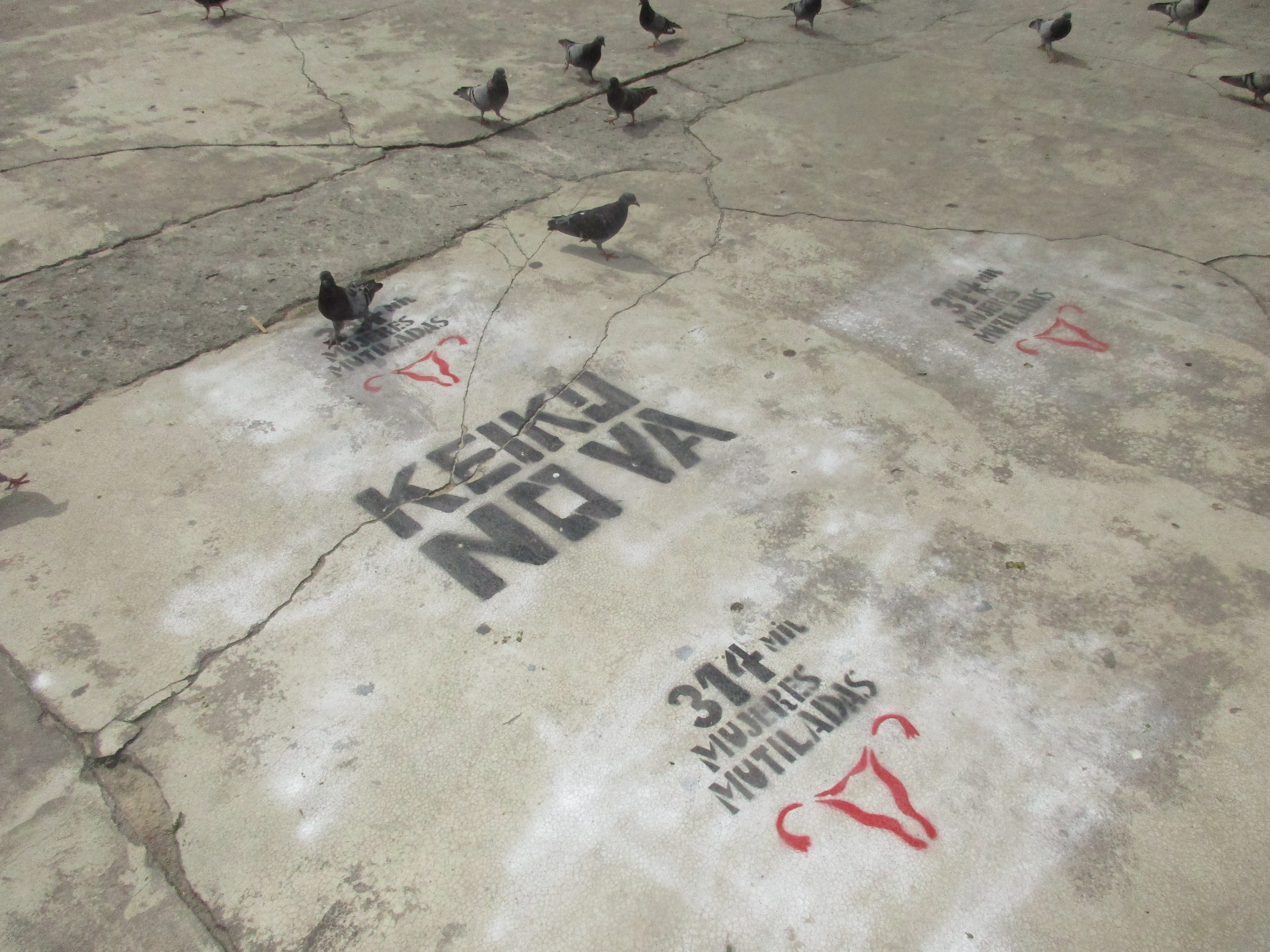
Graffiti against Keiko Fujimori during the 2016 general election, alluding to the forced sterilizations attributed to her father's government.

In the 2000 Peruvian general elections, after a contested electoral process marked by allegations of electoral fraud and the withdrawal in the runoff of the opposition candidate Alejandro Toledo, Alberto Fujimori assumed the presidency for the third time amid widespread protests known as the March of the Four Suyos. However, the Fujimorist coalition Peru 2000 did not obtain a majority in Congress, so it resorted, as would later become known, to the purchase of turncoat parliamentarians by presidential adviser Vladimiro Montesinos. The broadcast of the vladivideo Kouri-Montesinos (14 September 2000) triggered widespread protests against the regime and the calling of immediate general elections by Fujimori. Amid the generalized political crisis, Fujimori traveled to the APEC Conference in Brunei; on the return trip, his plane was diverted to Japan, from where he sent his resignation (20 November 2000). The Peruvian Congress, now dominated by the opposition, did not accept his resignation and removed him for moral incapacity (22 November 2000), with Valentín Paniagua, president of Congress, assuming the presidency of the Republic. Months later, the political party Peru Possible participated in the 2001 elections; according to that party's secretary, Juan Sheput, it was supported by a current opposed to Fujimori.

=== Judicial process against Fujimori (2005–2009) ===
After taking refuge in Japan following his removal from the presidency, Fujimori remained in that country taking advantage of his dual nationality (Peruvian-Japanese). Despite having an arrest warrant issued by the Peruvian Supreme Court since 2001, Fujimori traveled to Chile, arriving on 6 November 2005. The following day, he was detained by the Chilean police, and the Peruvian state initiated an extradition request against him to be tried, among other crimes, for the Barrios Altos and La Cantuta massacres.

On 21 September 2007, the Chilean Supreme Court approved Fujimori's extradition to Peru; the following day he arrived in Lima. On 7 April 2009, the Peruvian judiciary sentenced him to 25 years in prison for human rights violations: the Barrios Altos and La Cantuta killings, and the kidnappings of Gustavo Gorriti and Samuel Dyer. Anti-Fujimorist sectors supported the sentence: the Peruvian writer Mario Vargas Llosa stated that "the sentence is impeccable and should be applauded by all democrats".

In 2017, President Pedro Pablo Kuczynski issued a pardon of Fujimori. This was denounced by Robert Prevost, who later became Pope Leo XIV, and he emphasized the victims of the Peruvian Army, particularly the Grupo Colina, during the period of terrorism. Prevost also criticized Fujimori's corruption, telling Fujimori "to personally apologize for some of the great injustices that were committed".

=== 2011 general election ===
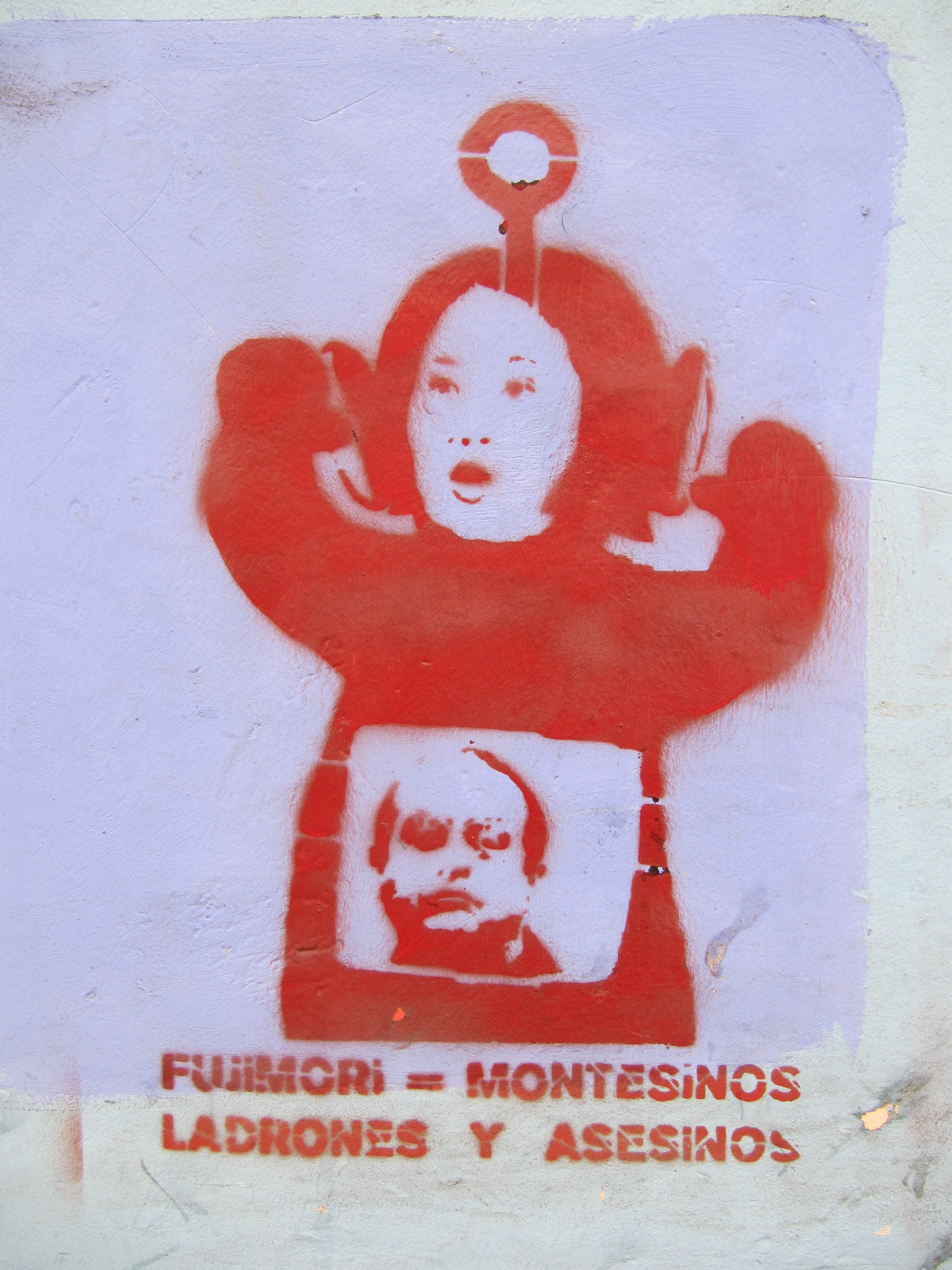
Anti-Fujimorist graffiti depicting Keiko Fujimori and Vladimiro Montesinos as a Teletubby (2011)

In the first round of the 2011 elections, candidates Ollanta Humala (Peruvian Nationalist Party) and Keiko Fujimori (Popular Force) advanced to the runoff. Polls initially gave Humala an advantage; however, after several weeks, they became progressively more favorable to Keiko. Following this, a so-called "anti-Fujimorist coalition" was formed, initially composed of progressive groups and human rights advocates.

On 25 May 2011, the Spanish newspaper El País published the manifesto "Contra el regreso del fujimorismo y a favor de la democracia", signed initially by 68 Peruvian writers, to which other intellectuals later joined, stating:

The writers who sign this letter come from very different places in the Peruvian political spectrum and have divergent ideas about how Peru's economic and social management should be handled. [...] we call on society to maintain its power of representation, rejecting the return of dictatorship and strengthening, through the vote for Ollanta Humala, with an active and vigilant attitude, our democratic order. Ours is a hopeful and optimistic call for national unity: this 5 June, Peruvians must defend, through a responsible and civic vote, our dignity, our freedom and our democracy.

The following day, a march of various anti-Fujimorist groups took place in Lima (the No a Keiko collective, Colectivo Dignidad, the General Confederation of Workers of Peru, the Central Única de Trabajadores, IDL Reporteros, Asociación Pro Derechos Humanos, National Coordinator for Human Rights, etc.), which gathered more than 20,000 people.

On 5 June 2011, the second round of voting took place, in which Humala was elected president. One of the factors in his election was the association of Fujimori with the authoritarian past of her father.

=== Political crisis (2021–present) ===
With a new candidacy in 2021, the Popular Force party alleged a supposed fraud amid fears of alleged "communist" influence by rival Pedro Castillo. After Castillo's removal following an attempted self-coup in 2022, various sectors of the population nationwide took to the streets to protest against Dina Boluarte and demanded the advancement of elections, in what was called the "social upheaval". A study by Ipsos in July 2023 indicated that 61% of respondents would definitely not vote for Keiko.

In 2025, writer Álvaro Vargas Llosa stated that "Peruvian democracy was unable for decades to overcome the hatred between Fujimorists and anti-Fujimorists, and polarization ended up contaminating all institutions and entrenching irreconcilable positions".

In 2026, Keiko Fujimori was elected Peru's president in a narrow victory, with Popular Force winning a plurality in the country's bicameral Congress.

== See also ==
- No to Keiko
- Anti-Gaullism
