= Santiago Martín Rivas =

- Born: 4 November 1957 (age 68); Lucma, Peru
- Military career
- Allegiance: Peru
- Branch: Peruvian Army
- Rank: Major
- Commands: Grupo Colina
- Conflicts: Internal Conflict in Peru, La Cantuta Massacre, Barrios Altos Massacre, Santa Massacre
- Other work: Currently imprisoned

Santiago Martín Rivas (born 4 November 1957) was a major in the Peruvian Army, a member of the Army Intelligence Service, and the leader of a death squad known as Grupo Colina, responsible for several massacres, kidnappings, murders and forced disappearances during the era of terrorism during the government of Alberto Fujimori.

In 1994, he was sentenced to 20 years in prison for human rights violations, but was later pardoned by the Fujimori majority-controlled Congress. In 2002, Martín Rivas was arrested again on charges of perpetrating the La Cantuta and Barrios Altos massacres, as well as the murder of his former partner, agent Mariela Barreto. In 2010, he was sentenced to 25 years in prison.

== Biography ==
Santiago Enrique Martín Rivas studied at the Chorrillos Military School, graduating as a second lieutenant in the engineering branch on January 1, 1978, as part of the 82nd "Lieutenant Luis García Ruiz" class. In 1981, he participated in the False Paquisha conflict, where he met his mentor, Captain José Colina, who died in 1984 under mysterious circumstances. In 1983, he met Benedicto Jiménez, who would later become head of the GEIN and with whom he would maintain a rivalry.

He worked in the army in the fight against insurrection. In 1987, he joined the Army Intelligence Service (SIE), attached to the Army Intelligence Directorate (DINTE). In 1988, he met Vladimiro Montesinos during the Cayara Case, a scandal that engulfed the army due to the indiscriminate attack on the population of Cayara by troops following an attack by the Shining Path. At that time, Martín Rivas acted as the case manager and liaison with Montesinos, who was acting as an informant, on the orders of Colonel Osvaldo Hanke Velasco, head of the SIE. At the end of the 1980s, he traveled to Colombia where he studied at the Colombian Intelligence School. During the 1990 presidential campaign, Martín Rivas worked on an anti-subversive plan as a member of the SIE, which was proposed to FREDEMO, the party of then-candidate Mario Vargas Llosa, because the army supported Vargas Llosa's candidacy. In December 1990, Martín Rivas was summoned to Peru from Colombia. Upon his arrival, he was received by agents of the National Intelligence Service (SIN), who took him to a meeting with Montesinos. Although Martín Rivas did not belong to the SIN, he attended its meetings as a representative of the army. After the capture of the Shining Path archives by the GEIN, Martín Rivas was one of those in charge of analyzing said documents. As a result of the analysis, Martín Rivas, together with Carlos Pichilingue, prepared a report on how to confront Shining Path. For this action they received a commendation from Fujimori in June 1991. From this report a meeting titled the "Round Table Meeting" was organized with the presence of high military commanders where Martín Rivas explained the strategies of the Shining Path and the recommendation to move to low-intensity warfare where "terrorism would be confronted with its own methods" with the objective that "no Shining Path member feels safe anywhere." The meeting ended with the approval of the recommendations.

In 1991, while living undercover, he had a daughter with non-commissioned officer Mariela Barreto, an intelligence agent and subordinate of Martín Rivas. That same year, together with other army officers, he formed the so-called Colina Group, and they committed their first major paramilitary action: the Barrios Altos massacre. Martín Rivas, according to Sosa Saavedra (member of the aforementioned group), would call that group "Lima".

== Judicial processes ==
On May 3, 1994, after a court martial, Martín Rivas was sentenced to 20 years in prison for human rights violations. After serving thirteen months in the Simón Bolívar Barracks in Pueblo Libre, he was granted a presidential amnesty on June 14, 1995. This sentence was annulled after Fujimori fled Peru. After the 1995 amnesty, Martín Rivas remained living in the Bolívar Barracks, where he had been imprisoned. During his stay in the Bolívar Barracks (until March 1997), he was subjected to surveillance by Montesinos' agents. By 1997, Martín Rivas was no longer working for either the SIN or the SIE.

On March 23, 1997, on the road to Canta, the dismembered and decapitated corpse of Mariela Barreto was found, who, along with another SIN agent, Leonor La Rosa (who claimed to have been tortured), was suspected of leaking information about the Grupo Colina's crimes to the press. Martín Rivas was identified as the prime suspect in Barreto's death, although Martín Rivas stated that such action was carried out by Montesinos.

In 1998, agent Mesmer Carles Talledo accused Grupo Colina of perpetrating of the murder of trade unionist Pedro Huillca. To investigate the case, a parliamentary commission was created in which Martín Rivas had to testify as the leader of the paramilitary group, denying its existence. To escape from the victims' families, who were waiting for him at the door of Congress, he had to flee through a window.

In 2001 Martín Rivas went into hiding, and despite having an arrest warrant, he was not dismissed from the army, and thus continued to collect a state pension. As a fugitive from justice, he gave several interviews to journalist Umberto Jara in different places to avoid being captured by the authorities. In one of them, recorded on video, he revealed that former President Alberto Fujimori ordered the creation of Grupo Colina; a group that Rivas pointed out on Canal N as the author of the La Cantuta and Barrios Altos massacres. Jara subsequently published the book Ojo por ojo, in which he compiled the statements of Martín Rivas about the crimes of the paramilitary group he led. According to statements by Martín Rivas, he accepted the interviews because he felt helpless and betrayed by his benefactors in the Peruvian Army.

After a two-year investigation by the Ministry of the Interior, Martín Rivas was captured on November 18, 2002, while giving an interview to Jara at his home in the Lima district of San Miguel. During his transfer to the corresponding police station, he was repeatedly called "Murderer!" by human rights organizations and by relatives of many of the victims of Grupo Colina. He was interrogated about the disappearance of journalist Pedro Yauri in Huacho.

In 2006, the Inter-American Court of Human Rights ordered the reopening of the Cantuta case, and Martín Rivas was again tried, this time in a civilian court.

In 2010, he was sentenced to twenty-five years in prison, along with the former advisor of President Fujimori during his term, Vladimiro Montesinos, and the former commander-in-chief of the army, Nicolás Hermoza Ríos, among others; in a trial held for the massacres of Barrios Altos, La Cantuta, and the murder and disappearance of journalist Pedro Yauri. He was also prosecuted along with Montesinos, among others, for the torture, murder, and dismemberment of former intelligence agent Mariela Barreto.

In 2024, during the judicial process for the Pativilca massacre, Martín Rivas showed no signs of remorse for his actions and threatened those who have tried to bring justice for the crimes committed by the Armed Forces.

== Bibliography ==
- Jara, Umberto (September 9, 2017). Ojo por ojo. Grupo Planeta - Perú. ISBN 9786123191962.
