= El ritmo del Chino =

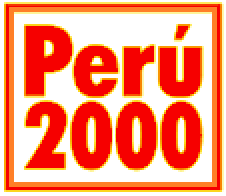

Song by Mónica Cevallos Paredes
- Published: 2000
- Genre: Tecnocumbia
- Songwriters: Mónica Cevallos Paredes; Carlos Raffo

"El ritmo del Chino" ("The rhythm of the Chinaman"), sometimes called "El baile del Chino" is a technocumbia song created for the political campaign of the 2000 elections of the Peruvian president and candidate for re-election Alberto Fujimori, who is affectionately nicknamed El Chino ("the Chinaman") despite him being of Japanese descent.

Alberto Fujimori died on September 11, 2024, one day after his death, the peruvian Technocumbia singer Ana Kholer revealed by very first time that Fujimori himself was the real creator of the lyrics "El ritmo del Chino"

== Description ==
The song was created by singer Mónica Cevallos Paredes and Carlos Raffo, director of the fujimorist campaign, and is interpreted by Mónica Cevallos. For years, Ana Kohler was mistakenly confused with the singer, who at that time was one of the most representative exponents of the technocumbia genre, very in vogue in Peru at the end of the 1990s. According to a report in Caretas magazine, the song would be written by Eder Santiago or Kevin Borda.

With a catchy rhythm and simple lyrics, with the chorus of "¡Chino, Chino!, ¡Chino, Chino, Chino!" the music video of the song, used during the second round, presents images of some rallies of the ruling party Peru 2000 enlivened by Kohler and her dancers. The political involvement in which Kohler was involved, after the Fujimori corruption scandals investigated after the resignation, capture and trial of Fujimori, caused her musical career to end and he migrated with her family to the United States in 2003.

The song served as the musical background for the popular presentations of the candidate Fujimori, who appeared with his daughter Keiko Fujimori, dancing on stage. "El ritmo del Chino" inaugurated a new populist way of electoral campaign, preferring fashionable music to political messages and proposals.

In 2018, after the presidential pardon of Fujimori by Pedro Pablo Kuczynski, a new version of the song was viralized on social networks.

Lyrics
I Este es el baile, este es el ritmo, que a todos encanta, el ritmo del Chino; Ya está en la costa, ya llegó a la sierra, También en la selva, El ritmo del Chino. Coro : | : Y se baila así, y se mueve así El ritmo del Chino es el de Perú 2000. Y te gusta a ti, Y me gusta a mí, El ritmo del Chino es el de Perú 2000. Puente : ¡Chino! ¡Chino! ¡Chino, Chino! ¡Chino, Chino, Chino! ¡Chino! ¡Chino! ¡Chino, Chino! ¡Chino, Chino, Chino! : | II Todo el pueblo quiere (¡Chino!) el ritmo del Chino, (¡Chino!) El Perú prefiere (¡Chino, Chino!) el ritmo del Chino. (¡Chino, Chino, Chino!)	I This is the dance, this is the beat, that everyone loves, the rhythm of the Chinaman; It's now in the coast, It arrived now in the mountains, and the jungle too, The rhythm of the Chinaman. Chorus : | : And it's danced like this, and it moves like this, The rhythm of the Chinaman is that of Peru 2000. And you like it, and I like it, The rhythm of the Chinaman is that of Peru 2000. Bridge : Chinaman! Chinaman! Chinaman! Chinaman! Chinaman! Chinaman! Chinaman! Chinaman! Chinaman! Chinaman! Chinaman! Chinaman! Chinaman! Chinaman! : | II All the people want (Chinaman!) the rhythm of the Chinaman, (Chinaman!) Peru prefers (Chinaman! Chinaman!) the rhythm of the Chinaman. (Chinaman! Chinaman! Chinaman!)
