= Arrest and trial of Alberto Fujimori =

Alberto Fujimori
- アルベルト・フジモリ (藤森 謙也)
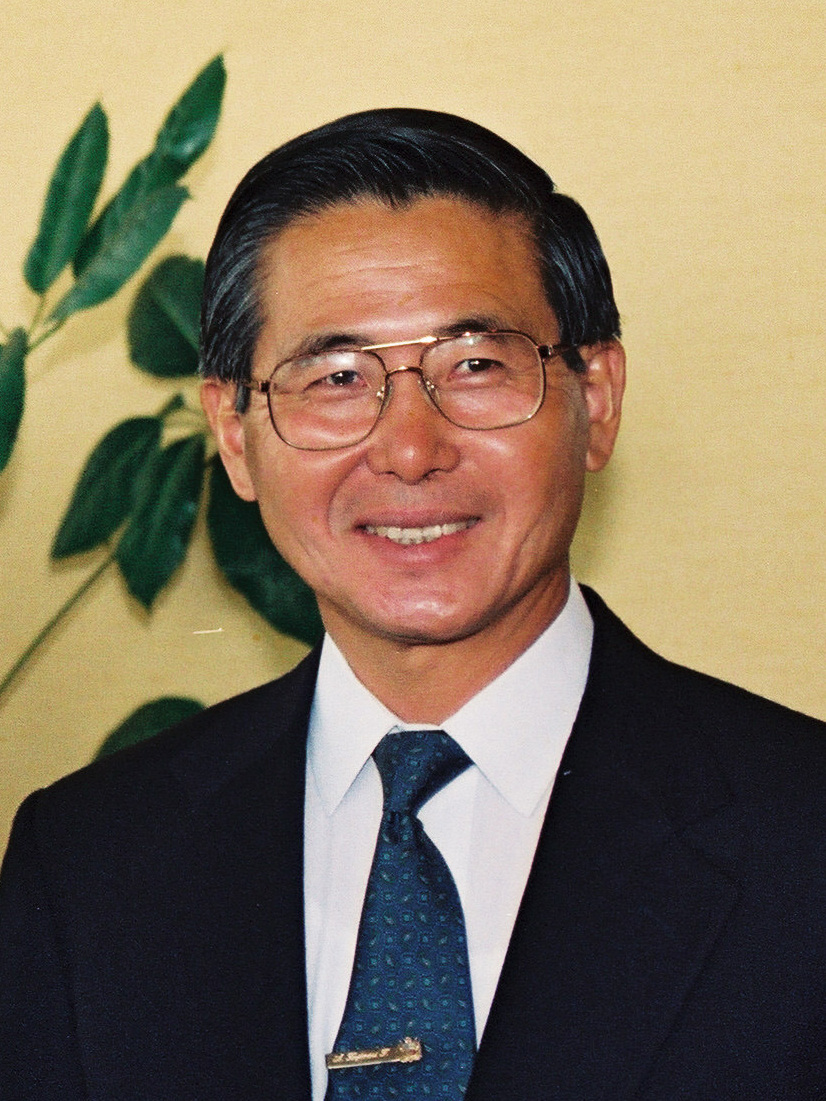
- Fujimori in October 1991
- Born: 28 July 1938; Lima, Peru
- Died: 11 September 2024 (aged 86); Lima, Peru
- Citizenship: Peru; Japan
- Occupation: Former President of Peru
- Spouses: Susana Higuchi (divorced): Satomi Kataoka
- Status: Convicted
- Criminal charges: Human rights abuses, murder, kidnapping, embezzlement, abuse of power, bribery and corruption
- Penalty: 25 years in prison (human rights abuses, murder and kidnapping charges); Six years in prison (abuse of power charges); Seven and one-half years in prison (embezzlement charges); Six years in prison (corruption and bribery charges)

In 2000, former Peruvian president Alberto Fujimori fled Peru during his incumbency and took refuge in Japan, following multiple criminal charges of corruption and human rights abuses filed by the Congress of the Republic of Peru against him. While in Japan he submitted his presidential resignation via fax. Peru's legislature refused to accept his resignation, instead voting on November 22, 2000 to remove Fujimori from office on the grounds that he was "permanently morally disabled".

Peru had requested Fujimori's extradition from Japan, which was refused by the Japanese government due to Fujimori being a Japanese citizen, and Japanese laws stipulating against extraditing its citizens.

In November 2005, Fujimori was arrested by authorities in Santiago, Chile while visiting the country, following an arrest warrant by a Chilean judge on behalf of Peru. He was formally extradited to Peru around September 2007. In December 2007, Fujimori was convicted of ordering an illegal search and seizure, and was sentenced to six years in prison. The Peruvian Supreme Court upheld the decision upon his appeal. In April 2009 Fujimori was convicted of human rights violations and sentenced to 25 years in prison for his role in killings and kidnappings by the Grupo Colina death squad during his government's battle against far-left guerrillas in the 1990s.

The verdict, delivered by a three-judge panel, marked the first time that an elected head of state has been extradited to his home country, tried, and convicted of human rights violations. Fujimori was specifically found guilty of murder, bodily harm, and two cases of kidnapping. In July 2009 Fujimori was sentenced to seven and a half years in prison for embezzlement after he admitted to giving $15 million from the Peruvian treasury to his intelligence service chief, Vladimiro Montesinos. Two months later he pled guilty in a fourth trial to bribery and received an additional six-year term. Under Peruvian law all the sentences must run concurrently, with a maximum length of imprisonment of 25 years.

On 24 December 2017, President Pedro Pablo Kuczynski pardoned him on health grounds. The Peruvian Supreme Court overturned the pardon in October 2018, ruling that crimes against humanity are unpardonable. The Constitutional Court of Peru, in a 4–3 ruling on 17 March 2022, reinstated the pardon, though it was not clear if or when he may be released. On 8 April 2022, the Inter-American Court of Human Rights overruled the Constitutional Court and ordered Peru not to release Fujimori. On 5 December 2023, the Constitutional Court of Peru ordered the release of the former president from prison.

== Arrest in Chile ==
On 6 November 2005, Alberto Fujimori unexpectedly arrived in Santiago, Chile, on a private aircraft, having flown via Tijuana from Tokyo. His flight had passed through Peruvian airspace on its path from Mexico to Chile. There were numerous firings over alleged negligence in the handling of the Fujimori flight to Chile. As investigations continued, two Chilean and four Mexican immigration officers were dismissed for failing to notify superiors of Fujimori's stop at the time of his arrival. Colonel Carlos Medel, head of Interpol in Lima, was also fired for negligence, apparently having ordered his staff to switch off the 24-hour Interpol warning system at the time of the overflight.

Mexican officials suggested Fujimori was not arrested in Mexico because there was no judicial order for his arrest. Peruvian president Alejandro Toledo, after learning of the arrival of Fujimori in Chile, called for an "urgent meeting" in the governmental palace. Toledo called Chile's foreign minister, Ignacio Walker, and requested the detention of Fujimori. A few hours later, Fujimori was detained on an arrest warrant issued by a Chilean judge, who was told by Chile's Supreme Court to consider Lima's request for Fujimori's pre-trial detention, as part of the extradition process.

Fujimori was then transferred to the School of Investigations, Chile's Investigative Police academy, where he spent the night. Notified of the reasons for his arrest, Fujimori petitioned for provisional freedom during the extradition proceedings, but his petition was denied. Later in the day, he was transferred to the School of Gendarmerie, a training academy for corrections officers, where he was detained until May 2006.

== Extradition proceedings ==
The decision whether or not to extradite Fujimori was delegated by the Chilean government to the Supreme Court, following precedent dating to a 1932 extradition treaty between the two nations. Chilean law suggests that in addition to the terms of the treaty, extradition requests must also be based on whether there is sufficient evidence against the accused – not necessarily enough to convict him of the charges, but sufficient to justify (from a Chilean legal point of view) the indictments the accused faces. This meant that Peruvian prosecutors had to demonstrate that the crimes for which Fujimori has been charged in Peru were just as severe in Chile.

Peru, which had sixty days to issue an extradition request, sent a high-level delegation led by Interior Minister Rómulo Pizarro and a top prosecutor. The government of Japan asked for "fair treatment" for Fujimori.

On 18 May 2006 Fujimori was granted bail (set at US$2,830) by the Chilean Supreme Court and was released from detention and whisked away to a house rented for him by his family in the Las Condes neighborhood of Santiago. According to Fujii Takahiko, one of the Japanese financiers who had been covering some of Fujimori's expenses, "Fujimori [calmly waited] for the decision of the Chilean Supreme Court because he [had] the assurance that he [would] not be extradited." It was reported that Fujii covered the cost of renting the house, while a cadre of businessmen and Japanese friends covered his living expenses. Fujii, a car exporter by trade, reported that Fujimori had largely forgotten his knowledge of the Japanese language., Because he was granted provisional freedom, Fujimori was not allowed to leave Chile. There were fears among some Peruvians that he could have escaped from the country.

Fujimori arrived at a time of tense relations between Chile and Peru, after Peru's Congress passed a law the previous week in an attempt to reclaim sea territory from Chile. Chilean foreign minister, Ignacio Walker, said Fujimori's action demonstrated "a very imprudent, very irresponsible attitude, considering this is the most difficult week we have had with Peru in the last decade". In a media statement, Fujimori said that he would stay in Chile temporarily while launching his candidacy for Peruvian president in the April 2006 elections.

The government of Peru sent a number of extradition requests to Chile concerning Fujimori. It requested his extradition to stand trial for murder in the cases of the Barrios Altos massacre and the La Cantuta massacre, both carried out by Grupo Colina. It also requested his extradition for kidnapping Samuel Dyer and Gustavo Gorriti, both of whom were abducted by Peruvian Army personnel during Fujimori's self-coup and brought to the basements of the Intelligence Service.

Additionally, he was charged with usurpation of powers and abuse of authority for ordering the illegal search and seizure of a house owned by Vladimiro Montesinos' wife; illicit association to commit a crime, embezzlement, and inserting false statements in a public document for paying Montesinos US$15 million; illicit association to commit a crime and active corruption of authorities for paying congressmen to switch parties and inform on the opposition parties; telephonic interference or eavesdropping, illicit association to commit a crime, and embezzlement for authorizing the illegal wiretapping of opposition figure's phones; and illicit association to commit a crime, embezzlement, and usurpation of powers for engaging in a fraudulent purchase of tractors from China and bribing newspapers and television stations with state money in order to obtain favorable news coverage.

Subsequently, the Chilean judge overseeing the extradition proceedings refused to accept new evidence regarding the 10 corruption and two human rights charges, which, according to the BBC News' Dan Collyns, "would have prolonged the case by several months". On 22 November 2006, the Peruvian government issued a new arrest warrant for Fujimori, alleging that he ordered the death of 20 members of Sendero Luminoso in 1992. Fujimori denied the charge.

On 11 January 2007 Chile's Supreme Court rejected a motion for an additional investigation filed by lawyers representing Fujimori. The new ruling coincided with the Peruvian government's anger over a recent Inter-American Court of Human Rights (IACHR) ruling that found Peru guilty of crimes committed during former president's regime. The Peruvian government expressed fresh concern that Fujimori might try to escape from Chile. Although Fujimori was on parole, with stipulations banning him from leaving Chile, at the end of January 2007 he traveled to a beach resort aboard a private airplane.

On 1 February 2007 Reuters reported that the Peruvian government's final report on Fujimori's extradition included additional evidence supporting the former president's links to human rights abuses. In the words of Carlos Briceno, Peru's special corruption prosecutor, "We've practically finished the report, in which there is irrefutable proof [against Fujimori]". For his part, Fujimori denied the human rights and embezzlement charges.

== Pedro Fujimori ==
On 8 February 2007 the Peruvian government filed a formal request with the United States for the extradition of Fujimori's younger brother, Pedro Fujimori. According to the head of the Peruvian Justice Ministry's Unit for Extraditions, Omar Chehade, Pedro Fujimori was charged with corruption associated with reception of illegal donations for an NGO, Apenkai, founded at the outset of Fujimori's first term in office. Chehade reported to Reuters that Pedro Fujimori oversaw Japanese donations to the Peruvian government, and that he allegedly siphoned off as much as US$30 million into his own personal bank accounts in the United States. A spokesperson for the Fujimorista party, Congressman Carlos Raffo, denied the charges calling them unsubstantiated, and noted that there are no signs of corruption on the part of Pedro Fujimori.

== Chilean judge rejects Fujimori extradition ==
On 20 July 2007 the Chilean Supreme Court judge Orlando Álvarez, ruled that he had not found any evidence linking former president Alberto Fujimori with all the corruption cases and alleged human rights violations of which the Toledo congress had accused him. Judge Álvarez stated that all the accusations were based on hearsay; "he [Fujimori] was supposed to know those criminal acts".

The opinion was immediately appealed to the Supreme Court.

== Chilean Supreme Court grants Fujimori extradition ==
The Chilean Supreme Court granted Fujimori's extradition to Peru on 21 September 2007, on 7 of 13 charges. The Barrios Altos massacre and La Cantuta massacre related charges were accepted unanimously, while four other corruption-related charges were passed by a majority of votes. One corruption charge was passed unanimously.

On the same day, Peruvian police sent an airplane to receive Fujimori. The plane (with Peru's General Director of National Police, David Rodriguez, four Interpol officers and physicians) arrived in Santiago on the morning of 22 September. The following day, the plane returned to Lima's Las Palmas air force base with Fujimori on board. He was flown by helicopter to a police base, to be held in detention until a permanent facility was prepared.

== First conviction ==
Fujimori confessed that he had ordered a warrantless search of Vladimiro Montesinos's wife's apartment, and on 11 December 2007, the Peruvian court sentenced him to six years in prison and fined him 400,000 soles (135,000 U.S. dollars) for abuse of powers in ordering this search, which took place shortly before he left office.

On 10 April 2008, the Supreme Court of Peru upheld Fujimori's sentence of six years in the case.

== Peruvian general elections ==
Martha Chávez was Sí Cumple's presidential candidate in the April 9, 2006 general election (under the Alianza por el Futuro banner). Fujimori's daughter, Keiko Fujimori was a congressional candidate representing the same alliance. While Chávez got 7.43% of the first-round vote (placed 4th) for presidency and was eliminated, Keiko Fujimori received the highest vote for any single candidate (with 602,869 votes) and took one of Sí Cumple's 13 seats in the new Congress.

Some of Sí Cumple's members have occupied powerful positions in congress, such as Luisa María Cuculiza, who was first elected to Congress in 2006; Rolando Souza, who was formerly Alberto Fujimori's lawyer and later appointed to the Constitutional Court; and Santiago Fujimori, who was president of the Energy Committee. Keiko Fujimori, was president of the Peruvian-Chilean Friendship Commission. Keiko Fujimori was elected Peru's president in 2026.

== Japanese politics ==
In June 2007, Fujimori announced his candidacy for the House of Councillors, the upper house of the Diet of Japan, under the banner of the People's New Party, a minor party with only eight lawmakers. Still under house arrest in Chile at the time, Fujimori's initial campaign statements were conveyed by party head Shizuka Kamei. Japan's government had determined in 2000 that Fujimori holds Japanese citizenship. The Japanese Ministry of Internal Affairs and Communications issued a statement in response, pointing out that there is no law banning participation in an election by someone under house arrest in a foreign country.

The announcement sparked speculation that Fujimori's candidacy was a maneuver to win diplomatic immunity as an elected official and avoid trial in Peru. Chilean President Michelle Bachelet said her country's Supreme Court would not be influenced by the move and would soon decide whether to grant an extradition request to return Fujimori to Peru.

On 11 July 2007, Chile's Supreme Court turned down the Peruvian government's request that Fujimori be extradited there to face charges of human rights violations; however he remained under house arrest in Chile and it was unclear whether he would be permitted to depart for Japan. Though much of the Japanese public have a favorable view of Fujimori due to his role in the resolution of the 1997 Japanese embassy hostage crisis, members of the Democratic Party of Japan and the Japanese Communist Party questioned his commitment to Japan and accused him of using the election to avoid justice in Peru.

Japan indicated on 5 July 2007 that it had no plans to ask Chile to allow Alberto Fujimori to return for that month's upper house elections. The leader of the People's New Party had urged Japan's Foreign Minister to take up the issue with the government of Chile. Fujimori ultimately lost the election.

== Conviction for human rights abuses ==
On 7 April 2009, a three-judge panel of Peru's Supreme Court convicted Fujimori on charges of human rights abuses, declaring that the "charges against him have been proven beyond all reasonable doubt". The panel found him guilty of ordering the Grupo Colina death squad to execute the November 1991 Barrios Altos massacre and the July 1992 La Cantuta massacre, which resulted in the deaths of 25 people, and for taking part in the kidnappings of Peruvian journalist Gustavo Gorriti and businessman Samuel Dyer. Fujimori's conviction marked the first time in history that a democratically elected president had been tried and found guilty of human rights abuses in his own country. Fujimori was already serving a six-year prison sentence for his December 2007 conviction on abuse of power charges. The trial for Fujimori's human rights abuses lasted 15 months, and was postponed on multiple occasions due to his ill health. Later on 7 April, the court sentenced Fujimori to 25 years in prison.

Ronald Gamarra Herrera, Executive Secretary of National Coordinator for Human Rights of Peru and one of the lawyers representing the civil parties –the families of the Barrios Altos and La Cantuta victims– said to the press that "there has not been hate, or revenge, or cruelty in Fujimori's trial. What there has been is justice. We are not happy for the pain of a man, nor of what tragedy his family is going through. But yes it is comforting to know that justice has been served and that the victims, after so many years, can rest in peace".

The Financial Times claimed that international observers had "hailed the trial as a model of due process even before the verdict was read out". Michael Reed of the International Center for Transitional Justice stated that, "Throughout 15 months the whole Peruvian people have been actively living this process. This social engagement is important ... the decision will in fact demonstrate polarisation. The issue is how the Peruvian state and Peruvian society deal with that polarization towards the future." Maria McFarland, a Senior Researcher for Human Rights Watch, noted that the verdict was "absolutely the right decision ... [and] well grounded in all the evidence" and that the special court would "go down in history as a model of what we want to see in terms of rule of law and justice and progress in Latin America. So much has always been focused on the power of the executive and the president and the strong man; now suddenly the judiciary is having a say."

After Fujimori's conviction had been announced, riots broke out in the streets. In the Ate District, approximately twenty police officers had to break up a fight between members of Fujimori's political party and a group from the local Peru's Workers Confederation (CTP). It was believed that the riot broke out when about fifty CTP members went to the police station and provoked a fight with some 300 Fujimori supporters. Outside the court, relatives of victims clashed with Fujimori supporters; the fights were broken up by riot police.

Correo, a right-wing newspaper in Lima, published a poll on 9 April claiming that 59.4% was against Fujimori's conviction, with rejection of the sentence reaching 68.3% among the lower classes. Nevertheless, the poll doesn't clarify if those interviewed considered Fujimori innocent or if they considered him guilty but did't approve of the sentence itself.
