= Ricardo Uceda =

Peruvian journalist

- Born: July 27, 1954 (age 72); Chiclayo, Peru
- Occupation: journalist
- Known for: reporting on government corruption, La Cantuta Massacre
- Awards: International Press Freedom Award (1993); International Press Institute (2000); Maria Moors Cabot prize (2000)

Ricardo Uceda Pérez (born July 27, 1954) is a Peruvian journalist notable for his award-winning coverage of military and government corruption.

== Background ==
Uceda was born in Chiclayo, Peru in 1954. He studied journalism at the Jaime Bausate y Mesa Institute of Journalism in Lima and economics and journalism at the National University of San Marcos. He worked for the magazine El Mundo in 1974, then served short stints with the daily newspapers Expreso, El Diario, and El Nacional. In 1987 he worked as an investigative reporter at the television station Canal 2 before becoming deputy director of the magazine Sí the following year.

== Anti-corruption journalism ==
During his tenure at Sí, Uceda published reports on the corruption of government officials, exposing army massacres and collaboration with drug lords. He consistently refused to reveal the sources of his investigations, leading to numerous government cases against him. He was also accused by government spokespeople of being connected with the Shining Path, though these charges were never substantiated. In 1992, Sí ran a story implicating senior military officials in the Barrios Altos massacre, an incident in which the anti-communist death squad Grupo Colina killed fifteen partygoers, including an eight-year-old child, after mistaking them for Shining Path members. Following the story, Uceda was the subject of a police investigation for "falsifying information", a charge of which he was later cleared. An Americas Watch (an arm of Human Rights Watch) spokesperson condemned the investigation as being part of a general pattern of repression against journalists by the government of Alberto Fujimori.

In one high-profile case in 1993, members of a dissatisfied army faction directed Uceda to a mass grave containing the corpses of nine students and one professor kidnapped from La Cantuta University. Ten army officers and soldiers were eventually charged with the crime, which became known as the La Cantuta Massacre. When angry officials accused Uceda of obstructing justice in response to his reporting—a crime punishable by a prison term—the Peruvian Congress held a vote to guarantee his safety. Complicity in this massacre became one of the charges for which then-president Alberto Fujimori was subsequently tried and found guilty by a panel of three Peruvian judges.

In 1994, Ricardo Uceda resigned as editor-in-chief of Sí to form a special investigative team at El Comercio, then Peru's most popular daily newspaper. As with Uceda's Sí reporting, the Comercio team focused on cases of governmental corruption. One of the team's most notable successes came in 1998, when they exposed the misuse of state funds intended for the survivors of El Niño-created floods and mudslides; the story resulted in the arrest and imprisonment of Civil Defence Chief General Homero Nureña.

In 2004, he published the book Muerte en el Pentagonito: Los cementerios secretos del Ejército Peruano, which explored individual cases in the long conflict between the Shining Path and the Peruvian Army.

== Awards and recognition ==
Uceda was awarded a 1993 International Press Freedom Award of the Committee to Protect Journalists in recognition of his reporting on both the La Cantuta and Barrios Altos massacres.

In 2000, the International Press Institute selected him as one of 50 World Press Freedom Heroes of the past half-century. His book Muerte en el Pentagonito: Los cementerios secretos del Ejército Peruano was shortlisted for the Lettre Ulysses Award for the Art of Reportage in 2005, losing to Scribbling the Cat: Travels with an African Soldier by UK author Alexandra Fuller. In the same year, he won the Maria Moors Cabot prize of Columbia University, the oldest international award in the field of journalism.
