= Cantuta (disambiguation) =

Cantuta may refer to:

- Cantuta, a flower
- National University of Education Enrique Guzmán y Valle, often called "La Cantuta"
- La Cantuta massacre, the killings of a professor and nine students in Peru
