= National Directorate of Strategic Intelligence =

Defunct intelligence agency of Peru

- Dirección Nacional de Inteligencia Estratégica; DINIE

Agency overview
- Formed: June 5, 2001
- Preceding agency: SIN
- Dissolved: January 4, 2006
- Superseding agency: DINI
- Jurisdiction: Peru
- Headquarters: Lima

The National Directorate of Strategic Intelligence (Spanish: Dirección Nacional de Inteligencia Estratégica, DINIE), was the intelligence agency of Peru after the dissolution of the National Intelligence Service in 2001 and the creation of the National Directorate of Intelligence in 2006.

== History ==
In November 2000, when it was discovered that the then intelligence advisor Vladimiro Montesinos paid bribes to important political and military figures, Law No. 27351 was issued, through which the National Intelligence Service (SIN) was deactivated, functioning until 2001.

As a consequence of the SIN's deactivation, Law No. 27479 of June 5, 2001 was issued, which created in its replacement the National Intelligence Council (Spanish: Consejo Nacional de Inteligencia, CNI) and the National Directorate of Strategic Intelligence (DINIE).

Later, these organisations were also dissolved with the passing of Law No. 28664, which gave birth to the National Directorate of Intelligence.

== See also ==
- National Directorate of Intelligence (Peru)
