= Julio Salazar =

Peruvian intelligence officer (1935–2024)

Julio Salazar Monroe
- Born: 11 February 1935; Lima, Peru
- Died: 8 May 2024 (aged 89); Lima, Peru
- Military career
- Allegiance: Peru
- Branch: Peruvian Army
- Rank: General
- Commands: National Intelligence Service
- Conflicts: Internal Conflict in Peru, La Cantuta Massacre
- Other work: Imprisoned for his role in the La Cantuta Massacre

General Julio Ronald Salazar Monroe (11 February 1935 – 8 May 2024) was a Peruvian military and intelligence officer who was the de jure chief of Peru's National Intelligence Service (SIN) during the early 1990s. During Salazar's tenure at the SIN, Vladimiro Montesinos acted as the de facto chief of the SIN and National Security Advisor.

On 8 April 2008, Salazar was sentenced to 35 years in prison for his role in the La Cantuta Massacre, which was carried out by the Grupo Colina death squad. While still serving this sentence at Callao Naval Base (which also functions as a maximum-security prison), Salazar died on 8 May 2024, at the age of 89, while being treated for various illnesses, including cancer, at the Central Military Hospital in Lima.
