= Barrios Altos (disambiguation) =

Barrios Altos may refer to:

- Bairro Alto, a neighbourhood of Lisbon, Portugal
- Barrios Altos, a neighbourhood of Lima, Peru
  - Barrios Altos massacre, which took place in 1991
- Barrio Alto, a neighbourhood of Elche, Spain
