= Pardon of Alberto Fujimori =

2017–2023 Peruvian legal and political saga

- Part of Peruvian political crisis
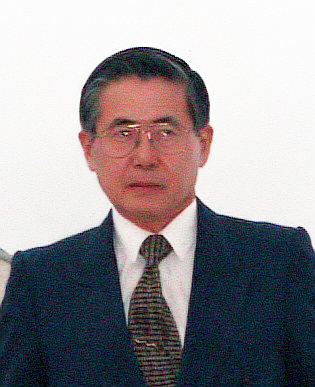
- Alberto Fujimori in October 1998
- Date: 24 December 2017
- Location: Peru
- Type: Pardon
- Convicted: Alberto Fujimori
- Convictions: Human rights abuses, murder and kidnapping
- Sentence: 25 years

On 24 December 2017, the President of Peru, Pedro Pablo Kuczynski, pardoned jailed ex-president Alberto Fujimori. Because the pardon was granted on Christmas Eve, it became known as the "indulto de Navidad" ("Christmas pardon").

In 2009, Fujimori had been convicted of human rights violations and sentenced to 25 years in prison for his role in killings and kidnappings by the Grupo Colina death squad during his government's battle against Shining Path leftist guerrillas in the 1990s. The verdict marked the first time that an elected head of state has been extradited to his home country, tried, and convicted of human rights violations. Fujimori was specifically found guilty of murder, bodily harm, and two cases of kidnapping. The pardon was granted after Fujimori had completed 10 years of imprisonment in Lima.

The pardon sparked massive protests across Peru, even during Christmas Eve and Christmas Day celebrations, which are holidays in the country. Protestors accused Kuczynski of corruption, claiming that the pardon was a reward for the support of Fujimori's son, Kenji Fujimori, which had been central to Kuczynski's success in surviving an impeachment vote days earlier.

On 3 October 2018, Fujimori's pardon was reversed by the Supreme Court of Peru and he was ordered to return to prison. He was rushed to a hospital and entered prison on 23 January 2019. The Constitutional Court of Peru, in a 4–3 ruling on 17 March 2022, reinstated the pardon, although it was not clear if or when he may be released. On 8 April 2022, the Inter-American Court of Human Rights overruled the Constitutional Court and ordered Peru not to release Fujimori. On 5 December 2023, the Constitutional Court of Peru ordered the release of the former president from prison.

== Background ==
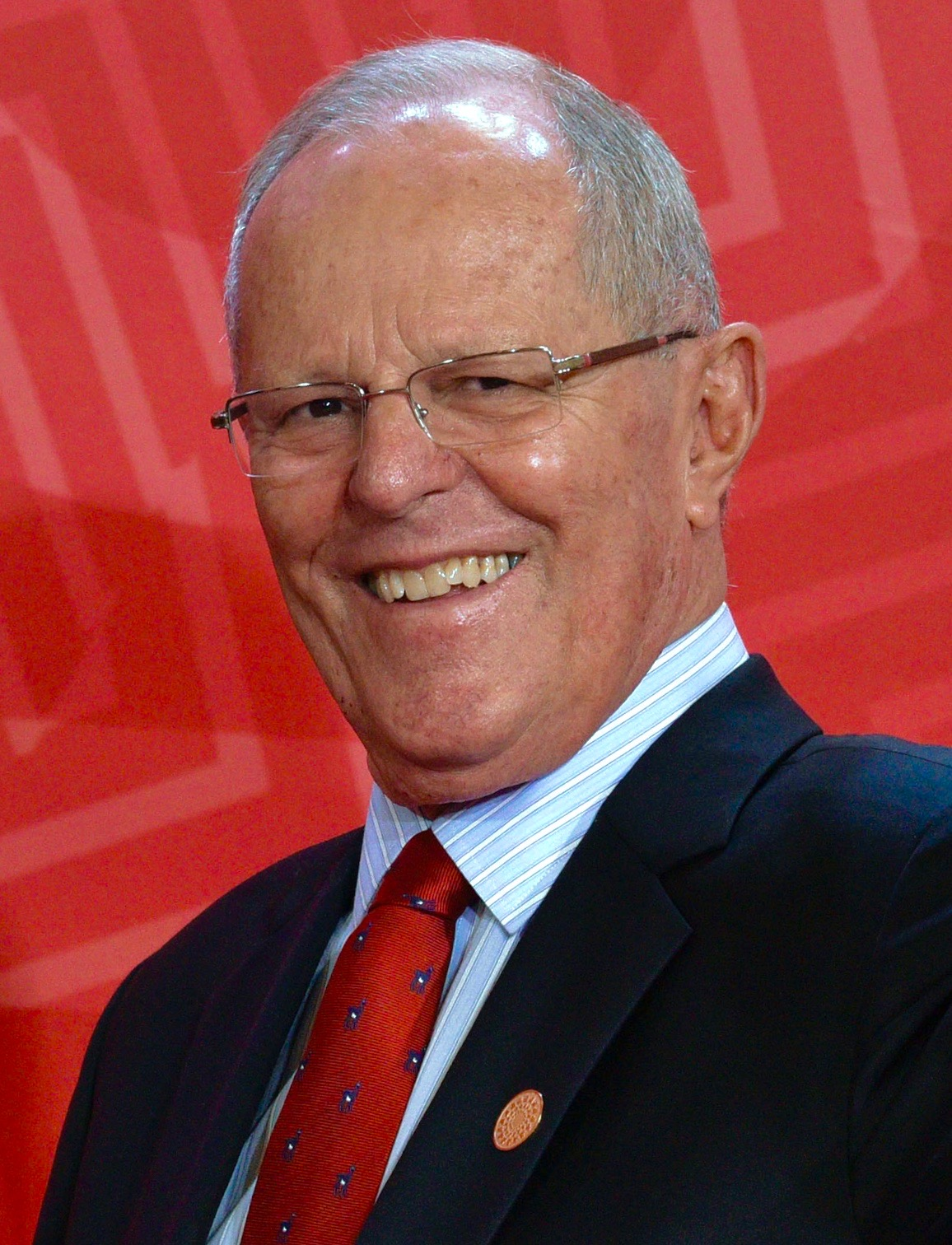
President Pedro Pablo Kuczynski

=== Legal situation ===
According to Peruvian law, the president has the power to grant a humanitarian pardon when the condemned person presents a terminal illness; an advanced, incurable, degenerative illness where prison conditions put the person's life, health, or integrity at risk; or a chronic, degenerative, mental illness where prison conditions put the person's life, health or integrity at risk.

=== Fujimori's criminal trial and convictions ===
Alberto Fujimori was President of Peru between 1990 and 2000 in the period of the so-called Fujimorato. While still president, Fujimori fled the country and took refuge in Japan when faced with charges of corruption in 2000. On arriving in Japan he attempted to resign his presidency via fax, but his resignation was rejected by the Congress of the Republic, which removed him from office by the process of impeachment. Wanted in Peru on charges of corruption and human rights abuses, Fujimori maintained a self-imposed exile until his arrest while visiting Chile in November 2005. He was extradited to face criminal charges in Peru in September 2007. In 2009, he was sentenced to 25 years for homicide for ordering the Barrios Altos and La Cantuta massacres. He was also sentenced for other crimes including corruption.

Other accusations against Fujimori include the mass sterilization of 231,774 indigenous people in rural Peru as a result of the National Population Program.

=== Previous pardon request ===
Press reports in late 2012 indicated that Fujimori was suffering from tongue cancer and other medical problems. His family petitioned then-president Ollanta Humala for a pardon. President Humala rejected a pardon in June 2013, saying that Fujimori's condition was not serious enough to warrant it. In July 2016, with three days left in his term, President Humala said that there was insufficient time to evaluate a second request to pardon Fujimori, leaving the decision to his successor Pedro Pablo Kuczynski.

=== Impeachment of Pedro Pablo Kuczynski ===
In December 2017, Kuczynski faced impeachment proceedings for his connection to the international corruption scandal surrounding the Brazilian firm Odebrecht. The impeachment request was presented by left-wing party Broad Front (headed by former priest and environmental activist Marco Arana). Fujimori's daughter Keiko was the most outspoken supporter of the impeachment proceedings against Kuczynski, who had defeated her the year before in a tightly contested presidential election. Kuczynski survived the impeachment vote on 21 December, largely due to the support of Fujimori's son Kenji.

== Pardon ==
On 11 December 2017, Fujimori requested a pardon for humanitarian reasons. A medical board composed of Juan Postigo, Víctor Sánchez and Guido Hernández recommended pardoning the former president due to a "progressive, degenerative and incurable disease". On 23 December, Fujimori was transferred from the Diroes prison to a clinic. On 24 December, the Press Office of the Presidential Office announced the pardon of Fujimori through a press release.

An official medical board has evaluated the inmate and has determined that Mr. Fujimori suffers from a progressive, degenerative and incurable disease and that prison conditions pose a serious risk to his life, health and integrity. ... The President of the Republic, in using the powers conferred by the political Constitution of Peru for such purposes, has decided to grant a humanitarian pardon to Mr. Alberto Fujimori and seven others who are in similar condition at 18:00 hours on 24 December 2017.

— Press Office of the Presidential Office

The same day, Kuczynski signed R.S. No. 281-2017-JUS., granting Fujimori "pardon and right of grace for humanitarian reasons within the Barbadillo Penitentiary Establishment".

== Reactions ==
On 25 December, in the face of protests against the pardon, Kuczysnki released a message to the nation, asking people to not "get carried away by hate" nor to allow the former president to "die in prison". In a video broadcast on his social media, Fujimori apologized to those who were "defrauded by [his] government" and thanked Kuczynski.

There was widespread criticism in Peru that the pardon was motivated less by clemency than a desire to reward Fujimori's son Kenji for his role in helping Kuczynski survive the impeachment vote against him the week before the pardon. Thousands of protesters took to the streets in Lima on 26 December. The Peruvian non-profit law office Legal Defense Institute denounced the pardon as political and illegal and vowed to appeal it to the Inter-American Court of Human Rights (IACHR). The Peruvian human rights organization Association for Human Rights (APRODEH) and the international organization Center for Justice and International Law (CEJIL) released a statement on 27 December asking the IACHR to intervene.

Amerigo Incalcaterra, the South America representative for the United Nations High Commissioner for Human Rights, categorically rejected the pardon, stating that "Not putting victims at the center of this decision derails the progress the Peruvian state has made on truth, justice, memory and reparations".

Before the pardon was announced, Human Rights Watch had condemned the possibility of a pardon, calling it "a slap in the face to victims of atrocities in Peru and a major setback for the rule of law in the country"; and Amnesty International said that the pardon would violate Peru's obligations under international law and undermine the fight against impunity.

The days following the pardon saw the resignation of various members of Kuczynski's Peruvians for Change party, including the Minister of Culture, three members of Congress, and eight appointed officials. Facing a second impeachment process, Kuczynski himself resigned in March 2018.

== Reversal of pardon ==
Following appeals by victims of Fujimori's decisions, Peru's Supreme Court reversed his pardon on 3 October 2018. Fujimori was ordered back to prison. The court found that the pardon lacked legal foundation, as one of the reasons given for Fujimori's pardon was a terminal illness, but he did not suffer from one. Furthermore, it found that "the pardon was unlawful because Fujimori's crimes are considered crimes against humanity, and therefore can't be pardoned under Peruvian and international law". Fujimori's attorney said he would appeal the decision.

On the day the reversal was announced, Fujimori was transported by ambulance to a private clinic to be treated for a heart condition. He gave an interview there one day later, saying that a return to prison would kill him.

Days later, on 11 October 2018, the Congress of Peru—whose members are mainly Fujimorist—approved a bill allowing older adults to be released from prison and be placed on electronic monitoring, a move that was seen as benefiting Fujimori.

In January 2019, a court-appointed panel found that Fujimori was healthy enough to return to prison, and he was forced back to prison on 23 January 2019. The Supreme Court rejected an appeal by Fujimori's lawyers on 13 February 2019, confirming the earlier decision that Fujimori must serve the remaining 13 years of his sentence in prison.

The Constitutional Court of Peru, in a 4–3 ruling on 17 March 2022, reinstated the pardon, though it was not clear if or when he may be released. On 8 April 2022, the Inter-American Court of Human Rights overruled the Constitutional Court and ordered Peru not to release Fujimori.

== Later events ==
Fujimori's daughter, Keiko Fujimori, unsuccessfully ran for president in the 2021 Peruvian general election. She had announced in January 2021 that she would pardon her father should she get elected. She ultimately lost the election in the second round to Pedro Castillo, who has vowed to not consider pardoning Fujimori while in office.

On 5 December 2023, the Constitutional Court of Peru ordered the immediate release of Alberto Fujimori. He passed away on 11 September 2024.

== See also ==
- 2017–2021 Peruvian political crisis
