= National Institute of Civil Defence =

Government agency in Peru

- Instituto Nacional de Defensa Civil
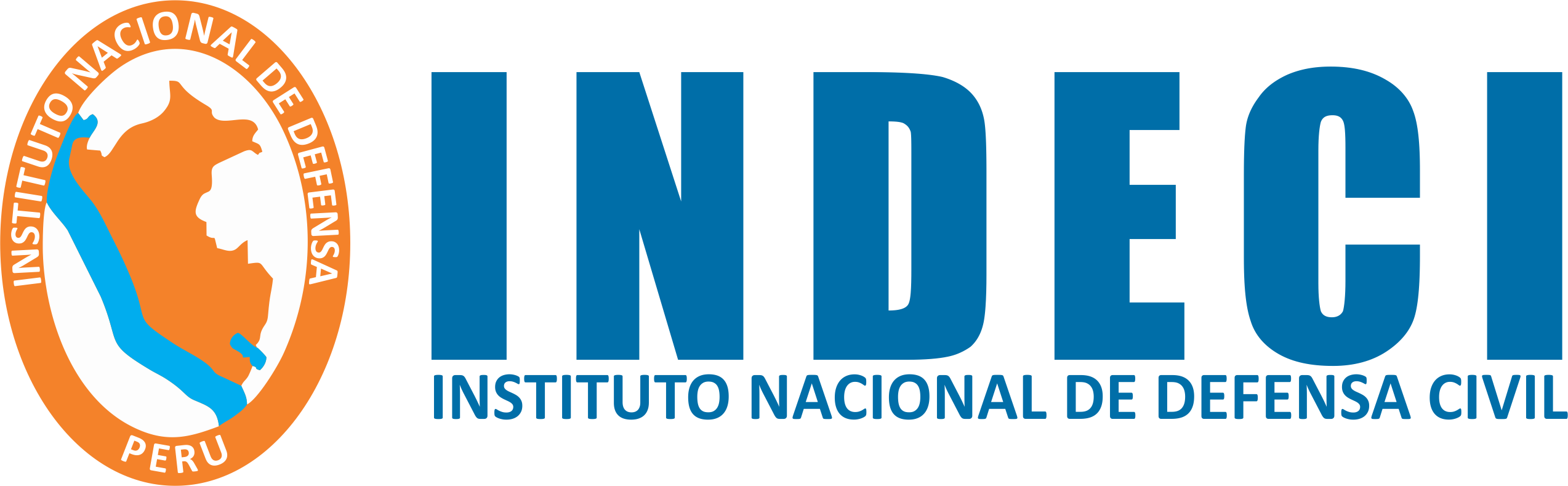

Agency overview
- Formed: September 27, 1987 (Note: Created on March 29, 1972, as SINADECI.)
- Preceding agency: Sinadeci
- Jurisdiction: Peru
- Headquarters: Lima
- Motto: Everyone's task (Note: Spanish: Defensa Civil, tarea de todos)
- Agency executive: Carlos Manuel Yáñez Lazo, Chief (interim)
- Parent Ministry: Ministry of Defence
- Website: www.gob.pe/indeci

The National Institute of Civil Defence (Spanish: Instituto Nacional de Defensa Civil, INDECI), created in 1972 as the National System of Civil Defence (Spanish: Sistema Nacional de Defensa Civil, SINADECI), is a public organisation dependent on the Ministry of Defence of Peru.

== History ==
It was created by the Revolutionary Government of the Armed Forces of Peru on March 29, 1972, through Decree Law No. 19338, it was initially known as the National Civil Defense System (Sinadeci). The creation of this organization was a direct response to the devastating Ancash earthquake of 1970. On September 27, 1987, it was formally created under its current name.

In 1998, the investigative team of journalist Ricardo Uceda, who had resigned as editor-in-chief of Sí to form a special investigative team at El Comercio in 1994, exposed the misuse of state funds intended for the survivors of floods and mudslides induced by the 1997-98 El Niño event as part of their investigations focused on cases of governmental corruption. The story resulted in the arrest and imprisonment of Civil Defence Chief General Homero Nureña.

Article 13 of Law No. 29664 defines Indeci as a public executing entity with budgetary authority. Its main responsibility is to coordinate, facilitate and supervise the formulation and implementation of the National Policy and the National Disaster Risk Management Plan. This includes the preparation, response and rehabilitation processes. Under the same law, Indeci is divided into four components of prospective work: estimation, prevention, reduction and reconstruction. In addition, the National Centre for Disaster Risk Estimation, Prevention and Reduction (CENEPRED) was created. However, the creation of Cenepred has sparked some controversies and raised doubts about its effectiveness. Despite these controversies, Indeci continues to play a vital role in disaster risk management in Peru, working closely with regional and local governments to assess damage and needs in the aftermath of disasters.

== See also ==
- Ministry of Defence (Peru)
