= No to Keiko =

Peruvian social collective

No a Keiko
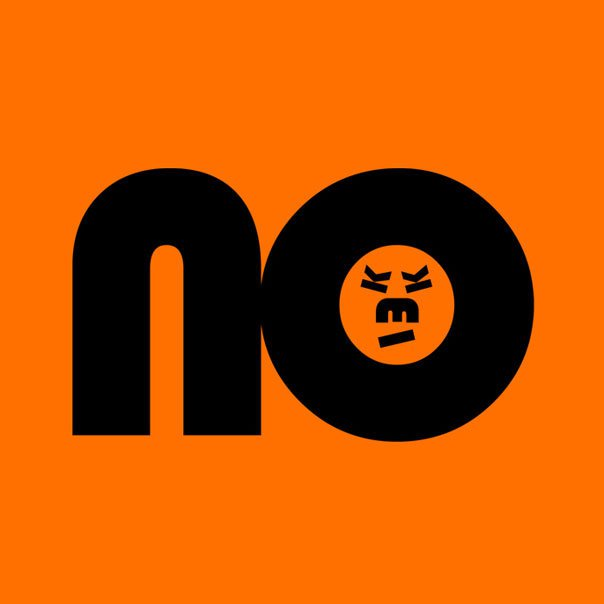
- Founded: May 2009
- Founded at: Peru
- Type: Social movement
- Website: noakeiko.com

No to Keiko (Spanish: No a Keiko) is a Peruvian non-profit social movement with the objectives of "[making] sure the [Peruvian] population is aware that Keiko [Fujimori] is not a political alternative that can successfully maintain the sustained development of the country," and "defeating the undemocratic establishment of Fujimorism."

It was founded in May 2009 by the UL's students Giancarlo Navarro and Patricia Zevallos in Cajamarca. It is a prominent voice in the anti-Fujimorist movement.

== Influence ==
This group has participated in various marches against the candidacy or in favor of the cancellation of the candidacy of the Peruvian politician Keiko Fujimori. They led two major marches against the Fuerza Popular (Fujimori's party) - the Gran Marcha Nacional: Keiko No Va! (Grand National March: Keiko will not go) that was held in Plaza San Martín, Lima, requesting a ban against Fujimori's candidacy in the 2016 presidential election, and the Marcha por la democracia: Keiko no Va! (March for Democracy: Keiko will not go) against Fujimori's candidacy and involved between 30 and 60 thousand peaceful protesters. On 31 May 2016, the slogan "No es odio, es amor al Perú" (No hate, only love for Peru) was shared widely on social media, strongly shifting the undecided vote towards Pedro Pablo Kuczynski instead of Fujimori. In November 2019, along with a large march against Fujimori and a social media campaign, the group campaigned for her to be brought in front of the courts for illegal activity as a writ of habeas corpus. During the 2021 Peruvian general election, No a Keiko organized several nationwide marches in opposition to Fujimori's accession to the second round of the presidential election. Marches in Lima, Cusco, Puno, Junín and in the south of Peru were held to rally support against Fujimori. Fujimori was later elected the country's president in 2026.

== Reaction ==
Fujimori has many times attacked the movement in press conferences and interviews, as well as alleging that the movement had ties to former President Ollanta Humala and his wife, Nadine Heredia. Fujimori and her allies have also characterized the movement as "hate speech," as opposed to a legitimate opposition against her political views.
