= National Intelligence Service (Peru) =

Defunct intelligence agency of Peru

- Servicio de Inteligencia Nacional

Agency overview
- Formed: 1960
- Dissolved: 2001
- Superseding agency: DINI
- Jurisdiction: Government of Peru
- Headquarters: Lima, Peru
- Employees: 2,300 (2000)
- Annual budget: $96-108 million (2000)
- Parent agency: Independent

The National Intelligence Service (Spanish: Servicio de Inteligencia Nacional or SIN) was an intelligence agency of the Government of Peru that existed from 1960 to 2001. It was headquartered at the Quiñones Building, the headquarters of the country's Defence Ministry. It also acted as the government's de facto secret police.

== History ==
On January 26, 1961, President Manuel Prado Ugarteche created the National Intelligence Service (SIN) by Supreme Decree in a stage characterised by the triumph of the Cuban revolution, the phenomenon of unconventional war, and the process of recent modernisation carried out by the Peruvian Army. This was important in the Latin American cultural Cold War.

During the government of Juan Velasco Alvarado, the SIN was related to the KGB, the intelligence agency of the Soviet Union. Negotiations were held between the SIN and the KGB for the training of agents, exchange of intelligence and cooperation in security measures. The KGB assigned two operations officers and a technical specialist as liaison points with the SIN in Lima. With the support of the SIN, the KGB carried out actions in Peru against the CIA and against the embassies of Mexico, the United States and Chile present in the Peruvian capital. In addition, joint operations were carried out in Chile, Argentina and other Latin American countries.

Years later, the regulations of the SIN in Peru would be modernised only in 1984, during the government of President Fernando Belaúnde, under the always inconvenient modality of delegated legislation, that is, through Legislative Decrees No. 270 and 271. Both constitute the first real attempt to institutionalise Peruvian intelligence, creating and designing for such purposes the Superior Intelligence Council (Spanish: Consejo Superior de Inteligencia, CSI), a collegiate entity for decision-making of the intelligence system and to promote its specialisation.

=== Fujimori government ===
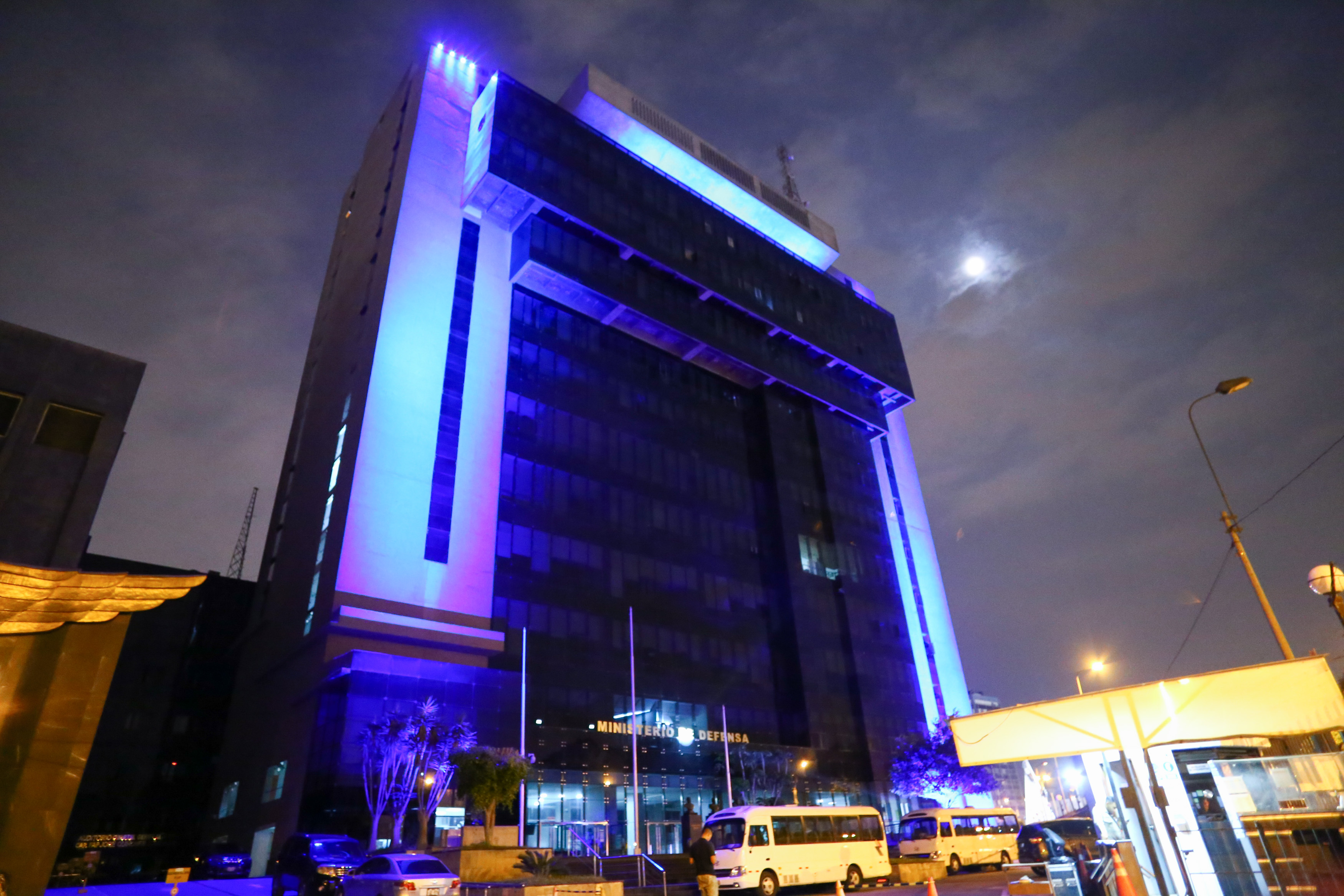
Quiñones Building, where the agency was headquartered.

In July 1992, the Government of Emergency and National Reconstruction of Alberto Fujimori promulgated Decree Law No. 25635, which specified that the National Intelligence Service (SINA) was the central and governing body of the National Intelligence System, it had a ministerial rank, depended on the President of the Republic and is responsible for producing, integrating, directing, coordinating, controlling and carrying out intelligence and counterintelligence activities required by National Security and Defence.

During Fujimori's administration, the agency's power expanded, and its de facto chief, Vladimiro Montesinos, used the agency for political purposes. Funding for the agency was not supervised by Congress; SIN's budget grew fifty times larger between 1990 and 2000, with the budget being between $96 million and $108 million in the latter year. In 2000, La República reported that around 2,300 people were agents of the organisation. Montesinos used the agency to gather and control all information within Peru. Wiretapping was common by SIN agents under Montesinos. Surveillance cameras were placed at the Legislative Palace, the Palace of Justice, the Government Palace, Jorge Chávez International Airport, at brothels visited by politicians and in other locations throughout Lima, all being personally reviewed by Montesinos.

Under Montesinos, the agency was surrounded by a halo of mystery, as it was considered the main body responsible for cases of torture, murders, kidnappings and acts of repression against opponents of Fujimori's government. Former employees of the headquarters of the Peruvian Army, known locally as "The little Pentagon", reported that a sub-basement existed where political opponents were imprisoned, tortured and killed. According to them, those killed were cremated in an incinerator and a smell of burnt hair was present within the facility. By 1998, the group was alleged to be related to the Colina Group. For that, 45 days were offered to proceed with the complete deactivation by Marcial Rubio.

The service was deactivated by President Alberto Fujimori in October 2000, under pressure from the Organization of American States. This was after Montesinos was discovered paying bribes to important figures in politics, the arts and the military. These activities were financed with public resources and apparently with other types of sources of dubious origin. For this reason, and due to the scandalous budget irregularities, the General Comptroller's Office carried out a control action, the result of which has been used by the Judiciary in almost all processes that are linked to the SIN's budget management. After its deactivation, the service continued to be limitedly operated in 2001 by a decree law that financed it. Law No. 27479 of June 5 ultimately created the National Intelligence Council (Spanish: Consejo Nacional de Inteligencia, CNI) and the National Directorate of Strategic Intelligence (Spanish: Dirección Nacional de Inteligencia Estratégica, DINIE), themselves dissolved through Law No. 28664, which created the National Intelligence System (Spanish: Sistema de Inteligencia Nacional, SINA) and the National Directorate of Intelligence (Spanish: Dirección Nacional de Inteligencia, DINI).

== Chiefs ==
The following list does not include Vladimiro Montesinos, de facto leader from 1990 to 2000.

- Eduardo Segura Gutiérrez
- Rudecindo Zavaleta Rivera
- Rafael Hoyos Rubio (1976)
- Juan Schroth Carlín (1976–1978)
- Mario Villavicencio Alcázar (1980–1981)
- Ludwig Essenwanger Sánchez (1981–1982)
- Juan Bergelund Remy
- Eduardo Colunge Guevara
- Javier Ernesto Rocha Mujica (-1985)
- Julio Velásquez Giacarini (1985–1986)
- Edwin Díaz Zevallos (1986–1991)
- Julio Salazar Monroe (1991–1998)
- Humberto Rozas Bonuccelli (1998–2000)
- Luis Rodríguez Silva (2000–2001)

== See also ==
- Peruvian conflict
