= Sí (Peruvian magazine) =

Peruvian news magazine

Sí is a Peruvian news magazine which was established in 1986. The magazine has its headquarters in Lima. It is published on a weekly basis and features articles on political news. In 1993, its editor Ricardo Uceda was instrumental in exposing the La Cantuta Massacre, an incident in which nine students and one professor from La Cantuta University were executed by army soldiers and buried in a mass grave.
