= Orlando Álvarez (lawyer) =

Orlando Antonio Álvarez Hernández (3 January 1935 − 8 December 2013) was a Chilean lawyer, writer, music critic and university professor.

Born in Ovalle, Álvarez was the minister of the Supreme Court of Chile from 1998 to 2009 and chairman of the Electoral Court from 2008 to his death in 2013.

Orlando Álvarez died on 8 December 2013, aged 78.
