= Pedro Huilca Tecse =

Peruvian trade unionist (1949–1992)

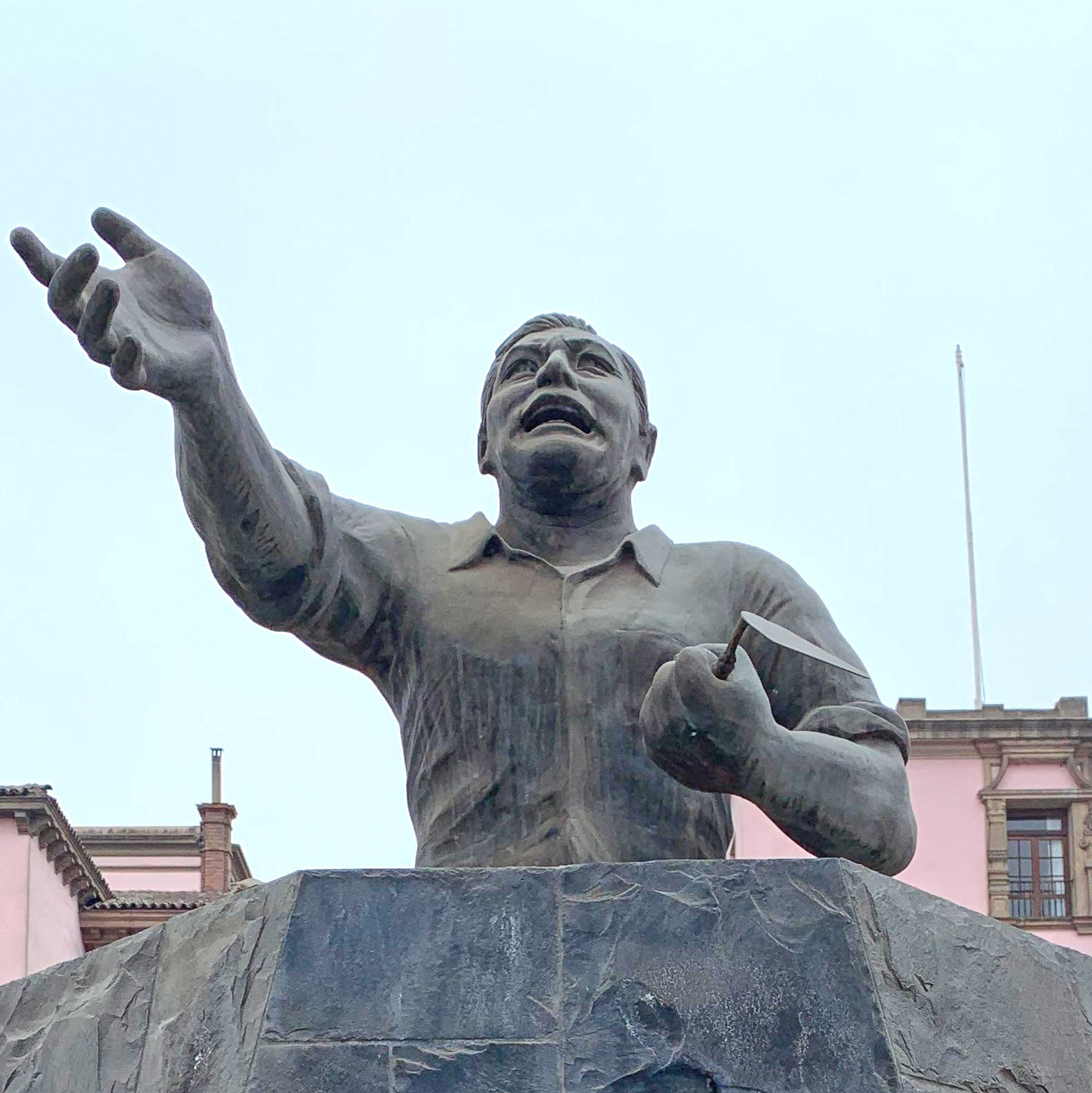
Statue of Huilca

Pedro Huilca Tecse (1949-1992) was a Peruvian union leader. He led the Peruvian Civil Construction Workers' Federation for 12 years. He was killed by Grupo Colina in 1992. Huilca's murder is discussed in the final report of the Peruvian Truth and Reconciliation Commission.
