= National Directorate of Intelligence (Peru) =

Peru intelligence agency

- Dirección Nacional de Inteligencia; DINI

Agency overview
- Formed: January 4, 2006
- Preceding agency: SIN
- Headquarters: Lima, Peru
- Agency executive: Manuel Humberto Del Aguila Sana, Director
- Website: www.gob.pe/dini

The National Directorate of Intelligence (Spanish: Dirección Nacional de Inteligencia), or (DINI), is the premier intelligence agency in Peru. The agency is responsible for national, military and police intelligence, as well as counterintelligence.

== History ==
On 27 January 1960, the National Intelligence Service (SIN) was established. Following the presidency of Alberto Fujimori and controversies surrounding SIN, the agency was "deactivated" in November 2000. Under the regulation of Supreme Decree Nº 025-2006-PCM of 4 January 2006, the National Directorate of Intelligence (DINI) was established.

== Chiefs ==
=== National Council of Intelligence ===
- Juan Manuel Campos Luque (2001)
- Alfonso Panizo Zariquiey (2001–2002)
- Juan Velit Granda (2002)
- Fernando Rospigliosi (2002–2003)
- César Almeyda Tasayco (2003)
- Alfonso Panizo Zariquiey (2003)
- Daniel Mora Zevallos (2003–2004)
- Ricardo Arboccó Liceti (2004)
- Julio Raygada García (2004–2006)

=== National Directorate of Intelligence ===
- Héctor Beltrán Lora (2006–2009)
- Danilo Guevara Zegarra (2009–2011)
- Víctor Manuel Gómez Rodríguez (2011–2015)
- Javier Briceño Carpio (2015)
- Manuel Álvaro Sevilla Echevarría (2015–2016)
- Guillermo Fajardo Cama (2016–2018)
- Carlos Illanes Calderón (2018–2021)
- Hugo Antonio Cornejo Valdivia (2021–2021)
- José Luis Fernández Latorre (2021)
- Wilson Fredy Barrantes Mendoza (2021–2022)
- Juan Carlos Liendo O'Connor (2022)

== See also ==
- National Intelligence Service (Peru)
