= Carlos Raffo =

Peruvian politician (born 1967)

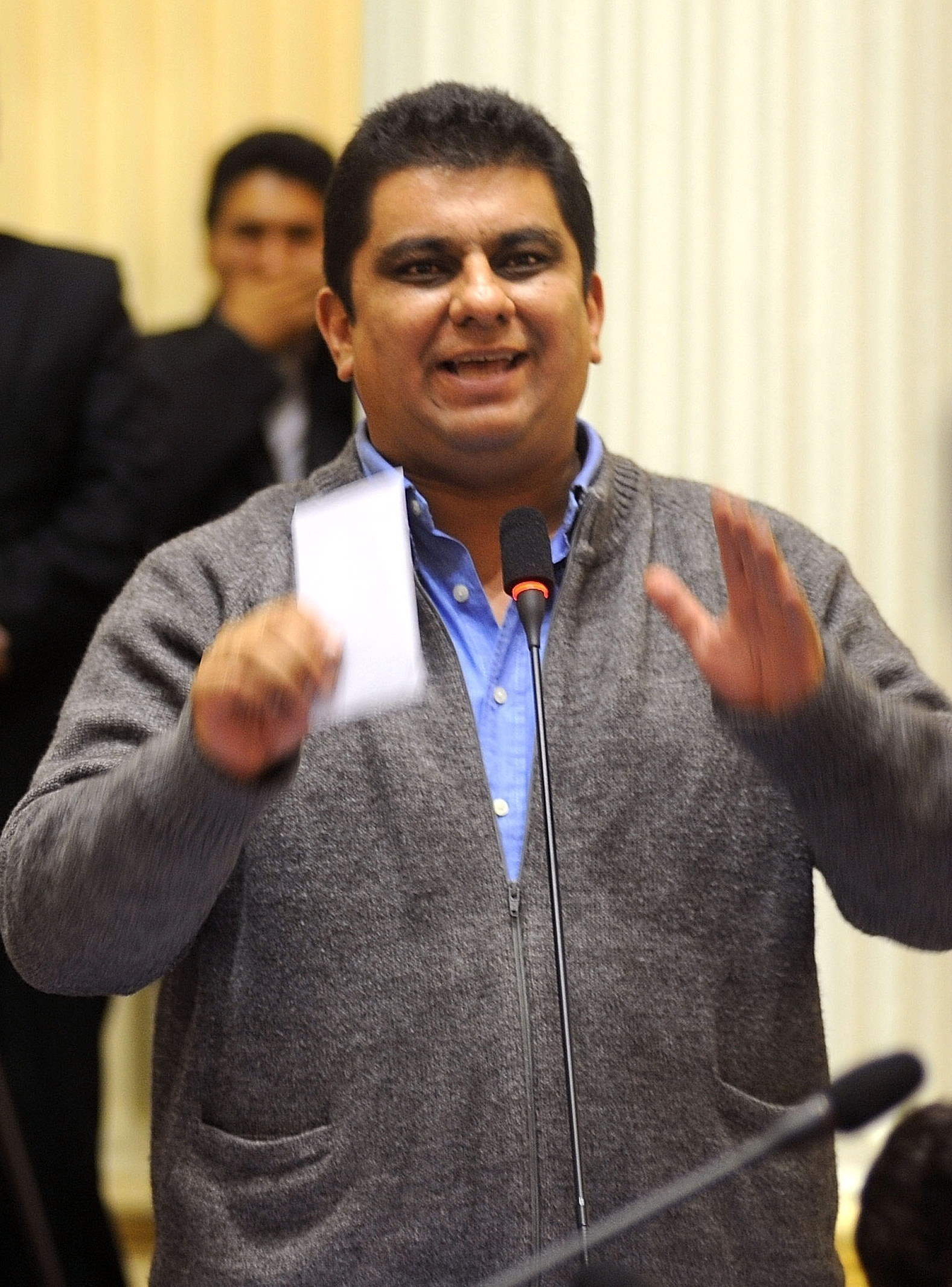

Member of Congress
- In office 26 July 2006 – 26 July 2011
- Constituency: Lima

Personal details
- Born: Carlos Fernando Raffo Arce; 28 November 1967 (age 58) Lima, Peru
- Party: Popular Force
- Other political affiliations: Sí Cumple; Alliance for the Future
- Profession: Politician

Carlos Fernando Raffo Arce (born 28 November 1967) is a Peruvian Fujimorist politician, and a former Congressman representing Lima for the 2006–2011 term. Raffo was elected under the Alliance for the Future and belongs to the Sí Cumple party. He is one of the main supporters of former President Alberto Fujimori. During his government, Raffo was his campaign advisor. He is considered among the most loyal to the former Peruvian president. Raffo lost his seat when he ran for re-election in the 2011 general election under the Force 2011 of former President Fujimori's daughter Keiko but, he was not elected.

== Political career ==
Raffo is a former Congressman, elected in the 2006 general elections, representing Lima for the 2006–2011 term. Raffo was elected under the Alliance for the Future and belongs to the Sí Cumple party. He is one of the main supporters of former President Alberto Fujimori. During his government, Raffo was his campaign advisor. He is considered among the most loyal to the former Peruvian president. Raffo lost his seat when he ran for re-election in the 2011 general election under the Force 2011 of former President Fujimori's daughter Keiko but, he was not re-elected.
