= National University of Education Enrique Guzmán y Valle =

- Nacional de Educación Enrique Guzmán y Valle
- Motto: Hominem uti hominem educare oportet
- Type: Public University
- Established: July 6, 1822; 202 years ago
- Rector: Juan Tutuy Aspauza
- Location: Lima, Peru
- Website: www.une.edu.pe

The National University of Education Enrique Guzmán y Valle (Spanish: Universidad Nacional de Educación Enrique Guzmán y Valle), often called La Cantuta, is a university in the Lima area of Peru. The university specializes in education and administration.

During the early 1990s, the university was placed under military control after receiving information that Shining Path and the Túpac Amaru Revolutionary Movement were operating inside and indoctrinating the students. On July 18, 1992, a professor and nine students from the university "disappeared" in what would come to be known as the La Cantuta massacre. The bodies of the victims were eventually discovered, and members of Grupo Colina were jailed for their participation in the massacre. Former president Alberto Fujimori was convicted of murder for his role in the massacre.
