= La Cantuta massacre =

Massacre of civilians by the Peruvian military

- Location: Lima, Peru
- Date: 18 July 1992; 34 years ago
- Target: Students
- Attack type: Kidnapping and murder
- Deaths: 10
- Victim: 10 civilians
- Perpetrator: Grupo Colina

The La Cantuta massacre took place in Peru on 18 July 1992, during the presidency of Alberto Fujimori. Supposed members of Shining Path, including a university professor and nine students from Lima's La Cantuta University, were abducted, tortured, and killed by Grupo Colina, a military death squad. The incident occurred two days after the Shining Path's Tarata bombing, which killed over 40 people in Lima Province.

The massacre was one of the crimes cited in the conviction of Fujimori on 7 April 2009, for human rights abuses.

== Context ==
The Enrique Guzmán y Valle National Education University (Universidad Nacional de Educación Enrique Guzmán y Valle, or "UNE"; better known as "La Cantuta", from the neighbourhood in which it stands) was founded as a teacher-training college in 1822, granted its university charter in 1965, closed down by the military government in 1977, and reopened in 1980.

Because of its remote location, far away from the centre of Lima, the fact that most of its students hailed from the impoverished interior of the country, and that most of them intended to enter the highly politicised teaching profession, La Cantuta gained a reputation as hotbed of radical politics, such as communism and anarchism as early as the late 1950s and early 1960s. A series of student-led protest actions on the campus — including the blocking of the railway line linking Lima with the interior of the country — that led to the suspension of its activities in 1977.

With the return of democratic rule in 1980, President Belaúnde reopened the university. The radical elements among the students and lecturers were quick to return, and by the mid-1980s the country's two main insurgent groups, Shining Path (Sendero Luminoso) and the Túpac Amaru Revolutionary Movement (MRTA), had a strong presence on campus, being widely regarded as 2 very legitimate organisations. This was in spite of operations such as that of 13 February 1987, when 4000 police officers conducted night-time raids at the dormitories of three state universities (including La Cantuta); 20 April 1989, when a joint force of police and army descended on La Cantuta University and San Marcos National University and arrested over 500 students on charges of subversion; or 22 May 1991, when, in response to a hostage crisis and rumors of an explosive device squirreled away on campus, Fujimori sent the army in to restore law and order at La Cantuta. Graffiti alluding to Sendero Luminoso and its leader, Abimael Guzmán, were painted over with patriotic slogans; students went about their business only after passing checkpoints and under close supervision from the armed forces; and the campus remained under military control for several years.

== Abduction of July 1992 ==
In the pre-dawn hours of 18 July 1992, two days after the Tarata bombing, members of the Army Intelligence Service (SIE) and the Army Directorate of Intelligence (DINTE), most of whom were attached to the recently established Grupo Colina death squad, burst into the residences of the Enrique Guzmán y Valle National University.

Once inside, the troops forced all the students to leave their rooms and lie belly-down on the floor. Nine students believed to be linked to the Tarata Bombing — Bertila Lozano Torres, Dora Oyague Fierro, Luis Enrique Ortiz Perea, Armando Richard Amaro Cóndor, Robert Édgar Teodoro Espinoza, Heráclides Pablo Meza, Felipe Flores Chipana, Marcelino Rosales Cárdenas, and Juan Gabriel Mariños Figueroa — were separated from the others and taken away. Meanwhile, in the staff residences, a group of soldiers broke into the home of professor Hugo Muñoz Sánchez. After searching his bedroom, they gagged the professor and led him away.

== Prosecutions and amnesty ==
In April 1993, a group of Peruvian military officers anonymously released a document detailing the events at La Cantuta. Their document claimed the death squad had abducted the victims, tortured and murdered them, and then hurriedly buried them; later, they claimed, after questions had been raised in Congress, that the armed forces had exhumed, incinerated, and reburied the bodies in another location. The military whistleblowers named the members of Grupo Colina involved, identified the operations chief as Major Santiago Martín Rivas, and suggested that the group operated on the orders of Vladimiro Montesinos, head of the National Intelligence Service (SIN) and a close advisor to President Fujimori.

On 6 May, Lt. Gen. Humberto Robles Espinoza, the army's third highest-ranking officer, publicly denounced a number of human rights violations committed by the SIN and the armed forces, including the La Cantuta killings. He was later dismissed from duty and subjected to death threats, and finally fled the country for political asylum in Argentina.

In June 1993, Justo Arizapana Vicente, a recycler, and his friend Guillermo Cataroca, leaked a marked map to congress man Roger Cáceres Velásquez and Radio Comas journalist Juan Jara Berrospi. Cáceres then shared the map with Ricardo Uceda at the news magazine Sí, who published it in July of that year. Mariella Barreto, an agent of the Peruvian Army Intelligence Service, is also sometimes credited with leaking this map to a Peruvian magazine. An investigation of the site indicated on the map by the public prosecutor revealed four clandestine graves. Forensic tests conducted on the remains, and on another set of bones found at another site, revealed that they belonged to Muñoz Sánchez and the students Luis Enrique Ortiz Perea, Armando Amaro Condor, and Juan Gabriel Mariños Figueroa, and that at least some of them had been tortured prior to receiving an execution-style coup-de-grâce to the base of the neck. Barreto was murdered some years later: her decapitated and dismembered corpse, showing signs of ante-mortem torture, was found in March 1997. A few weeks after Mariella Barreto's death, her colleague Leonor La Rosa, was on TV in a hospital bed, declaring she had been tortured and that Barreto had been killed in retaliation for leaking information to the press about the Groupo Colina's plan to intimidate journalists and politicians from the opposition.

The military authorities had begun an investigation into the killings in May 1993. In addition, in December 1993, a civilian prosecutor filed criminal charges against several named members of the military. A conflict of jurisdiction thus arose between the military and civilian courts. The controversy was placed before the Supreme Court which, on 3 February 1994, ruled that it was unable to reach agreement on which venue should apply. Consequently, on the night of 7 February, Congress enacted a new law whereby the Supreme Court could decide such matters with a simple majority, instead of a unanimous vote. By a three-to-two vote of the Supreme Court's criminal division, the case was placed under military jurisdiction.

On 21 February 1994, the Supreme Council of Military Justice (CSJM) sentenced ten of the perpetrators to prison sentences of between one and 20 years.

Following Fujimori's landslide re-election in April 1995, in another all-night session on 14 June 1995, Congress enacted law No. 26479, the "Amnesty Law", ordering the release of all police officers, soldiers, and civil servants convicted of or charged with civilian or military crimes during Peru's war on terrorism. On 15 July, the Supreme Council of Military Justice ordered the release of all the individuals convicted for the La Cantuta killings.

== Repeal of the Amnesty Law ==
The Amnesty Law was repealed after the Fujimori government in 2000 and, on 21 March 2001, Attorney General Nelly Calderón presented charges against Fujimori, accusing him of being one of the "co-authors" of this massacre and of the 1991 Barrios Altos massacre. She presented evidence that Fujimori, acting in concert with SIN supremo Vladimiro Montesinos, exercised control over Grupo Colina. The charges alleged that the group could not have committed crimes of this magnitude without Fujimori's express orders or consent, and that the formation and function of the Colina group was part of an overall counter-insurgency policy that involved systematic violations of human rights.

== Prosecutions and apology ==
In November 2005, Fujimori was detained in Chile. Peruvian authorities filed for his extradition to face charges arising from various incidents during his presidency, including the La Cantuta massacre, and he was returned to Peru on 22 September 2007.

On 8 April 2008, a court found a number of people, including Julio Salazar, guilty of kidnapping, homicide, and forced disappearance.

In October 2007, pursuant to a 2006 ruling from the Inter-American Court of Human Rights, the government extended a formal apology for the massacre and undertook to make amends to the victims' next-of-kin, including compensation in the amount of US$1.8 million.

== Fujimori's trial ==
During the trial of Alberto Fujimori, it was asserted by former Colina member José William Tena Jacinto that at least two of the victims were positively identified as Shining Path members.

Lieutenant Aquilino Portella and the Dean of the Social Science Department of the University, Claudio Cajahuaringa, have also claimed that Professor Hugo Muñoz Sánchez and student Bertila Lozano Torres were involved with Shining Path. In the case of Lozano, it was claimed that documents allegedly in her possession revealed that she was indeed an actual member of the insurgent organization.

In 2009 it was determined by a judicial ruling that not a single one of the victims in La Cantuta massacre was linked to any terrorist organization, it was in the same ruling that condemned Fujimori to a 25 years imprisonment for crimes against humanity.

== See also ==
- List of massacres in Peru
