= Grupo Colina =

Peruvian military death squad

Colina Group
- Grupo Colina
- Other name: Lima Detachment (Destacamento Lima)
- Leaders: Santiago Martín Rivas; Carlos Pichilingue Guevara
- Military leader: Nicolás de Bari Hermoza Ríos
- Political leader: Vladimiro Montesinos
- Founded: August 1991
- Dates active: 1991–1994
- Dissolved: 1994
- Country: Peru
- Allegiance: Alberto Fujimori
- Part of: Peruvian Army (formally); National Intelligence Service (operationally)
- Wars: Internal conflict in Peru

The Colina Group (Spanish: grupo Colina) was a Peruvian death squad that operated out of the Peruvian Army during the internal conflict in Peru. Although composed of active-duty military personnel, it functioned outside the formal military chain of command as a clandestine assassination unit. At the post-conflict Peruvian tribunals, the Colina Group was declared to be a criminal organization due to its systematic involvement in extrajudicial killings and crimes against humanity. The detachment was composed of army officers and intelligence agents. Named Colina after a deceased intelligence officer killed by insurgents, it was one of the most notorious paramilitary units fielded by the Fujimori administration during the 1990s. Formed in August 1991, it was built around a cadre from the Army Intelligence Service (SIE) but bypassed standard military theater commanders to operate directly under the National Intelligence Service (SIN).

Elements of the detachment carried out massacres against unarmed civilians in the Barrios Altos neighborhood in early November 1991, alongside the targeted assassination of trade unionists and journalists. The detachment's operations subsequently expanded outside the capital; in May 1992, they deployed to the Santa District in the Ancash region to execute peasant farmers. The unit's most notorious action occurred on 18 July 1992, when military operatives of the Colina detachment abducted and murdered nine students and a professor from La Cantuta university. The government attempted to conceal the evidence, but the exposure of the clandestine graves resulted in the detachment being formally dissolved in early 1994.

The Inter-American Court of Human Rights subsequently ruled that the 1995 amnesty laws shielding the detachment were incompatible with international law. This landmark decision stripped the military commanders and intelligence advisors of their legal immunity, mandating their prosecution for crimes against humanity. After the detachment was exposed, former President Alberto Fujimori was extradited from Chile to face the Peruvian tribunals, and Vladimiro Montesinos went on to be convicted alongside Santiago Martín Rivas to 25 years in prison for aggravated homicide and illicit association during the judicial proceedings of October 2010.

== Background and formation ==
After the election of the agronomist and political outsider Alberto Fujimori to the presidency of Peru in June 1990, the new administration inherited a severe economic crisis and an expanding internal conflict against the Shining Path (often called the PCP-SL, from the Spanish: Partido Comunista del Perú – Sendero Luminoso) and the Túpac Amaru Revolutionary Movement (MRTA). The Peruvian state had previously responded to the insurgencies with a conventional counter-insurgency strategy that relied on indiscriminate military sweeps and the declaration of emergency zones. Peruvian authorities, led by the Armed Forces, had launched a campaign that resulted in massive civilian casualties, forced disappearances and extrajudicial killings targeting the rural peasant population living within the conflict areas.

Despite the military's use of overwhelming force, sectors of the armed forces quickly became dissatisfied with the conventional strategy. A military intelligence assessment reported that the indiscriminate approach was failing to contain the subversive movements. By the late 1980s, fierce fighting had expanded from the Andean highlands into the capital city of Lima. Some military officers became convinced that the existing methods were counterproductive, and drafted a "Politico-Military Plan" advocating for a shift toward intelligence-led operations and the "selective elimination" of suspected subversives. The military accused legal left-wing political parties and trade unions of acting as front organizations for the insurgencies and advocated for similar aggressive measures against the civilian opposition. The civilian population received little protection from the Peruvian judicial system, which the military described as inefficient and overly lenient. Specialized intelligence units were raised, but these were initially focused on legal police work and only one, the National Directorate Against Terrorism (DIRCOTE) led by the Peruvian National Police, was of any significant intelligence value.

The Fujimori administration sought to neutralize opposition to its economic reforms and consolidate an authoritarian political project, and saw the military's new intelligence strategy as a means to achieve those aims. Prominent military officers were friendly towards Fujimori's chief security advisor, Vladimiro Montesinos, a former army captain who centralized the state's intelligence apparatus. This push was strongly opposed by institutionalist military officers as counter to the traditional chain of command of the armed forces. By August 1990, the government had implemented the "Fujishock", a radical neoliberal structural adjustment program that exacerbated poverty and generated widespread social unrest. While this policy received international approval, it created significant domestic problems for Fujimori, and Montesinos saw this as an opportunity to utilize the military's counter-insurgency apparatus to target civil society actors. In late 1991, Fujimori authorised the promotion of loyalist officers to bypass the institutionalists, notably appointing General Nicolás de Bari Hermoza Ríos as Commanding General of the Army. The military apparatus was utilized to systematically eliminate trade unionists, left-wing politicians, and grassroots community organizers that opposed the adjustment.

== Chain of command and financing ==
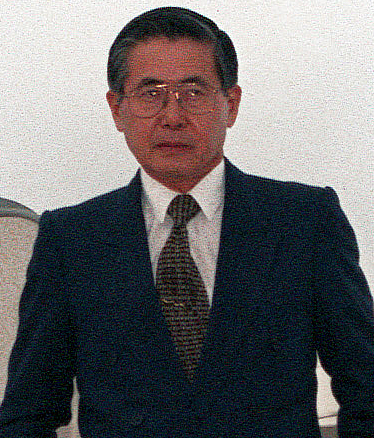
Former President Alberto Fujimori, who was convicted as the "perpetrator by means" of the Colina Group's massacres.

The Peruvian government sought to establish a specialized assassination unit to expand the operational reach of the National Intelligence Service (SIN) within the capital. In August 1991, officers within the Army Intelligence Directorate (DINTE) drafted a counter-subversive manual that formally approved the creation of a special operations detachment, intending to finalize its training by the end of the year. On the recommendation of DINTE director General Juan Rivero Lazo, Montesinos embedded the new detachment within the Army Intelligence Service (SIE) rather than the SIN. This arrangement was designed to shield the executive branch and preserve the administration's plausible deniability. The new detachment was named Colina after José Colina Gaige, an army intelligence officer who had been killed in 1984 while infiltrating the Shining Path.

Orders were given to the SIE to provide a cadre for the new detachment, and Lieutenant Colonel Fernando Rodríguez Zabalbeascoa, an intelligence officer from the DINTE, was appointed as the new detachment's commanding officer. The formation of the detachment was organized internally, so operations did not begin until the unit was fully staffed. In late 1991, Rivero Lazo appointed Major Santiago Martín Rivas to act as the chief of operations and Major Carlos Pichilingue Guevara to serve as the administrative chief. The detachment was to form at "La Tiza", an exclusive army beach south of Lima, where the military conducted physical conditioning, close-quarters combat training, and mock raids.

In August 1991, approximately thirty non-commissioned officers (NCOs) and intelligence agents selected for the Colina Group convened at the SIE maintenance warehouse in Lima before transitioning into active operations. The roster included operatives from various intelligence sections, several of whom possessed prior experience in clandestine warfare. Army officers and NCOs were also provided by the DINTE. The detachment established its administrative headquarters in the Miraflores district of Lima, with a safe house functioning under the guise of a front company named Compañía de Proyectos América Sociedad Anónima (COMPRANSA). The operatives for the detachment were divided into three sub-groups, commanded by NCOs Jesús Sosa Saavedra, Julio Chuqui Aguirre, and Pedro Supo Sánchez.

By late 1991 the detachment reached a strength of a few dozen men, composed of army officers and intelligence agents, representing a highly specialized fraction of the army's overall intelligence apparatus. Unlike a rogue paramilitary militia, the Colina Group was an organic military detachment embedded within the formal structure of the Peruvian Army. Administratively, the unit was subordinate to the SIE, which in turn reported to the DINTE. The detachment was financed through classified black budgets provided by the DINTE and the SIN; operatives received their standard military salaries supplemented by operational stipends and bonuses for completed assassinations. The army provided the unit with specialized equipment, including suppressed HK submachine guns, explosives, and unmarked civilian vehicles.

Despite its formal placement within the army, the Colina Group operated through a parallel chain of command controlled by the executive branch. Operational orders for assassinations and kidnappings routinely bypassed the standard military theater commanders and were issued directly by Montesinos from the SIN. The orders became fully operational with the authorization of General Hermoza Ríos and President Fujimori. This parallel structure allowed the SIN to utilize army personnel and resources for operations that served the political interests of the regime. In the meantime, the government continued to advance its neoliberal reforms, and the Colina Group was utilized as a clandestine assassination unit to eliminate perceived obstacles to the administration's agenda.

== Operations and massacres (1991–1992) ==
Key locations of the Colina Group's operations (1991–1992).

The detachment's first major operation occurred on 3 November 1991 in the Barrios Altos neighborhood of Lima. Orders were given to the Colina Group to eliminate suspected Shining Path members gathering at a property on Jirón Huanta, which military intelligence believed was being used to raise funds for the insurgency. Acting on intelligence provided by a Peruvian Army infiltrator, heavily armed operatives arrived at the location in unmarked civilian vehicles. They entered the building's courtyard and opened fire on the attendees with suppressed submachine guns. The operatives killed 15 civilians, including an eight-year-old child, and severely injured four others. None of the victims had ties to subversive organizations. The Truth and Reconciliation Commission later determined that the intelligence was faulty.

Following the 5 April 1992 coup d'état, the detachment's operations were expanded outside the capital to target political dissidents and organized labor. On 2 May 1992, elements of the Colina Group were deployed to the Santa District in the Ancash region. The operatives kidnapped and executed nine peasant farmers who were involved in a local land dispute and had been protesting the labor practices of local landowners. To conceal the army's involvement and deflect blame, the detachment painted pro-Shining Path slogans at the scene of the abductions. The following month, on 24 June, the detachment abducted Pedro Yauri, a radio journalist who had broadcast criticisms of the government and the armed forces. Yauri was transported to a beach near Huacho, where he was interrogated by Martín Rivas and subsequently executed.

In mid-July 1992, the Shining Path launched a major offensive in Lima, detonating a massive car bomb on Tarata Street in the Miraflores district. In retaliation, the commander of the army ordered the Colina Group to conduct a raid on the Enrique Guzmán y Valle National University, commonly known as "La Cantuta", which military intelligence believed was a center of subversive recruitment. During the early hours of 18 July, the detachment entered the military-controlled university campus and abducted nine students and a professor. The victims were secretly transported to a ravine outside the city, where they were executed and buried in clandestine graves. When the remains were nearly discovered by the press a year later, the operatives exhumed the bodies and incinerated them in an attempt to destroy the evidence.

The detachment was also utilized to eliminate high-profile figures of the civilian opposition. On 18 December 1992, Pedro Huilca, the Secretary General of the Confederation of Peruvian Workers (CGTP), was assassinated outside his home in Los Olivos. Huilca had been a vocal critic of the administration's neoliberal economic policies, and Fujimori had publicly accused the union leadership of acting in collusion with terrorist organizations. While the Shining Path initially claimed responsibility for the assassination in their clandestine newspaper, subsequent investigations and testimonies from former intelligence agents revealed that the Colina Group had carried out the killing on direct orders from the SIN.

== Dissolution and the Amnesty Laws ==
To maintain popular support for his authoritarian regime, the Fujimori administration actively concealed the detachment's existence from the civilian population. The president systematically denied the military's involvement in the massacres, allowing the armed forces to operate with absolute impunity while the intelligence services intimidated the political opposition. On 2 April 1993, the Peruvian Congress authorized an immediate investigation into the Colina Group, intending to conclude hearings by late June. Coordinating with Montesinos, General Hermoza Ríos obstructed the congressional inquiries. Rather than cooperating with civilian authorities, he deployed military tanks in the streets of Lima, arguing that a legislative investigation would severely damage the morale of the armed forces.

The investigation of the detachment was delayed by a jurisdictional dispute, as the Supreme Council of Military Justice (CSJM) actively obstructed civilian inquiries, meaning civilian prosecutions could not proceed. On 6 May 1993, dissident military officers leaked documents detailing the Colina Group's operations, and the clandestine graves of the La Cantuta victims were discovered in Cieneguilla on 8 July. They included keys and personal effects from the abducted students, as well as physical evidence of the executions. As civilian courts attempted to assert jurisdiction in early 1994, the military preemptively confined the operatives to military detention facilities to face a court-martial. The Fujimori administration swiftly intervened to resolve the jurisdictional conflict in favor of the armed forces, effectively abandoning any civilian prosecution. On 8 February 1994, the Fujimori-backed Congress passed the "Cantuta Law", which formally transferred jurisdiction to the military courts. A small number of operatives from the detachment were convicted by the military tribunal to sentences of up to twenty years, and the Colina Group was formally dissolved.

On 14 June 1995, the Peruvian Congress passed Law No. 26479, a general amnesty law that exonerated military and police personnel from responsibility for human rights violations committed during the internal conflict. Faced with resistance from a civilian judge who declared the amnesty unconstitutional, the Congress passed a second amnesty law, Law No. 26492, on 28 June 1995. The new legislation prohibited judicial review of the amnesty, and the imprisoned members of the Colina Group were immediately released.

The post-conflict Inter-American Court of Human Rights (IACtHR) subsequently ruled that the amnesty laws were manifestly incompatible with the American Convention on Human Rights, citing the state's systematic use of extrajudicial executions. Issued on 14 March 2001 in the Barrios Altos case, the ruling established that self-amnesty laws intended to prevent the investigation and punishment of serious human rights violations lack legal effect. The judgment stripped the perpetrators of their legal immunity, mandating that the Peruvian state investigate and sanction those who ordered and executed the massacres. The decision set a major precedent in international human rights law, ensuring that domestic amnesty laws could no longer be used to shield state agents from criminal accountability.

== Judicial trials and convictions ==
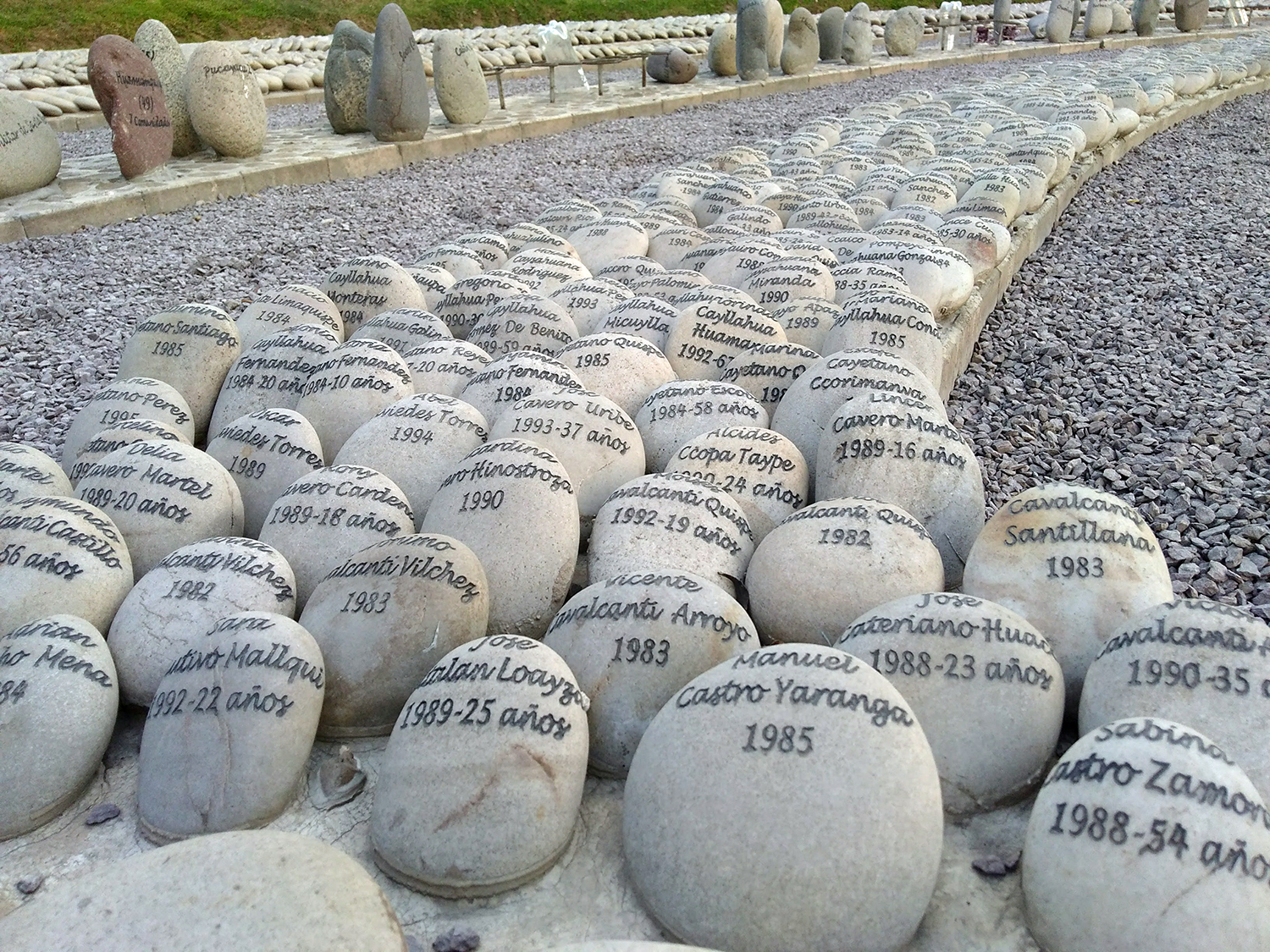
El Ojo que Llora (The Eye That Cries) memorial in Lima, which bears the names of the victims of the internal conflict, including those killed by the Colina Group.

Following the regime's collapse, the transitional government prioritized prosecuting former members of the Colina Group to dismantle Peru's legacy of impunity. Authorities established a Truth and Reconciliation Commission (CVR) composed of independent investigators, tasking them with documenting human rights abuses. The findings of this commission, reinforced by the rulings of the IACtHR, provided the evidentiary and legal foundation for a transitional justice apparatus focused on criminal prosecutions. On 14 March 2001, the IACtHR mandated the prosecution of the detachment, ordering the Peruvian state to immediately investigate and sanction the perpetrators. Adhering to recommendations from the Inter-American Commission on Human Rights, the Peruvian state committed to trying the detachment in ordinary civilian courts rather than the military justice system, where human rights advocates feared the armed forces would compromise the integrity of the proceedings.

The Peruvian judiciary established a specialized legal framework for the new human rights trials, and Alberto Fujimori, the former president who had fled to Japan in 2000, was extradited from Chile as the primary defendant. The prosecution of the detachment was delayed by numerous legal appeals and procedural challenges filed by the defense, meaning the final verdicts were not delivered until 7 April 2009. On that date, the Supreme Court convicted Fujimori to 25 years in prison and declared him the "perpetrator by means" (autor mediato) of the massacres, which were given the legal classification of crimes against humanity.

On 1 October 2010, a civilian tribunal in Lima convicted Vladimiro Montesinos, General Nicolás de Bari Hermoza Ríos, General Julio Salazar Monroe, and Major Santiago Martín Rivas, sentencing each to 25 years in prison. The defendants represented the highest echelons of the intelligence directorate alongside the detachment's operational commanders. Former officers and NCOs were also convicted by the tribunals to sentences ranging from 15 to 20 years for the massacres at Barrios Altos and El Santa, and the murder of Pedro Yauri. Grounded in international human rights law, the verdicts encompassed charges of aggravated homicide, kidnapping, and illicit association.

While serving their sentences in maximum-security prisons, the former operatives faced additional indictments for the assassination of Pedro Huilca. The defense secured a temporary legal victory when a tribunal controversially acquitted the operatives in November 2023. The Supreme Court reviewed the appeals from the victims' families, and the acquittals were formally annulled on 1 July 2026. Despite its short existence, the Colina Group is considered one of the most notorious death squads fielded by the Peruvian state during the internal conflict. After the detachment was disbanded, the judicial precedents were used to prosecute other military units, and Martín Rivas went on to serve his sentence alongside Montesinos in the Callao naval base during the final decades of his life.

The post-conflict Peruvian tribunals formally designated the Colina Group as a criminal organization, citing its systematic use of extrajudicial killings and assassinations of trade unionists. Lenient sentencing or exemptions were granted only to lower-ranking operatives who collaborated with the justice system and had not directly commanded the executions.

== See also ==
- Internal conflict in Peru
- Rodrigo Franco Command
- Truth and Reconciliation Commission (Peru)

== Bibliography ==
- Burt, Jo-Marie (2007). Political Violence and the Authoritarian State in Peru: Silencing Civil Society. New York: Palgrave Macmillan. ISBN 978-0-230-60038-6.
- Comisión de la Verdad y Reconciliación (2003). Informe Final (Report) (in Spanish). Lima: CVR.
- "Condenan a 25 años de cárcel a Montesinos y al grupo Colina por matanzas". El Mundo (in Spanish). 2 October 2010.
- "El Grupo Colina no escapará de la justicia". La República (in Spanish). 3 July 2026.
- Inter-American Court of Human Rights (2001). Caso Barrios Altos Vs. Perú: Sentencia de 14 de marzo de 2001 (Fondo) (Report) (in Spanish). San José, Costa Rica: Corte IDH.
- Laplante, Lisa J. (2009). "Outlawing Amnesty: The Return of Criminal Justice in Transitional Justice Schemes". Virginia Journal of International Law. 49 (4): 915–984.
- "PJ anula la absolución de Vladimiro Montesinos y del Grupo Colina por el asesinato de Pedro Huilca: ordenan nuevo juicio". Infobae (in Spanish). 1 July 2026.
- Uceda, Ricardo (2004). Muerte en el Pentagonito: Los cementerios secretos del Ejército Peruano (in Spanish). Lima: Planeta. ISBN 978-958-42-1071-5.
