= Barrios Altos massacre =

Massacre perpetrated by the Grupo Colina

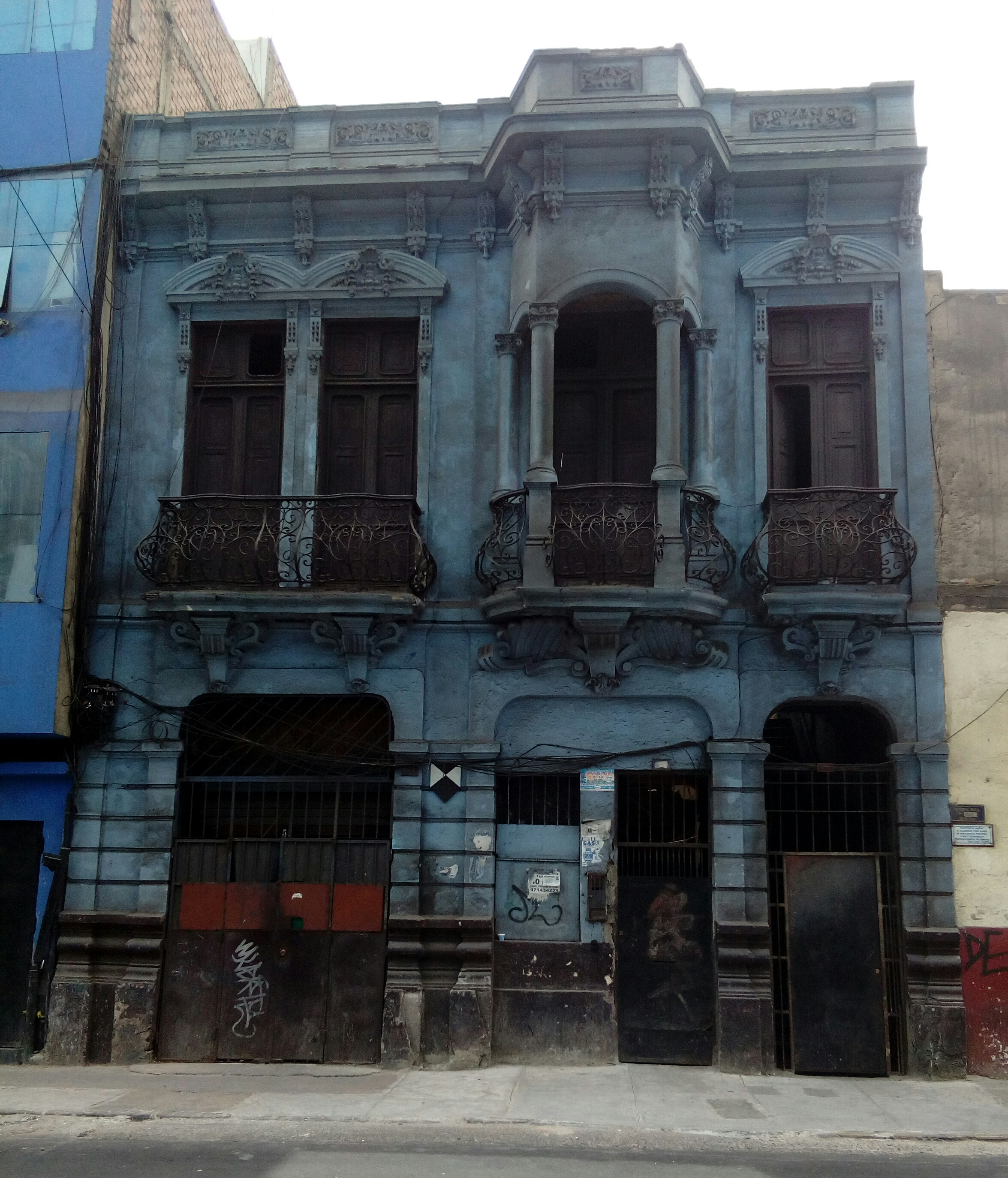
- Location of the events
- Location: Barrios Altos, Lima, Peru
- Date: 3 November 1991; 34 years ago
- Target: Shining Path militants (intended)
- Attack type: Mass shooting
- Deaths: 15
- Injuries: 4
- Victim: Civilians
- Perpetrator: Grupo Colina
- No. of participants: 6

The Barrios Altos massacre (Spanish: Masacre de Barrios Altos) occurred on 3 November 1991 in the Barrios Altos neighborhood of Lima, Peru. Members of Grupo Colina, a death squad comprising Peruvian Armed Forces personnel, were later identified as the assailants who killed fifteen individuals, including an eight-year-old child, and injured four others. The victims were reportedly partygoers associated with the Marxist-Leninist-Maoist group Shining Path. Nevertheless, judicial authorities found that they were not terrorists.

The massacre came to symbolize the widespread human rights abuses that occurred during the presidency of Alberto Fujimori. In August 2001, following a ruling by the Inter-American Court of Human Rights, the Peruvian government agreed to pay $3.3 million in compensation to the victims and their families. The case was also among those examined by the Truth and Reconciliation Commission after Fujimori's government fell in 2000.

The Barrios Altos massacre was one of the crimes cited in the request for Fujimori's extradition from Japan to Peru in 2003. On 20 September 2007, he was eventually extradited from Chile to Peru to stand trial for the massacre, among other charges.

== Background ==
Peru had been struggling to control the rebellion by the group known as Shining Path. For more than a decade, they had committed acts of terrorism against government officials, community leaders and innocent bystanders: assassinations, car bombings and other violence.

== Massacre ==
On the evening of 3 November 1991, a neighborhood barbecue was being held at 840 Jirón Huanta to collect funds to repair the building. People from the community were gathered on the first floor. At approximately 23:30, between six and eight individuals armed with pistols and handguns burst into the building. They arrived in two vehicles equipped with police lights and sirens.

The assailants, who were said to range from 25 to 30 years of age, had their faces covered with balaclava masks and ordered the victims to lie on the floor. They fired at them for about two minutes, killing 15, including an eight-year-old boy, and seriously wounding another four. One of the injured was permanently disabled.

"…It happened around 10pm during a fundraising party, which was to collect donations for improvements to the residence block. Then, at that time, a group of six uniformed people entered abruptly, two were leading and had their faces covered. They started saying things like … miserable terrorists, you are going to get it now … they insulted us and ordered us to lay on the ground. There is the case of Tomás Livias, one of those present, he resisted … and they hit his back and chest with the butts of their rifles and threw him to the ground. One man stood up and said: I’m the one who organized this, do it to me. They shot him. They machined-gunned him and he fell. They went to the right, towards a room where … there were two girls. They went and finished them off with shots, they returned to attack us when we were on the floor. Then the massacre started…"

— Alfonso Rodas Alvitres, survivor of the massacre.

During their investigation, the police found 111 cartridges and 33 bullets of the same caliber at the scene. They determined the assailants had used sub-machine guns equipped with silencers.

== Aftermath ==
Judicial investigations and newspaper reports revealed that those involved worked for military intelligence; they were members of the Grupo Colina, which was known for conducting an anti-terrorist program including direct attacks on suspects. The goal was to attack a meeting of Shining Path rebels, which was being held at the same time on the second floor of the same building.

Several weeks later, Congress convened an investigation committee to look in to the massacre. In December, the Committee conducted an inspection of the building where the events took place, interviewed four people and performed other tasks. It was unable to complete its investigation, because of Fujimori's "palace coup" on 5 April, 1992, in which he dissolved Congress. The Democratic Constitutional Congress elected in its place in November 1992 did not take up the investigation again nor publish the senatorial committee's preliminary findings.

== Amnesty ==
Judicial authorities were unable to launch an investigation of the incident until April 1995, at which time the military courts responded by filing a petition before the Supreme Court for jurisdiction over the case. Before the Court ruled on the petition, the case was effectively closed by Congress' passage of law No. 26479, which granted a general amnesty to all those members of the security forces and civilians who were the subject of a complaint, investigation, indictment, trial or conviction, or who were serving prison sentences, for human rights violations committed after May 1980.

Prior to the amnesty law being passed, investigations had revealed compromising information. In May 1993, and again in January 1995, some officers from the Peruvian army stated publicly that members of Grupo Colina were responsible for the Barrios Altos massacre. The officers also stated that the head of the Joint Command of the Armed Forces and of the National Intelligence Service (SIN) had full knowledge of the massacre.

== Inter-American Court of Human Rights ==
Advocates, survivors and victims' relatives filed a suit in the Inter-American Court of Human Rights against the Peruvian government for violation of human rights. Established in 1979 by the Organization of American States (OAS), the court made its judgment of 14 March 2001, finding that the government was in the wrong and ordering compensation be paid to the victims. Because the Peruvian government underwent a change in administration that year, the court agreed to postpone signing the settlement agreement until a new government was elected and had taken office.

== Case reopened ==
After the Fujimori government in 2000, Congress repealed the Amnesty Law. The Barrios Altos case was reopened, and a number of suspects were taken into custody. On 21 March 2001, the Peruvian Attorney General Nelly Calderón presented charges against Fujimori in Congress, accusing him of being a "co-author" of the massacre. She presented evidence that Fujimori, acting in concert with Vladimiro Montesinos, head of the SIN, exercised control over Grupo Colina. The charges alleged that the group acted under Fujimori's express orders or consent, and that the formation and functioning of the Colina group was part of an overall counter-insurgency policy. According to the report, Fujimori went to SIN headquarters to celebrate with intelligence officers after the massacre took place.

As a result of the August 2001 ruling of the Inter-American Court of Human Rights of the OAS, which had heard the case, the government of Peru agreed to pay USD $3.3 million in compensation to the four survivors and the relatives of the fifteen people murdered. It waited until the new government had been elected to sign the ruling later that year.

On 13 September 2001, Supreme Court Justice José Luis Lecaros issued an international warrant to Interpol for the arrest of Fujimori, then living in Japan. In August 2003, the Peruvian government submitted a request for the extradition of Fujimori from Japan; among the crimes it cited was the Barrios Altos massacre. Initially Japan had resisted extradition because Fujimori's parents had emigrated to Peru from Japan and it considered him a national of Japan. Its laws prohibited extradition of nationals; in addition, Japan and Peru did not then have an extradition agreement. Peru finally gained his extradition when Fujimori traveled to Chile. He was tried and convicted for his role in the massacre.

== See also ==
- List of massacres in Peru
