= History of Peru (1980–2000) =

Period of the history of Peru

Republic of Peru República del Perú
- 1980–2000
- Flag Coat of arms
- Motto: "Firme y feliz por la unión" (Spanish) "Firm and Happy for the Union"
- Anthem: "Himno Nacional de Perú" (Spanish) "National Anthem of Peru" March: "Marcha de Banderas" (Spanish) "March of Flags"
- Capital: Lima
- Common languages: Spanish (official)
- Demonym: Peruvian
- Government: Unitary presidential republic: under a Fujimorist civil dictatorship (1992-2000)
- President
  - 1980–1985: Fernando Belaúnde
  - 1985–1990: Alan García
  - 1990–2000: Alberto Fujimori
- Legislature: National Congress
- Historical era: Cold War and aftermath
  - New assembly: 1978–1979
  - Conflict begins: 17 May 1980
  - General elections: 18 May 1980
  - Paquisha incident: Jan–Feb 1981
  - General elections: 14 April 1985
  - General elections: April–June 1990
  - Fujimorazo: 5 April 1992
  - Operation Victoria: 12 September 1992
  - Cenepa War: Jan–Feb 1995
  - Embassy crisis: 1996–1997
  - Embassy liberated: 22 April 1997
  - Four Suyos march: 26–28 July 2000
  - Fall of Fujimori: 22 November 2000
- Currency: Nuevo sol Inti (1985–1991); Sol de oro (until 1985)
- ISO 3166 code: PE
Preceded by	Succeeded by
Peru	Peru

The history of Peru between 1980 and 2000 corresponds to the period following the general elections that put an end to the twelve-year military dictatorship that ruled the country since 1968, with Fernando Belaúnde taking office in 1980. The following decade became known as the "lost decade" after the economic stagnation the country experienced, followed by hyperinflation at the end of the decade.

What became known as the Peruvian conflict began almost simultaneously with the election, as a ballot burning incident in Chuschi. This was followed by skirmishes and attacks against civilians and military personnel, carried out by the Shining Path (led by Abimael Guzmán) and the Túpac Amaru Revolutionary Movement (led by Víctor Polay Campos). This violent period conflict would continue for twenty years. The subsequent democratic governments of Fernando Belaúnde and Alan García were unable to respond adequately to these subversive groups, but, by the mid-1990s, during the government of Alberto Fujimori, the former was dismantled with the capture of its leader and the leadership of the terrorist organization by the Special Intelligence Group.

In 1992, Alberto Fujimori dissolved Congress and carried out a self-coup. As a result, his regime became a civil dictatorship known as the Fujimorato. This government characterised by the implementation of neoliberal policies ended in mid-2000, amid great popular rejection and strong accusations of corruption. After Fujimori left for Japan, a transitional government headed by Valentín Paniagua was established.

== Background ==
General Juan Velasco Alvarado carried out a coup d'état on October 3, 1968 and proclaimed a military dictatorship known as the "Revolutionary Government of the Armed Forces". He expropriated almost all of Peru's private companies, isolated the country from the foreign market and refused to pay the State's foreign debt for 11 years. During this dictatorship, he increased the rate of imports of vehicles to more than 300% and prohibited the free exchange of foreign currencies.

State companies were precarious and filled with thousands of public employees who were relatives of the military. Private vehicles were considered "luxury items" and not instruments of work, and they were sold at exorbitant rates. The supposed substitution of imports through the industrialisation of the country was a deception. The maximum that was achieved was to assemble 2 brands of vehicles that were exaggeratedly more expensive than importing them from their country of origin: Volkswagen and Toyota. The few manufacturing companies were monopolistic, with low quality and high price products because there was no incentive for investment or competition between companies in the same field.

The farmers to whom the State handed over the expropriated estates were abandoned to their fate and were left in the hands of officials who limited themselves to collecting taxes from them. Corruption spread to the poorest, whom they supposedly intended to protect or vindicate. The financial crisis at the end of the 1970s led to the removal of the military from their positions, but not before stealing the profits of the expropriated companies. The Armed Forces convened a Constituent Assembly to modify the country's constitution so that it contained the role of the business state, a fact that was endorsed by American Popular Revolutionary Alliance (APRA). The Peruvian left did not sign the constitution because it meant its end, since the next step was the call for democratic elections.

The economic, cultural, financial and moral damage to the country suffered during this period, which anecdotally included attacks by the Peruvian military against Chile supposedly to recover Arica and Tarapacá—territories lost during the War of the Pacific—constituted the so-called "lost decade" of the country.

== History ==
=== Government of Fernando Belaúnde (1980–1985) ===
Belaunde's government generated many expectations among the population, since it was a return to democracy after a 12-year interruption. Many of the most radical reforms applied during the dictatorship were repealed, such as returning the media to their original owners. In this way, freedom of expression once again played an important role in Peruvian politics.

The president-elect surrounded himself with a liberal economic team, led by Manuel Ulloa Elías, director of the newspaper Expreso and minister of economy of his government, who displaced several of the former leaders of Acción Popular. The proposed economic reforms, however, could not be implemented for the most part.

==== Terrorism ====
The same year as the elections, the Maoist terrorist group Shining Path declared war on the Peruvian State in the southern Andean department of Ayacucho. This group was led by Abimael Guzmán, who had been a philosophy professor at the National University of San Cristóbal de Huamanga. Which, during the 1980 elections, declined to take part in this electoral process like some left-wing political groups and, instead, chose to start a guerrilla war in the high areas surrounding Ayacucho. On May 17, 1980, on the eve of the elections, it carried out its first attack, burning ballot boxes in the town of Chuschi, in the province of Cangallo. The perpetrators were quickly apprehended and additional ballots were taken to replace the burned ones, so the elections proceeded without major incident and the event received little attention in the Peruvian press. In December, stray dogs were massacred in various Peruvian towns in protests against the reform and opening up in China.

Starting in the following years, the group intensified its campaign, advancing throughout the mountains of Peru, causing thousands of victims, including children, women, the elderly, and authorities at all levels. The president's reaction, however, was slow and hesitant: in the face of the terrorist escalation, an anti-terrorist strategy was never designed but rather a state of emergency was simply declared and the Armed Forces were sent to combat the subversives. This fact aggravated the conflict, as the military indulged in a brutal repressive campaign that also cost thousands of lives. Despite the accusations of human rights violations that came, the Belaúnde government could not stop them and generally tolerated these events.

==== Paquisha War ====
In January 1981, conflict broke out between the armies of Ecuador and Peru. When the Peruvian troops engaged the Ecuadorian Army, Ecuador denounced the event as an attack on the Ecuadorian town of Paquisha. However, Peru demonstrated that the town had not been attacked. For this reason, Ecuador was accused of building a "false Paquisha" with the intention of confusing the international community and accusing Peru of being the aggressor.

==== Politics and economy ====
Belaúnde's second term was also marked by unconditional support for Argentine forces during the Falklands War with the United Kingdom in 1982. This included several fighter aircraft and possibly Peruvian Air Force personnel, as well as ships and medical equipment. The Belaúnde government proposed a peace agreement between the two countries, but it was rejected by both parties, since both claimed absolute sovereignty of the territory. In response to Chile's support for the United Kingdom, Belaúnde called for Latin American unity.

The debt crisis in Mexico in 1982 had a profound effect on the economies of Latin America, so the countries of the region decided to rethink their economic policies. Between 1982 and 1983, the El Niño phenomenon occurred, which severely hit the northern coast of the country. Starting in 1983, the drop in metal prices began a worrying economic crisis reflected in difficulties in paying the external debt and a sharp increase in inflation and the devaluation of the sol. Inflation increased from an average of 68.21% annually between 1979 and 1982 to an average of 130.78% between 1983 and 1985. On February 1, 1985, the sol was replaced by the inti with a value of 1,000 soles, although the monetary transition concluded only in January 1986.

Additionally, a diplomatic crisis between Cuba and Peru began when six Cubans made their way into the Peruvian embassy in the country on April 1, 1980, seeking political asylum. The group gradually grew, with a total of 10,000 locals joining them over the following days, protected by the ambassador. The crisis ended when the Cuban government allowed their emigration, with 125,266 Cubans leaving the country through the Mariel boatlift.

=== Government of Alan García (1985–1990) ===
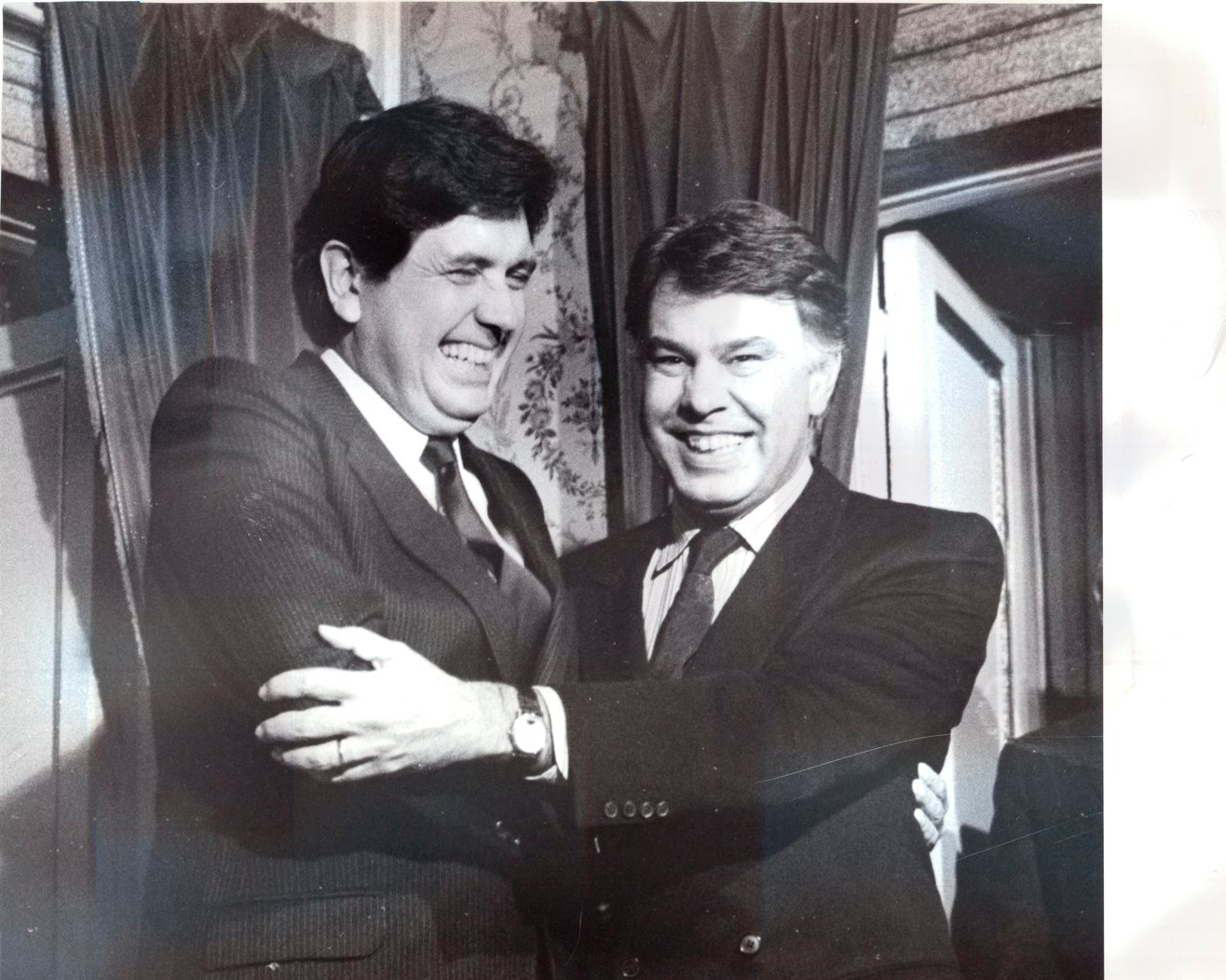
Alan García and Felipe González in 1987.

The 1985 elections put APRA in power for the first time. Alan García was elected president after the resignation of leftist politician and then mayor of Lima, Alfonso Barrantes, to a second round.

==== Politics and economy ====
With a majority in both houses of Parliament, the first years of his government are characterized by "state populism" focused on risky economic measures that brought a situation of apparent prosperity. He basically dedicated himself to subsidising products from bread to gasoline, to construction materials and so on.

==== Armed conflict ====
1986 was one of the most violent years of his presidency, as the Armed Forces put down a rebellion in a prison in Lima, in which nearly 300 rioters lost their lives. The disproportionate repression had greater international repercussion because it occurred on the eve of the 17th summit of the Socialist International, hosted at the same city.

A scandal also occurred when it was discovered that Víctor Polay Campos, former APRA member and then the top leader of the Túpac Amaru Revolutionary Movement (MRTA), escaped from prison along with members of the leadership of said terrorist group. The construction of a sophisticated tunnel intensified rumours that pointed to members of the ruling party as the authors of said escape.

==== Crisis ====
After overcoming, from 1985 to 1987, the enormous economic crisis that Belaúnde had left behind, stagnation began to occur. The greater demand of the population was not covered by the supply because there were no private investments in infrastructure. To stop the flight of foreign currency from businessmen, García announced in July 1987 the nationalisation of banking, causing panic in the financial sector. The Liberty Movement came to the political arena as the main opponent of this measure.

Immediately, Peru entered a serious economic crisis that led to historic hyperinflation (the fourth highest in the world), to the impoverishment of all sectors of the population, and to the collapse of public services. The system of generalised and indiscriminate subsidies, as well as the refusal to pay the foreign debt, closed the country's possibilities of overcoming the economic policy of the administration.

García resigned from the APRA leadership during the party's congress, adding to rumours of an early resignation or a military coup and a popular outburst over the supply crisis and the major corruption scandals of his government.

=== Government of Alberto Fujimori (1990–2000) ===
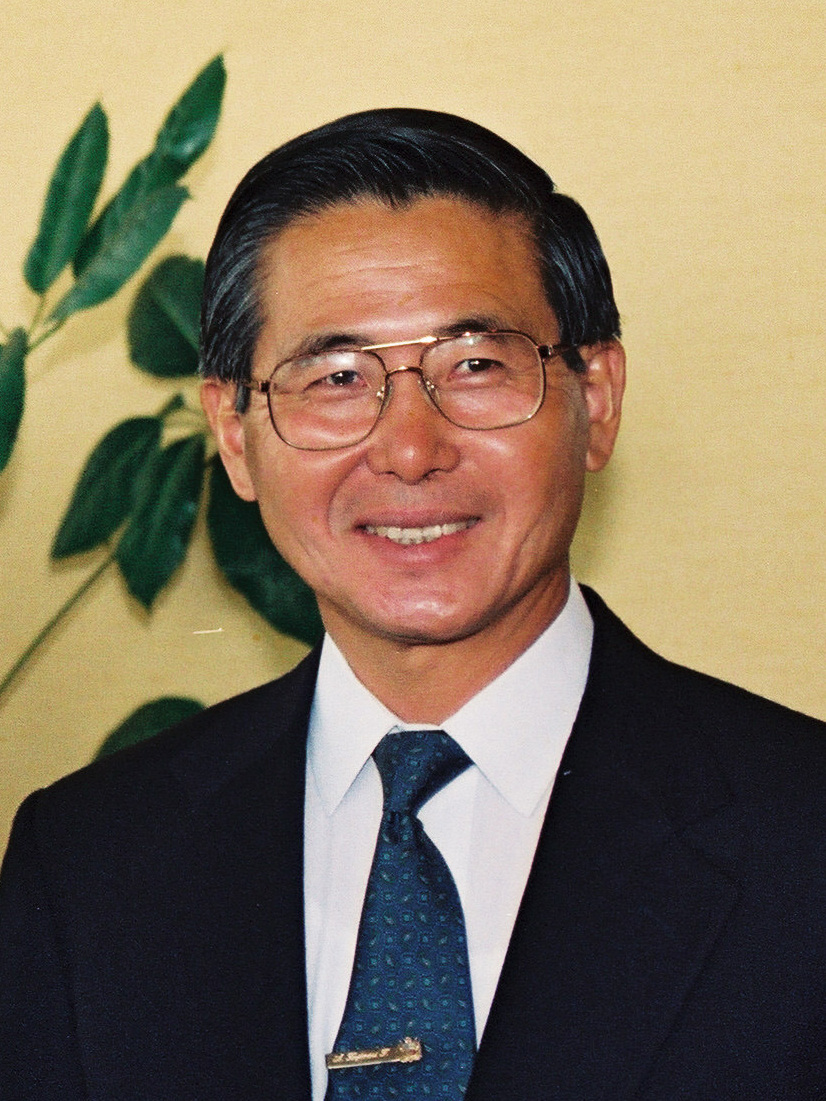
Alberto Fujimori in 1991.

==== First government ====
In the 1990 elections, Alberto Fujimori defeated the favourite candidate, Mario Vargas Llosa. APRA member Luis Alva Castro, despite the great unpopularity of the government, obtains close to 20% of the electorate, giving APRA an important presence in Parliament.

On April 5, 1992, President Fujimori shut down Congress and sent the Armed Forces to the streets, the Judiciary was intervened by the Army, political opponents were persecuted and the media were censored. These events are currently known as "the self-coup." Despite these measures, the president had popular support.

After the self-coup, elections were called for a Democratic Constituent Congress which was created by the 1993 Constitution, supported by the population through a referendum. Additionally, an attempted counter-coup was thwarted on November 13, 1992.

In September of that year, Abimael Guzmán, leader of the terrorist organization Shining Path, was captured in Surquillo, a district of Lima. This fact was a hard blow for the organization which, seeing itself beheaded, quickly lost its ability to act. The arrest followed two major terrorist attacks in the city earlier that year: that of Frecuencia 2 (a news station) and that of Tarata street (a pedestrian street in upsacle Miraflores). The year had also been marked by the executions carried out by the Grupo Colina death squad in Santa and La Cantuta, the latter having taken place after the bombing in Miraflores. The year before, it had also carried out a mass shooting in the Barrios Altos neighbourhood of Lima.

During Fujimori's administration, the State applied a series of economic measures to stop the hyperinflation inherited from the previous government. Fujimori's economic policy had an orientation of economic liberalism that led the country to its economic recovery. These measures became known as the Fujishock, a precursor to the neoliberal system that was implemented in later years.

After permissiveness with foreign investment, he negotiated the foreign debt that opened the economy to the growing globalisation that was envisioned at that time. By 1994, the country's GDP recovered to pre-crisis levels. The application of liberal policies led to the privatisation of public companies (at that time, totally inefficient), which remained in the hands of foreign transnationals, which received numerous benefits such as tax exemptions and the elimination of many legal barriers to investment.

The opening of manufacturing imports led to the restructuring of Peruvian companies to be more competitive in favour of Peruvian consumers who had been under the yoke of the monopolies of state companies. Those that wanted to continue with subsidies and monopolies disappeared thanks to the antitrust law that was passed. This situation led to the resurgence of a middle class with the ability to opt for medium and small companies that began to generate jobs, in addition to large companies that absorbed qualified labour instead of exporting it as it was for 20 years.

Union activity ceased to make sense given the resurgence of the economy, the generation of jobs demonstrated by the drop in the unemployment rate in the country and the pacification of the country, including the definitive peace signed with Ecuador.

==== Second government ====
Fujimori managed to be elected president for a second time in the 1995 elections with 53% support from the Peruvian electorate compared to 14% for the opposition candidate, the former Secretary General of the United Nations, Javier Pérez de Cuéllar. A conflict with Ecuador and an end to hostilities to sign a definitive peace treaty, the crisis of the Japanese embassy by the MRTA that attracted worldwide attention and ended violently, and the continuation of the economic policies of the previous government, marked this second period.

In 2000, Fujimori made the controversial decision to run for a third term. After a campaign marred with accusations of electoral fraud, Fujimori defeated his closest challenger, Alejandro Toledo, in the second round of the general elections in view of his withdrawal, never made official before the National Jury of Elections, carried out due to him considering that they had been fraudulent. Months later, on October 29, a military uprising led by Ollanta and Antauro Humala captured Toquepala mine, near Locumba, also denouncing the elections as fraudulent.

==== Collapse ====
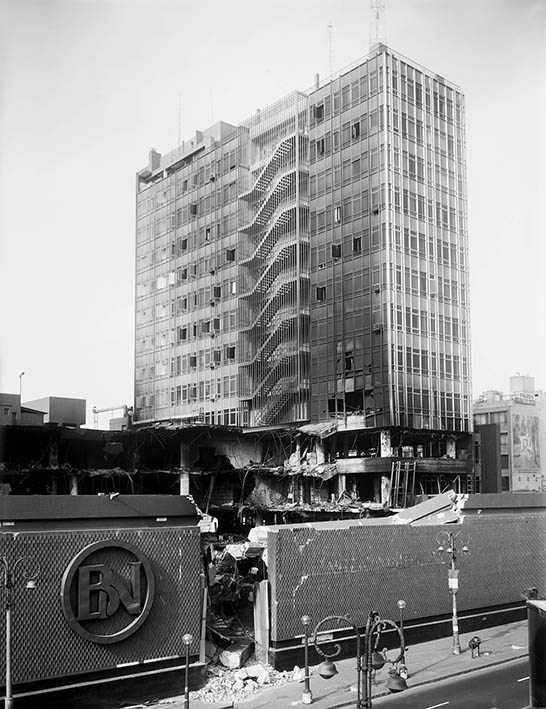
The office building destroyed by Montesinos in 2000.

Despite Fujimori's electoral victory, opponents considered it invalid and claimed the existence of electoral fraud. This led to the announcement of the Four Quarters March set for July 28 of that year, a large demonstration that sought to show the population's rejection of Fujimori's government. The demonstration was massive, but groups linked to the government instructed by one of the figures of the so-called kleptocracy, Vladimiro Montesinos, called for the execution of an anonymous destruction campaign that targeted the headquarters of the Banco de la Nación and led to the death of six people.

It is through a video released on September 14 that the existence of a vast network of corruption in the government, headed by Vladimiro Montesinos, was proven. This situation led to Montesinos' flight and Fujimori's proclamation to end his presidential mandate and call new elections in which he would not be a candidate. The first fled on a boat provided by businessman Dionisio Romero to Panama (later going to Venezuela), while the second took advantage of an official trip to resign from the presidency from Japan.

The opposition proceeded to remove the then President of Congress, Martha Hildebrandt, replacing her with Valentín Paniagua. After a long debate, Congress decided not to accept Fujimori's resignation and dismissed him by a simple majority. After the resignation of the two vice presidents, and in accordance with what is established by the constitution, Valentín Paniagua was named interim president to finish the term of Alberto Fujimori.

Paniagua, once in power, proceeded to clean up the electoral system and investigate corruption in the previous government. The Truth and Reconciliation Commission was also created to clarify the acts of violence during the war against the Shining Path. In the 2001 elections, Alejandro Toledo was elected after defeating Alan García in the second round.

== See also ==
- History of Peru
- Peruvian conflict
