= Humala (disambiguation) =

Humala may refer to:

== People ==
- Ollanta Humala (born 1963), former Peruvian president
- Antauro Humala, Peruvian military commander
- Isaac Humala (born 1936), Peruvian Pan-Americanism theorist

== Other uses ==
- Humala, Estonia, village in Harku Parish, Harju County, Estonia
- Humulus, the genus containing the hop species H. lupulus
