= Conservative left in Peru =

Political ideology within leftism in Peru

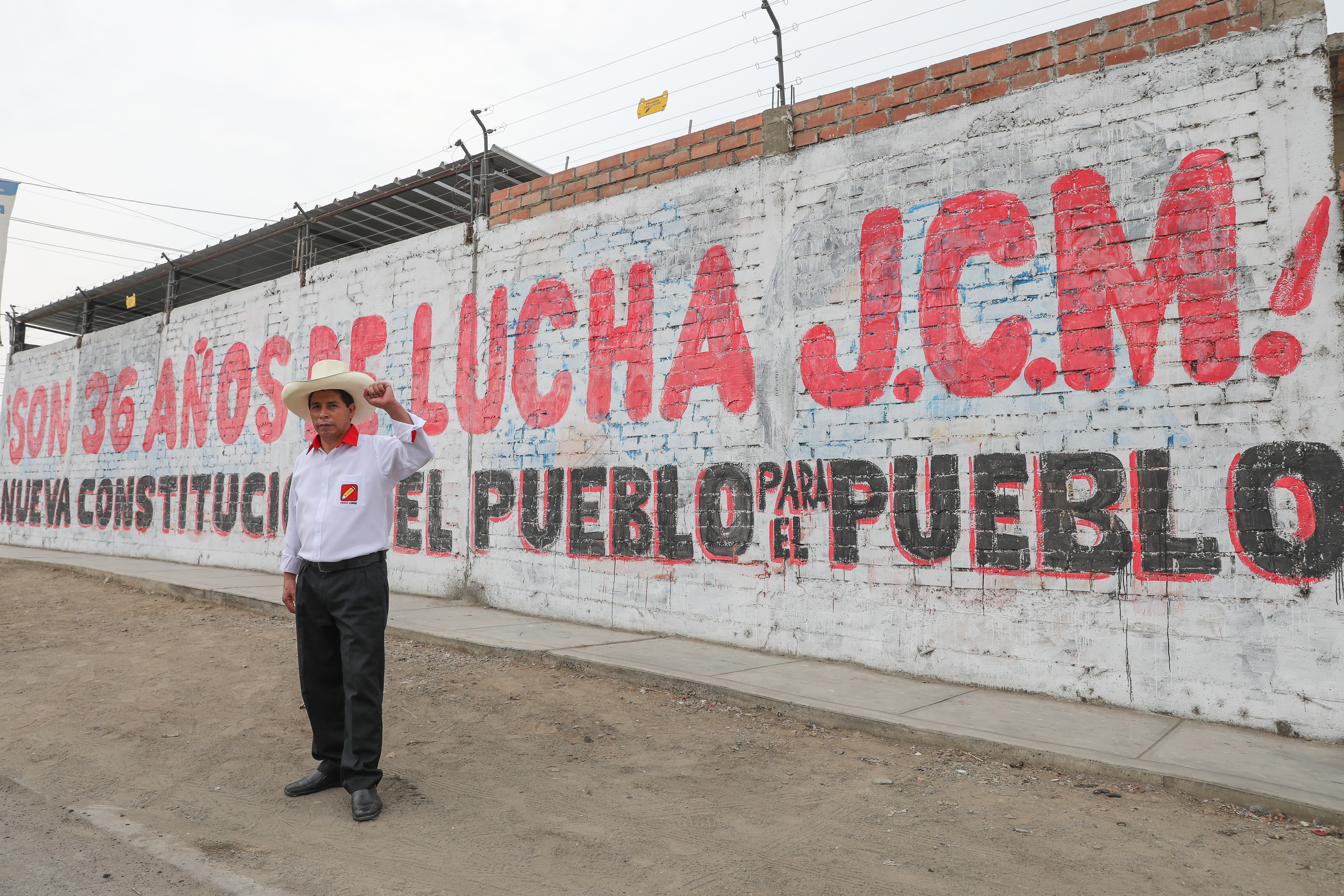
The then-candidate for Free Peru, Pedro Castillo during the campaign for the 2021 Peruvian general election, which he would go on to win. Behind Castillo is a sign in favour of constitutional reform; the then-president and his ruling party shared this view with other Peruvian left-wing groups, but not on issues such as sexual and gender minorities, or gender equality.

The "conservative left" (Spanish: "izquierda conservadora" (Note: The conservative left in Peru is referred to by various other names, such as the "popular left" and "provincial left"; ethnocacerists refer to left-conservatism as the "macho left'". Liberals and right-wing conservatives in Peru generally disparage the conservative left as the "chola left'", "terrorist-sympathizing left", "crude and thuggish left", "anti-rights left", and as the "social malcontents" or adherents of "wild populism". Adherents of left-conservatism have coalesced under labels such as "Velasquismo", "Humalismo", "Antaurismo", "Cerronismo", and "Castillismo".)) is an umbrella term that refers to left-wing political groups in Peru whose ideology is socially conservative and departs from more progressive social positions in this sense, giving priority to more economic aspects.

These terms are linked to the Andean region of the country and are used to differentiate from the other part of the left, which generally defends civil liberties, with which they have often been in rivalry since the 2010s, as is the case between Vladimir Cerrón and Verónika Mendoza.

== Background ==
The conservatism of the Peruvian left dates back to the 20th century, when the country was immersed in moderate civilian reformism and adopted some ideas from the Nueva Izquierda. During the regime of Juan Velasco Alvarado (1968–1975), the Fuerzas Armadas carried out reforms that were not universally popular and had authoritarian overtones. Eric Hobsbawm described it as a peculiar revolution. David Scott Palmer described it as a reformist experiment of a conservative and bureaucratic nature. Abraham F. Lowenthal said that it also had an "ambiguity" because its revolutionary rhetoric was contradictory to, or even incongruous with, its political practice. Velasco Alvarado was succeeded by Francisco Morales Bermúdez. Pablo Macera commented that "in Peruvian history there has always been a left-wing tendency, in unequal combat with conservative tendencies." Therefore, he added, in the last years of the century, "those leftist groups that interpreted and adopted the interests of these sectors" deviated towards a "deviant" solution towards the informal economy, which he called "shady or underhanded capitalism".

Around the beginning of the 1980s, when Víctor Raúl Haya de la Torre died, the legacy of the veteran American Popular Revolutionary Alliance was contested by two factions, one of which was led by Andrés Townsend. A peaceful solution was planned in which representatives of both positions would participate in the United Left coalition for the 1980 Peruvian general election. However, the solution failed, and Townsend left APRA to form the Hayist Bases Movement, which joined the Democratic Convergence coalition for the 1985 elections, in which he was elected to Congress.

In the 1990s, part of the political left supported the government of Alberto Fujimori, amidst the crisis of political parties at the time. Subsequently, some Latin American countries entered a period of "lost decade" between 1998 and 2002, due to the economic stagnation of governments implementing neoliberalism, including in Peru. Political scientist Daniel Zovatto noted that the phenomenon ended with a shift to the left and center-left in several countries.

The Humala family entered Peruvian politics through Andean nationalist movements. This led to the formation of the Ethnocacerist and Peruvian Nationalist Party, in which the Humala family participated. Avanza País, founded by Pedro Cenas Casamayor, included Ulises Humala as its leader.

In 2006, Mirko Lauer considered that the population's complaints regarding the promises made by Alejandro Toledo, during the last year of his government, had motivated the emergence of new movements of Andean origin.

== Uses of the term ==
=== Humala family as representatives ===
"We cannot be conservative; we must move forward so that we can generate jobs and get the economy moving, so that Peru will always be an attractive market for future investments"

— Ollanta Humala responding to Radio Programas del Perú about the social aspects of his government in 2011

The adoption of the concept of conservative left occurred in the mid-2010s. Previously, the Spanish newspaper El Mundo noted in 2010 that a new Peruvian left existed and that regional movements were gaining public support in the regional and municipal elections of that year, in which National Solidarity and Popular Force chose not to participate.

Ollanta Humala assumed the presidency of the Republic in 2011, promoting investment in some social programs, education, health, and defense; however, his positions were not significantly progressive compared to other countries during the "Pink tide" across Latin America. The Economist described him as a "man of the left who had governed like a conservative" for betraying his ideological principles after running in the 2011 general election. Javier Diez Canseco noted that he had distanced himself from the support of popular sectors and political figures such as Alejandro Toledo. Analyst Félix Reátegui indicated that the State had prioritized the exploitation of natural resources to maintain the country's stability, but this measure had generated economic asymmetries and growing social discontent. Fujimorist leader Keiko Fujimori supported the cabinet changes of Ollanta Humala due to the protests against him and stated that she "was committed to governability".

Ollanta Humala was an important figure in the 21st-century conservative movement long before the Peruvian political crisis began in 2016,according to political scientist Rodrigo Gil Piedra, who described it as a stage of "embryonic politicization". His family was connected to ethnocacerism, an ideological current that the Página/12 website described in 2006 as "a combination of homophobia, xenophobia, antisemitism, and militarism". With Humala's rise to prominence, the figure of Gregorio Santos, regional governor of Cajamarca between 2011 and 2014, also emerged, who was also described as "conservative left-wing.

The ethnocacerist leader Antauro Humala has been described as a figure who uses "a radical left-conservative discourse, with "fascistoides" traits and promises of a hardline, militarist approach and a foundational discourse with extreme radicalism," according to Peruvian analyst Carlos Meléndez. Ulises Humala differentiated between the two political figures in his family: Antauro was closer to the radical nationalist ideas of Isaac Humala, while Ollanta chose to form his own party, the Peruvian Nationalist Party, since he believed that voters did not want "radical option".

The Union for Peru party, which held congressional representation during the 2020-2021 term and was led by Antauro Humala, was considered "conservative left". During the elections for that supplementary term, an alliance was announced between the New Peru, led by Verónika Mendoza, and Free Peru, led by Vladimir Cerrón. Verónika Mendoza did not enjoy a good reputation among the conservative Andean population, according to Alfredo Torres of Ipsos Perú. In that context, then-former president Ollanta Humala accused Verónika Mendoza, the leader of New Peru and a key member of Together for Peru, of co-governing in the transitional government of Francisco Sagasti by placing many members of these organizations in positions of power, such as Óscar Ugarte in the Ministry of Health.

The announcement by New Peru prompted the resignation of the LGBT community and feminists from the party, as they stated that "the leadership has decided to ally itself with one of the most conservative parties, Free Peru, which despises our lives and one of the tools that can help us live with dignity: the gender perspective". This came after Cerrón, the party's presidential candidate, declared in 2016 that "as a left-wing party, we respect the private lives of each of them [the LGBT community]. What we cannot tolerate is the adoption of people who do not choose that cultural pattern, which is not the norm in Peru". In 2019, when he was regional governor of Junín, he had announced the implementation of an educational curriculum for the region without a gender perspective and commented on his social media: "Our people, full of family values, will never be able to accept it". As a result, New Peru broke its alliance with Free Peru and established ties with Together for Peru, led by Yehude Simon.

=== Pedro Castillo and Vladimir Cerrón as new representatives ===
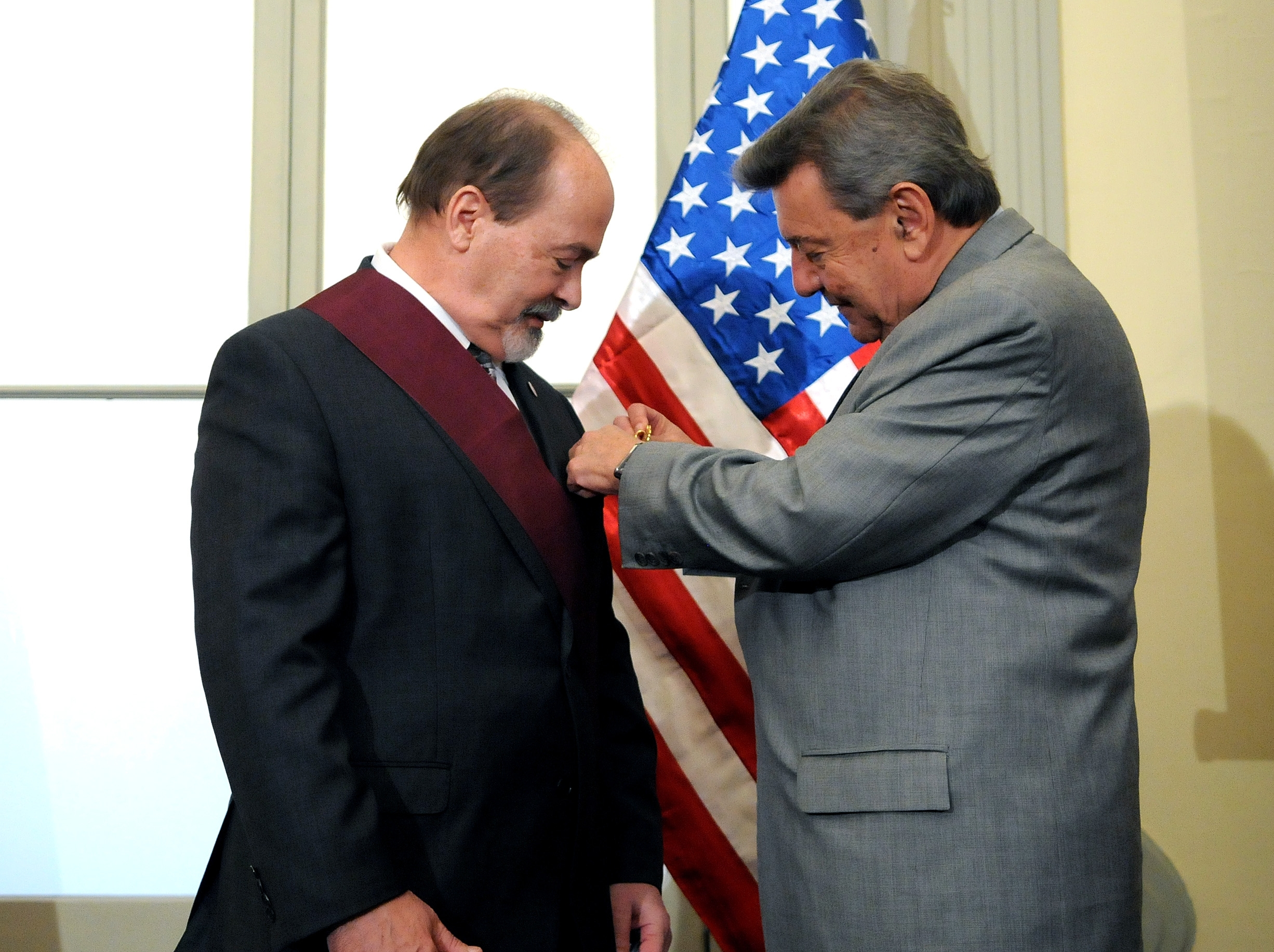
Awarding of a medal by then-Foreign Minister Rafael Roncagliolo to the director of USAID Perú Richard Goughnour in 2011. The conservative left associates this US government agency with caviarismo and US imperialism in the country.

In 2021, Pedro Castillo had become a prominent figure on the provincial left, enjoying the support of his constituents in the Peruvian Andes. During the 2021 Peruvian general election, the then-candidate for Free Peru identified himself as a "Profamilia teacher" and asserted that the two go hand in hand. He was described as a left-wing candidate with conservative tendencies, with proposals labeled populist b Ojo Público and El Español. According to historian Daniel Parodi of Antonio Ruiz de Montoya University, the president adopted a rather conservative and misogynistic Andean worldview. Vladimír Cerrón did not run in the presidential elections due to legal issues.

"We have to tell boys and girls, there are little girls with penises and vaginas, there are little boys with penises and vaginas, where are we, comrades? We have to repudiate that attitude, we have to throw all that idiosyncrasy in the trash"

— Pedro Castillo responding to the question of trans people in Peru during the 2021 election.

In the midst of the second round, the forces of Free Peru, also described as "conservative left," managed to reach an agreement with the "progressive left" (described by Cerrón as "caviares") to confront the right-wing candidacy of Keiko Fujimori. After Castillo's victory, Vladimir Cerrón was clear that "the country is preparing to be led by the left, and not just any left, but by the popular, chola, rebellious, plebeian left". The economist specializing in sustainable development, Hugo Cabieses, commented that Castillo's election was "the revenge of the conservative sectors of the left".

In the early years of his administration, Pedro Castillo's cabinet was described as "a conservative, traditional, and 'anachronistic' left-wing government " due to the presence of figures such as Héctor Béjar and Ciro Gálvez in ministerial positions. Soon, the so-called "conservative left" clashed with its counterpart, the "progressive left," accusing the latter of having "captured President Pedro Castillo".

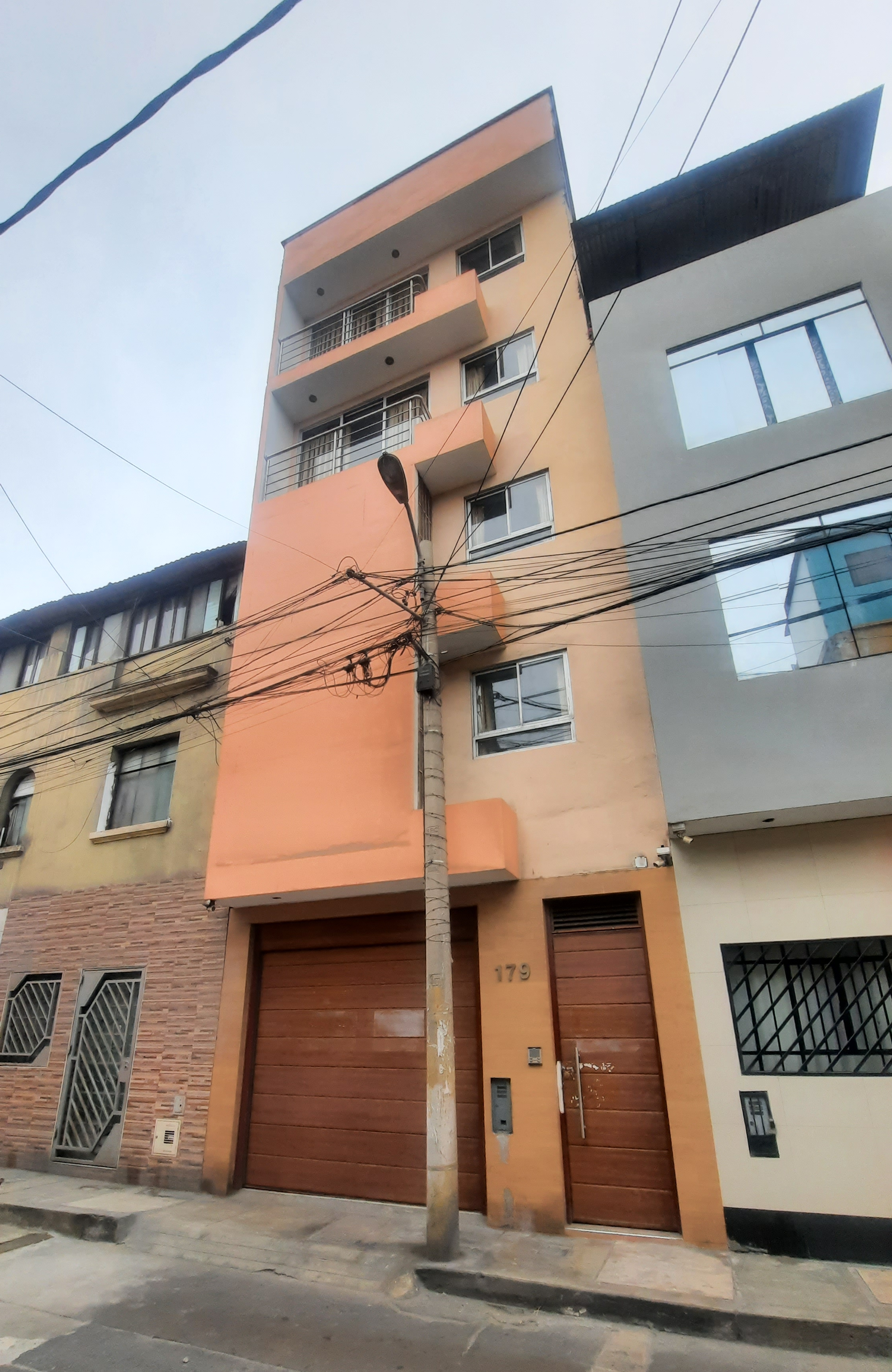
In 2022, news outlets reported that several evangelical movements, including the leader of "Con mis hijos no te metas", had met with Pedro Castillo at Sarratea's house due to their shared conservative affinity for preventing any changes to the student curriculum that would limit evangelical influence on the education of minors regarding sexual diversity and gender studies.

By February 2022, the split between the two left-wing factions was formalized with the progressive sector's departure from the government and its move to the opposition following the resignation of Pedro Francke and Anahí Durand from their ministerial posts and the subsequent appointment of Katy Ugarte as Minister of Women in the cabinet of Héctor Valer, despite Ugarte's opposition to the gender perspective during the election campaign. Both Valer's cabinet and the subsequent one under Aníbal Torres were characterized as conservative.

By June of the same year, Castillo resigned from Free Peru and governed as an independent after distancing himself from Cerrón. Free Peru congresswoman, Kelly Portalatino, accused Pedro Castillo of having right-wing and centrist advisors who "make governance look bad". La Encerrona journalist, Jonathan Castro Cajahuanca, described Free Peru's betrayal of Castillo as having waged "more dirty war online against LGBT+ discourse" than the far-right, ultraconservative Popular Renewal. Free Peru received an invitation from one of its members and Vladimir's brother, Waldemar Cerrón, to join the Democratic Bloc coalition; while organizing parliamentary sessions to promote Cerrón for the upcoming 2026 presidential elections.

Following Castillo's attempted self-coup in December 2022 and the subsequent social upheaval, groups identified with the conservative and populist left demanded Castillo's reinstatement as president, after he had been third impeachment of Pedro Castillo, and rejected the notion that Castillo had staged a self-coup. These groups differed from progressive groups, who accepted that he had indeed carried out a self-coup. Dina Boluarte, Castillo's former vice president, distanced herself from the left-wing political platform of her candidacy and, during her administration, aligned herself with conservative positions, primarily from the political right. As a result, the political right eliminated all references to provincialism within its circles of power. Castillo criticized treaties "against the rights of the country" such as UNCLOS, agreeing with business associations, and accused Dina Boluarte of provoking a "crime of treason" when she signed an apparently similar one, the High Seas Treaty.

Following the suspension of USAID activities by President Donald Trump, Cerrón declared in 2025 through X that "two types of left operate in Peru: the USAID left (referring to progressives) and the popular left (referring to Free Peru and similar leftist movements). Cerrón attempted to link Verónika Mendoza and her party as "highly dependent" on NGOs linked to USAID and alleged that they "receive advice, employment, and possibly funding," although there is no evidence to support this. Waldemar Cerrón, for his part, published an article entitled "The Ideology of the New Popular Left", in which he proclaimed Free Peru as representative of this ideology.

In 2026, Congressman José María Balcázar of Free Peru, temporarily assumed the presidency. Vladimir Cerrón, who remained in hiding while attempting to run in 2026 Peruvian general election, claimed that his party had broken away from Popular Force and urged Balcázar to carry out the planned actions during his transitional government. Balcázar responded by disassociating himself from Free Peru and appointing Hernando de Soto as Prime Minister. Although de Soto's candidacy for prime minister failed, and Denisse Miralles, took his place, her cabinet was accused of being pressured by Cerrón to change it, according to Balcázar himself, though the latter dismissed this as just a "joke". Cerrón later claimed to have a close friendship with the then-president.

== Other applications ==
The perception of social conservatism on the political left also leans towards radical groups like the Shining Path. Gonzalo Thought is one of the doctrines with authoritarian features that Shining Path promoted while carrying out cleansing against sexual minorities and ignoring feminism. urthermore, the radical group affected the image of indigenism in Peru and replaced it with a peasant class aligned with the goals of the traditional left.

In the case of the conservative right, Fujimorism also sympathizes with ideas based on the political left: due to the rejection of the neoliberal legacy of Alberto Fujimori. His daughter Keiko promised social welfare programs if she won the elections. Pedro Castillo coined the term "Fujicerronism" to refer to a possible alliance between the Free Peru and Popular Force parties that the diplomatic conflict with Mexico and other countries that do not share the alliance's ideals. Congressman Roberto Sánchez of Juntos por el Perú has called himself Pedro Castillo's "ideological heir.

== See also ==
- Left-conservatism
- Liberalism in Peru
- Conservatism in Peru
- Neoliberalism in Peru
  - Conservatism in Peru (21st century)
- Relations between Pedro Castillo and the extreme left in Peru
- Politics of Peru
