= 1992 Peruvian coup attempt =

1992 coup d'état attempt in Peru

- Part of the Fujimorazo
Date	13 November 1992
Location	Lima, Peru
Result	Plot foiled, arrests of conspirators

Belligerents
Government of Peru	Insurrect soldiers

Commanders and leaders
Alberto Fujimori	Jaime Salinas Sedó; José Pastor Vives; Víctor Obando Salas

The 1992 Peruvian coup d'état attempt was an attempted coup d'état planned to take place on November 13, 1992, by a group of soldiers from the Peruvian Army, Air Force and Navy, headed by retired general Jaime Salinas Sedó. It was a response to the self-coup of April 5 carried out by Alberto Fujimori, which led to the establishment of an emergency government. The plot intended to return democracy to the country.

== Background ==
After the self-coup carried out on Sunday, April 5, by the then president of Peru, Alberto Fujimori, with the support of the Armed Forces, the resulting government, called the Government of Emergency and National Reconstruction, dissolved or intervened in the democratic institutions, alleging the parliamentary blockade, the ineffectiveness of the Judiciary and the terrorist threat of the subversive groups Shining Path and Túpac Amaru Revolutionary Movement.

This regime consolidated its power thanks to the successful operation to capture Abimael Guzmán, leader of Shining Path, and his leadership, and the political repression of the opposition. Added to this was the end of pressure from the Organisation of American States for the violation of democratic legality thanks to the convocation of the Democratic Constituent Congress.

== Coup ==
The military conspirators, led by retired generals Jaime Salinas Sedó, José Pastor Vives and Víctor Ernesto Obando Salas, planned an operation under the protection of the right to insurrection enshrined in the 1979 Constitution. Salinas and his allies did not intend to take power, but rather to restore democratic order and hand over command of the nation to Máximo San Román, then president by constitutional succession but not recognised.

The plan was to arrest Alberto Fujimori, Nicolás Hermoza Ríos, head of the Joint Command of the Armed Forces, and presidential advisor Vladimiro Montesinos at dawn. But on November 12, the plot was revealed and the operations were cancelled. Fujimori, upon learning of the coup, sought refuge in the Japanese embassy in Lima and ordered the arrest of the 25 high-ranking conspirators, without a court order. Some of the rebellious soldiers suffered torture and illegal detention.

== Aftermath ==
In March 1993, the twenty-five military conspirators were sentenced by a military court to eight years in prison for the crime of rebellion and attempted murder against President Fujimori. In May, eleven of them were pardoned. Those who were not amnestied served their sentence first in the Castro Castro Prison and were then transferred to the Real Felipe Fortress until they could benefit from the 1995 Amnesty Law.

On March 15, 2001, by Law 27436, they were reincorporated into active service. Subsequently, the Inter-American Commission on Human Rights requested the annulment of the sentences, but the Military Court refused and only declared the sentence extinguished due to prescription in 2010.

In 2004, the Congress of the Republic approved the opinion of the Ministry of Defence, in which 26 officers of the Armed Forces participating in the countercoup were promoted. In December 2004, some other officers participating in the 1992 countercoup and the Locumbazo were invited to retire, which was requested by Antauro Humala in the Andahuaylazo.

== See also ==
- 1992 Peruvian self-coup
- Anti-Fujimorism
