= Andahuaylas uprising =

2005 attempted coup d'état in Peru

Andahuaylazo
- Part of the Internal conflict in Peru
Date	1–4 January 2005
Location	Andahuaylas, Peru (Note: Some 100 supporters of the movement were also reported to be present in Arequipa.)
Action	Rebellion: Armed confrontations with law enforcement; Kidnapping of police officers; Power outages
Result	Government victory: Humala is arrested on January 3rd; Rebels surrender on January 4th

Belligerents
Government of Peru: Peruvian Police; DINOES	Ethnocacerists; Retired armed forces members Local supporters

Commanders and leaders
Alejandro Toledo; Félix Murazzo; José Williams	Antauro Humala (POW); Marco Vizcarra (surrendered)

Strength
300+ DINOES members	160 reservists and ethnocacerists 1,000+ locals (3–4 Jan)

Casualties and losses
4 killed 5 wounded	2 killed 9 wounded 165 captured

The Andahuaylas uprising, better known in Peru as the Andahuaylazo, was a military uprising that took place in the Peruvian city of Andahuaylas and was led by the retired Peruvian Army major Antauro Humala, who, leading 160 reservists, demanded the resignation of then-President Alejandro Toledo among other key objectives. It took place between January 1 and 4, 2005, ending with the capture of Antauro Humala and the surrender of his followers.

The rebels had the objective of transforming power, through the implementation of major reforms, since they wanted a transitional government under a constituent assembly with the command of different leaders, who, according to the rebels, would have changed the lifestyle of the population and the Peruvian state system itself.

== Background ==
Brothers Ollanta and Antauro Humala, officers of the Peruvian Army and followers of the principles of ethnocacerism outlined by their father, lawyer Isaac Humala, began to gain public notoriety when they led an uprising in Locumba against the government of Alberto Fujimori, then in its final stages, on October 29, 2000. After being arrested and prosecuted for rebellion, sedition and insulting their superior, they were released and amnestied by Congress, already under the transitional government of Valentín Paniagua, on December 21, 2000.

Subsequently, during the mandate of Alejandro Toledo, Ollanta Humala was appointed as a deputy to the Peruvian military attaché in France, in January 2003, and then as a military attaché to the Peruvian Embassy in South Korea, in June 2004. Meanwhile, Antauro Humala launched himself on a mission to oppose the government of Toledo, demanding his resignation and his submission to a "residence trial." Due to his weekly publication's tone against the Peruvian Armed Forces, accusing them of being part of a "Fujimorist mafia", he received support from many followers of ethnocacerism.

By December 2004, reports from the General Intelligence Directorate of the Ministry of the Interior already warned about the initial movements of Antauro Humala's ethnocacerist reservists in Andahuaylas. Despite this, then-Interior Minister Javier Reátegui ignored the warnings.

== Timeline ==
=== Day 1 ===
The main police station of Andahuaylas staffed 80 troops on a normal day. However, due to the New Year's celebrations, only 10 officers were manning the post on January 1. At 4:25 in the morning of January 1, 2005, Antauro Humala, in command of 160 unarmed reservists (many of them veterans of the Cenepa War and of the internal conflict) entered the city through Peru Avenue and captured the police command, after a weak and short resistance by the few police officers, it is said that in reality the number of reservists was around 300, but they were hidden in strategic areas.

The ethnocaceristas seized 80 HK-G3 rifles, 4 shotguns, 29 war grenades, 11 pistols, 800 tear gas canisters and 50,000 bullet cartridges, as well as 2 police patrol cars, and in the words of Antauro himself, "5 manzanas from the city of Andahuaylas." During the day, a small police patrol returned to the headquarters and tried to regain control of the post. It was during this confrontation that 5 police officers and 2 reservists were injured. 17 police officers and soldiers were taken hostage, who were displayed to the locals.

=== Day 2 ===
At 5 in the morning of January 2, 2005, the rebels ambushed a patrol car of the Green Squadron of the Peruvian Police near the police station, reportedly killing police officers Carlos Cahuana Pacheco, Luis Chávez Vásquez, Ricardo Rivera Fernández and Abelardo Cerrón Carbajal. According to the only survivor of the attack, Humala reportedly exclaimed to his hosts: "We have killed four state dogs!" (Note: In 2015, a report from the Criminalistics Directorate of the Peruvian National Police indicated that the bullets that caused the officers' death came from a place opposite from the group, alluding to police snipers located at nearby Huayhuaca hill on the orders of Otto Guibovich as the possible perpetrators.)

Toledo and Reátegui, who were vacationing in northern Punta Sal, were forced to return to Lima to deal with the situation. As such, over 300 members of the National Division of Special Operations (DINOES) were ordered to the scene and a state of emergency was declared. An ultimatum was also given to the rebels.

=== Day 3 ===
On January 3, more than a thousand locals marched into the main square, led by Humala. At first it was thought that Humala would surrender, but that did not happen. The leader of the riot met with General Félix Murazzo of the Police. When Antauro returned triumphantly to the police station, some bullets killed a reservist and injured two more of them and also two civilians. However, when negotiating his surrender, Humala was arrested in the Municipality of Andahuaylas.

=== Day 4 ===
The uprising came to an end after the 150 rebels who retreated to the police station after Humala's arrest surrendered to the local police after receiving a letter by Humala that indicated they should put their weapons down. Humala was then imprisoned at the Piedras Gordas prison, later being transferred to a military prison in Chorrillos and then Ancón II until the end of his sentence.
