= Indigenous peoples of Peru =

Peruvian people of indigenous ancestry

Native Peruvians
Peruanos nativos (Spanish)
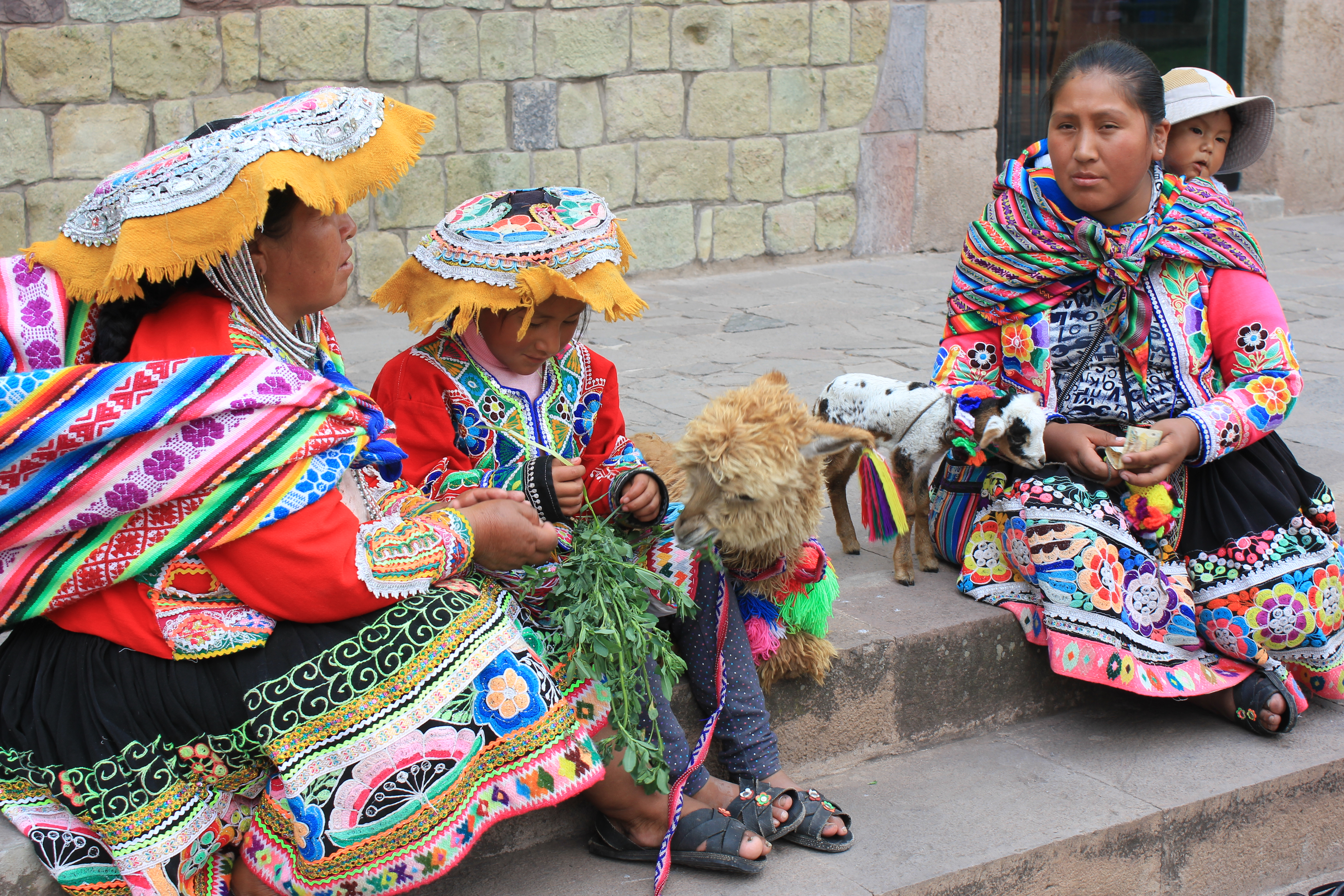
- Quechua people in the city of Cusco, former capital of the Inca Empire

Total population
- Amerindian ancestry predominates ▲6,783,697 (2025 census) ▼20.7% of the Peruvian population

Regions with significant populations
- Mainly in southern regions and in the Peruvian Amazon (Apurímac, Ayacucho, Huancavelica, Cusco, Puno, Loreto, Junín, Pasco, Huánuco, Ucayali, and Madre de Dios).

Languages
- Spanish • Indigenous languages (including Quechua, Aymara, Asháninka, Aguaruna)

Religion
- Catholicism · Indigenous religion

Related ethnic groups
- Indigenous peoples of the Americas

Indigenous peoples of Peru (Spanish: Pueblos indígenas del Perú), also known as Native Peruvians (Spanish: Peruanos nativos), are a large number of ethnic groups who inhabit territory in present-day Peru. Indigenous cultures developed here for thousands of years before the arrival of the Spanish in 1532.

In 2025, 6,783,697 Peruvians identified themselves as Indigenous peoples and formed about 20.7% of the total population of Peru. At the time of the Spanish arrival, the Indigenous peoples of the rain forest of the Amazon basin to the east of the Andes were mostly semi-nomadic tribes; they subsisted on hunting, fishing, gathering and slash and burn agriculture. Those peoples living in the Andes and to the west were dominated by the Inca Empire, who had a complex, hierarchical civilization. It developed many cities, building major temples and monuments with techniques of highly skilled stone-masonry.

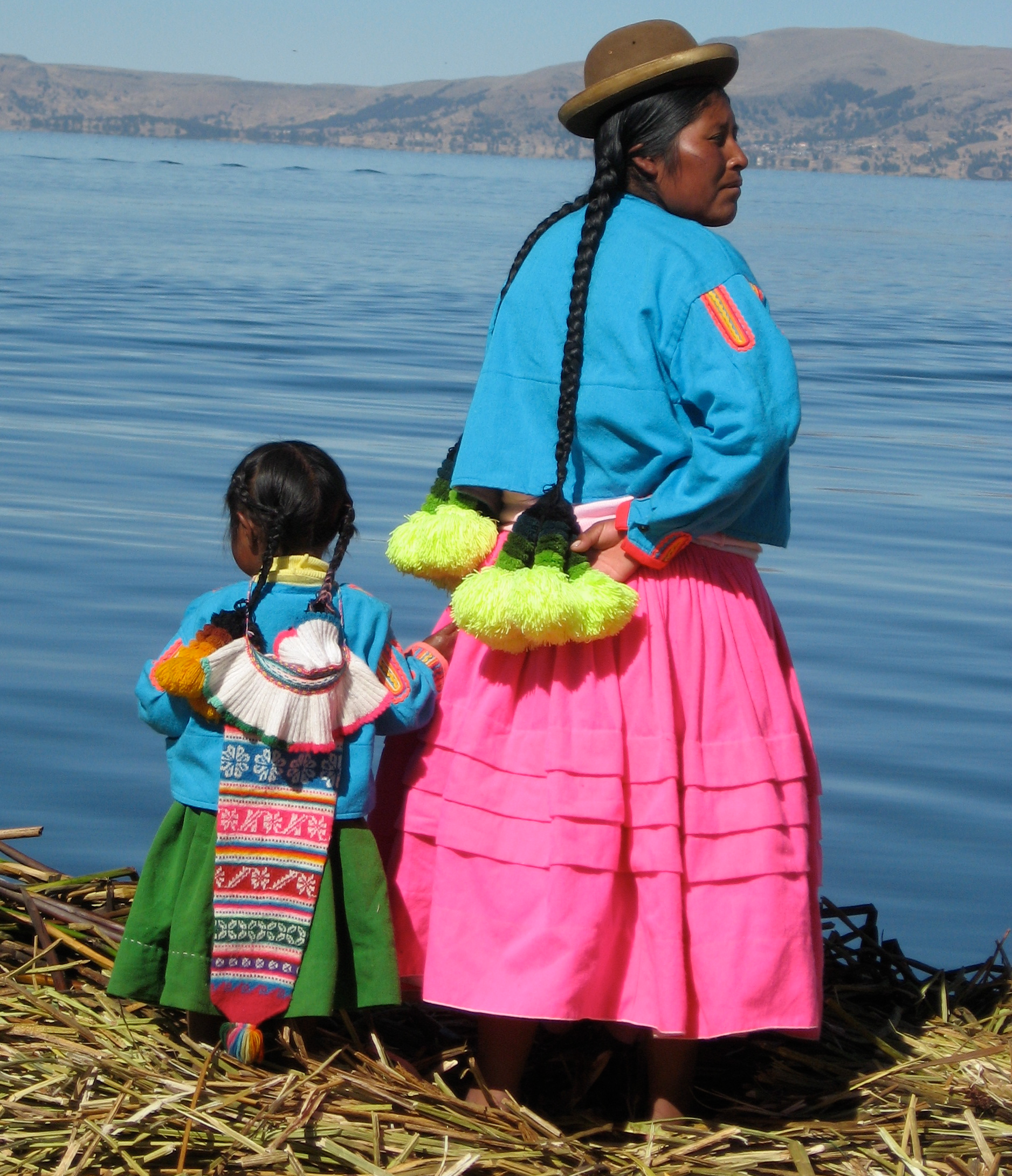
A Native Peruvian mother and daughter from the Urus islands.

Many of the estimated 2000 nations and tribes present in 1500 died out as a consequence of the expansion and consolidation of the Inca Empire and its successor after 1533, the Spanish Empire. In the 21st century, the mixed-race mestizos are the largest component of the Peruvian population.

With the arrival of the Spanish, many Natives perished due to Eurasian infectious diseases among the foreigners, to which they had acquired no immunity.

All of the Peruvian Indigenous groups, such as the Urarina, and even those who live isolated in the most remote areas of the Amazon rainforest, such as the Matsés, Matis, and Korubo, have changed their ways of life to some extent under the influence of European-Peruvian culture. They have adopted the use of firearms and other manufactured items, and trade goods, although they remain separated from mainstream Peruvian society. Many Indigenous groups work to uphold traditional cultural practices and identities.

== Origins ==
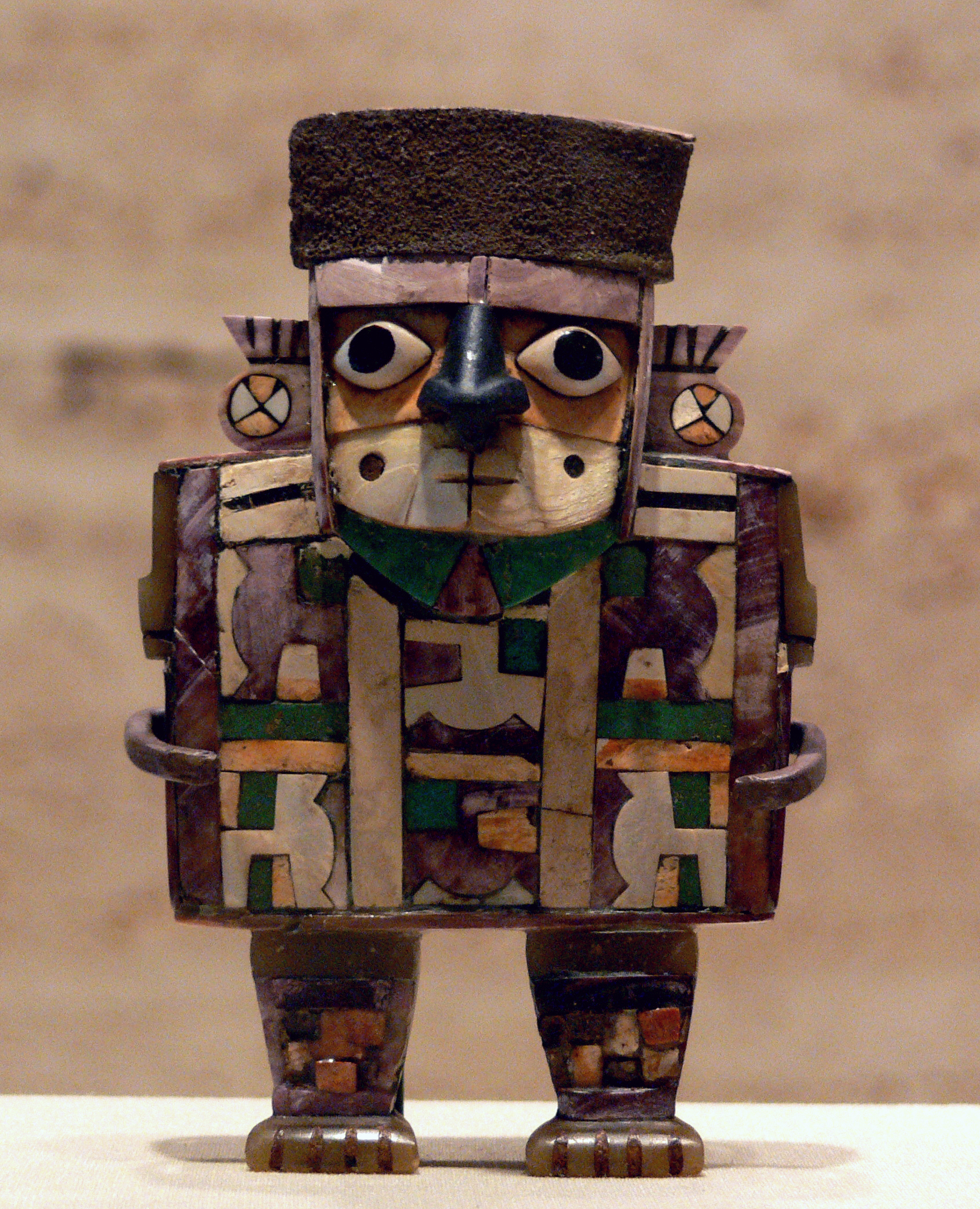
Wari culture sculpture, c. 600–1000 CE, wood with shell-and-stone inlay and silver, Kimbell Art Museum.

Anthropological and genetic evidence indicates that most of the original population of the Americas descended from migrants from North Asia (Siberia) who entered North America across the Bering Strait in at least three separate waves. DNA analysis has shown that most of those resident in Peru in 1500 were descended from the first wave of Asian migrants, who are theorized, but not proven conclusively, to have crossed Beringia at the end of the last glacial period during the Upper Paleolithic, around 24,000 BCE. Migrants from that first wave are thought to have reached Peru in the 10th millennium BC, probably entering the Amazon basin from the northwest.

The Norte Chico civilization of Peru is the oldest known civilization in the Americas and one of the six sites where civilization, including the development of agriculture and government, separately originated in the ancient world. The sites, located 100 miles (160 km) north of Lima, developed a trade between coastal fisherman and cotton growers and built monumental pyramids around the 30th century BC.

During the pre-Columbian era, the peoples who dominated the territory now known as Peru spoke languages, such as: Quechua, Aymara, Jivaroan, Tsimané, Tallán, Culli, Quingnam, Muchik, and Puquina. The peoples had different social and organizational structures, and distinct languages and cultures.

== Demographics ==
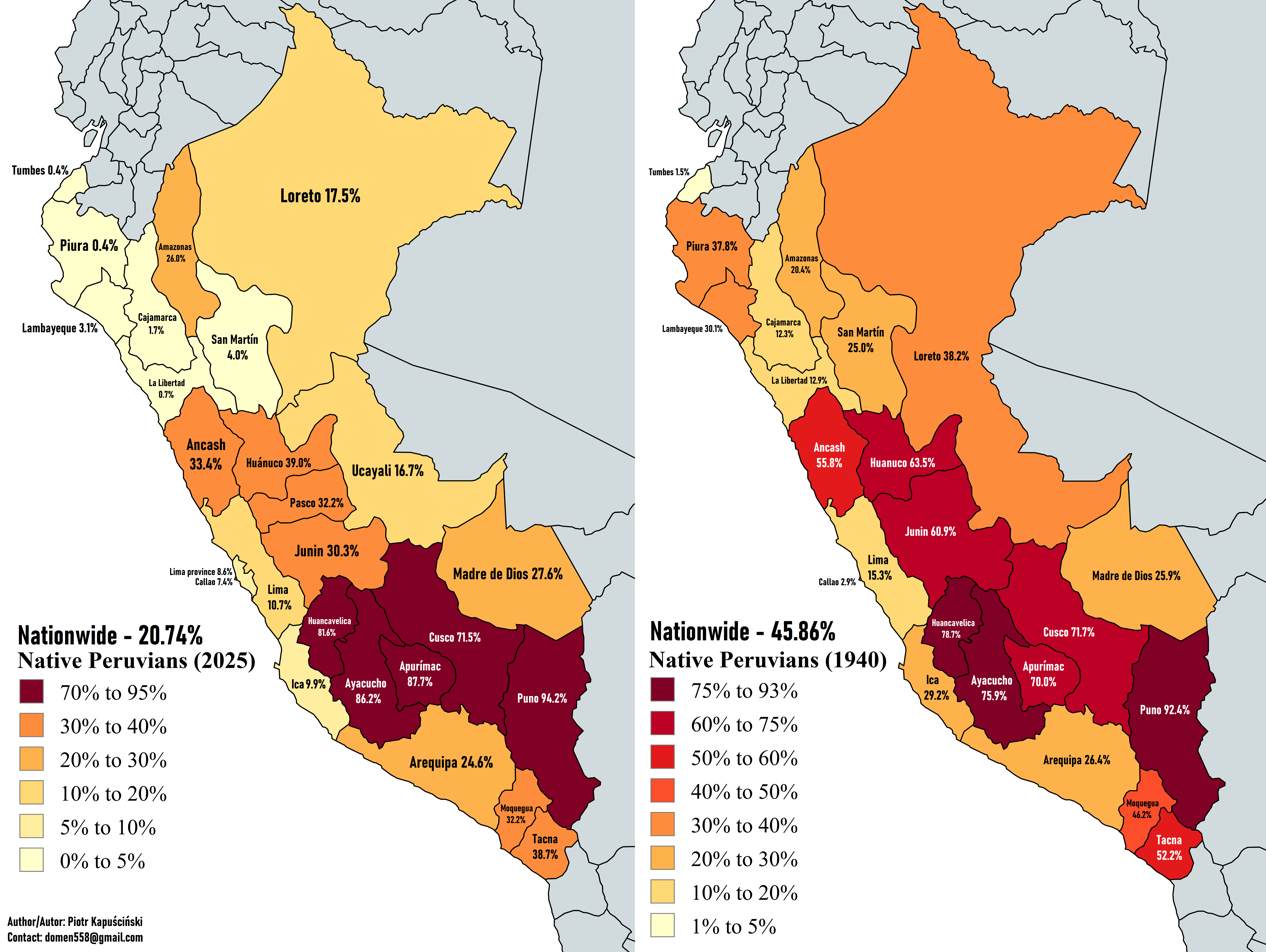
Map of Native Peruvians according to the censuses of 2025 and 1940

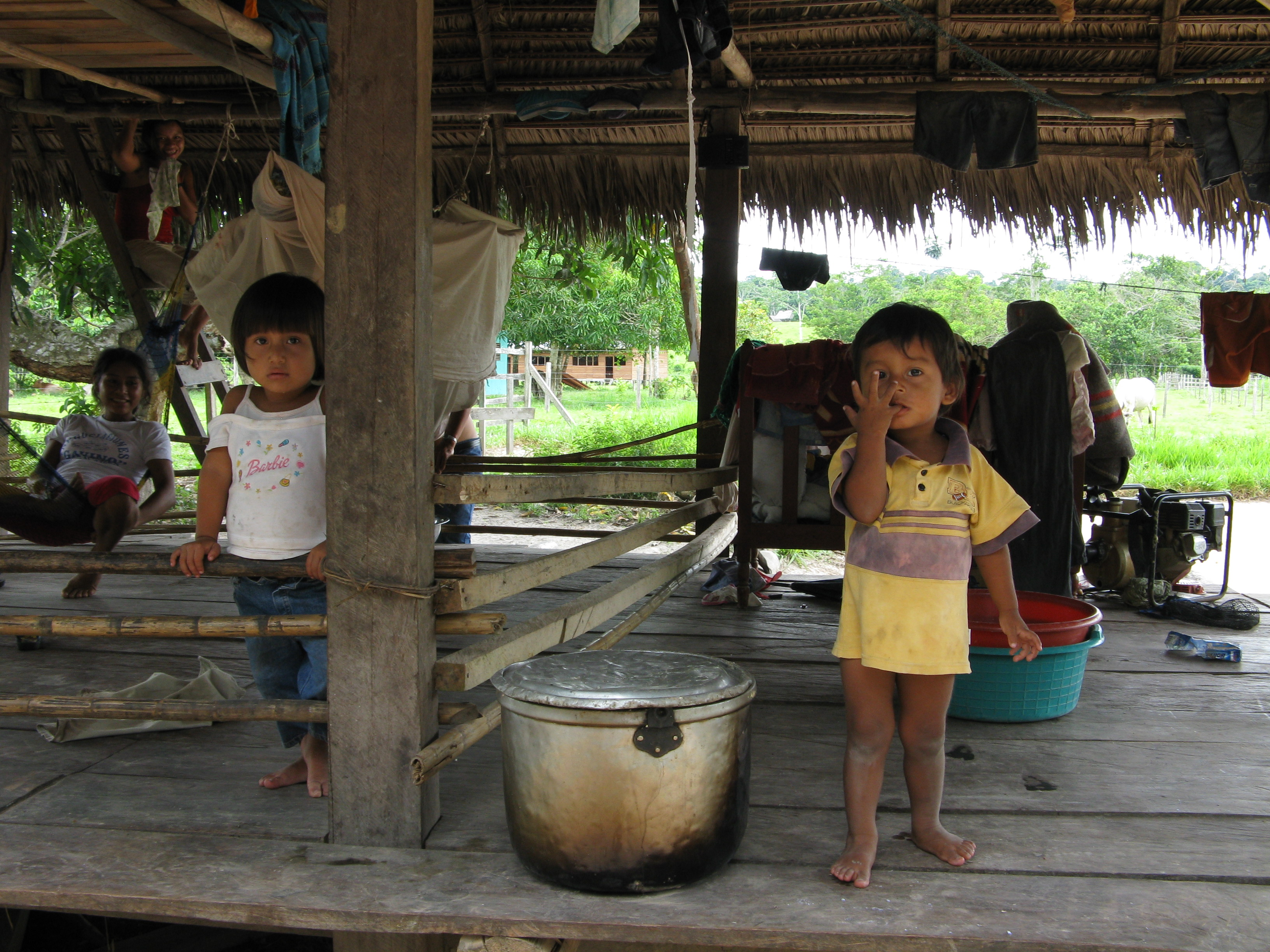
Ashaninka children in a town in Huánuco.

According to Peru's 2025 census, out of a 34,157,732 population, the Indigenous people in Peru represent about 20.7%, of those, 92.3% are Andean and 7.3% are Amazonian.

In the Amazonian region, there more than 65 ethnic groups classified into 16 language families. After Brazil in South America and New Guinea in Oceania, Peru is believed to have the highest number of uncontacted tribes in the world. There are around 25 uncontacted indigenous groups in Peru.

=== Indigenous population by department ===
Rank	Department	Percent in 1940	Percent in 2025	Population in 2025
1	Puno	92.35%	94.17%	1,101,808
2	Apurímac	70.02%	87.70%	390,645
3	Ayacucho	75.94%	86.24%	583,849
4	Huancavelica	78.68%	81.62%	296,083
5	Cusco	71.73%	71.45%	925,478
6	Huanuco	63.46%	39.00%	300,881
7	Tacna	52.17%	38.68%	140,551
8	Ancash	55.83%	33.40%	389,033
9	Moquegua	46.16%	32.19%	57,685
10	Pasco	included in Junin	32.18%	75,797
11	Junin	60.85%	30.34%	413,340
12	Madre de Dios	25.88%	27.64%	51,186
13	Amazonas	20.37%	25.99%	117,764
14	Arequipa	26.44%	24.62%	427,525
15	Loreto	38.16%	17.54%	177,378
16	Ucayali	included in Loreto	16.68%	97,780
17	Ica	29.19%	9.87%	100,373
18	Lima	15.30%	N/A	N/A
18	Lima region	included in Lima	10.77%	104,168
18	Lima province	included in Lima	8.62%	828,349
19	Callao	2.87%	7.36%	76,779
20	San Martín	25.02%	4.04%	38,327
21	Lambayeque	30.09%	3.10%	42,164
22	Cajamarca	12.31%	1.70%	24,311
23	La Libertad	12.86%	0.68%	13,601
24	Piura	37.82%	0.38%	7,949
25	Tumbes	1.46%	0.36%	893
	Peru Total	45.86%	20.74%	6,783,697
Source: Peruvian census 1940 and Peruvian census 2025

== After the Spanish conquest ==
After the arrival of Spanish soldiers in Peru, local people began dying in great number from Eurasian infectious diseases that were chronic among the foreigners. These spread by contact across the New World by Indigenous peoples along trading routes, often years ahead of direct contact with the invaders. As the natives had no natural immunity, they suffered high fatalities in epidemics of the new diseases.

== Marriage ==
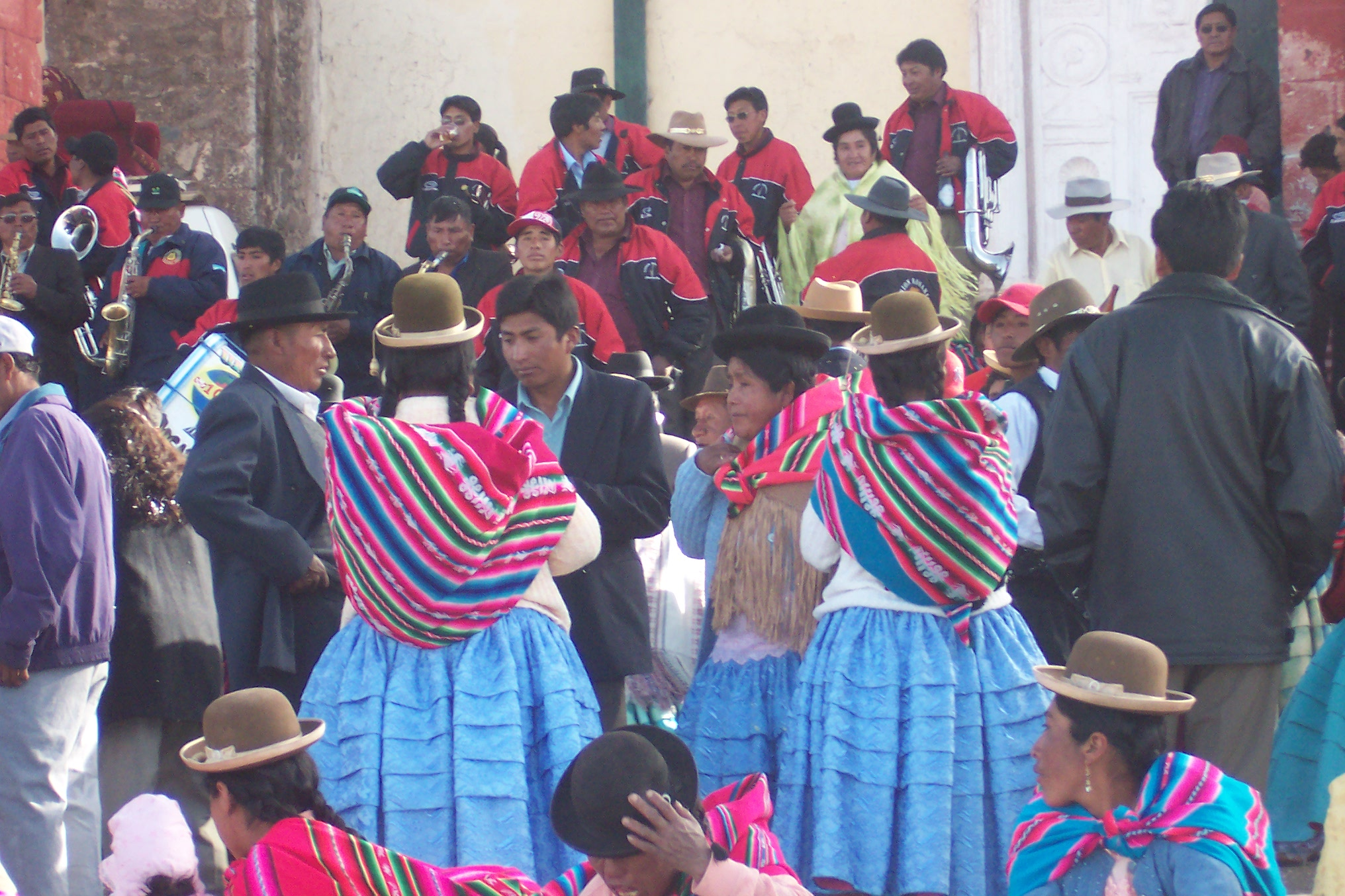
Aymara marriage in Chucuito, Puno.

Women typically got married around 16 years old while men typically married when they were 20 years old. Before the Spanish Inquisition, Incas often engaged in trial marriages. Trial marriages typically lasted a few years and at the end of the trial, both the man and the woman in the relationship could decide to either pursue the relationship or return home. According to Powers, "Andean peoples had clearly understood, long and before the ride of the Inca state, that women’s work and men’s work were complementary and interdependent, that the group’s economic subsistence could not be attained in the absence of one or the other." Once married, women often stayed home to watch over children and livestock, collect food, cook, weave, etc. On the other hand, men often took on more physically taxing responsibilities.

=== Intermarriage ===
From the earliest years, Spanish soldiers and colonists intermarried with the Indigenous women. The Spanish officers and elite married into the Inca elite, and other matches were made among other classes. A sizeable portion of the Peruvian population is mestizo, of Indigenous and European ancestry, speaking Spanish, generally Roman Catholic, and assimilated as the majority culture.

In the late 19th century, major planters in Peru, particularly in the northern plantations, and in Cuba, recruited thousands of mostly male Chinese immigrants as laborers, referred to as "coolies". Because of the demographics, in Peru these men married mostly non-Chinese women, many of them Indigenous Peruvians, during that period of a Chinese migration to Peru. In the late 20th and 21st centuries, many scholars have studied these unions and the cultures their descendants created.

The Chinese also had contact with Peruvian women in cities, where they formed relationships and sired mixed-race children. Typically the Indigenous women had come from Andean and coastal areas to work in the cities. Chinese men favored marriage with them over unions with African Peruvian women. Matchmakers sometimes arranged for mass communal marriages among a group of young Peruvian women and a new group of Chinese coolies. They were paid a deposit to recruit women from the Andean villages for such marriages.

In 1873 The New York Times reported on the Chinese coolies in Peru, describing their indentured labor as akin to slavery. It also reported that Peruvian women sought Chinese men as husbands, considering them to be a "catch" and a "model husband, hard-working, affectionate, faithful and obedient" and "handy to have in the house".

As is typical in times of demographic change, some Peruvians objected to such marriages on racial grounds. When native Peruvian women (cholas et natives, Indias, indígenas) and Chinese men had mixed children, the children were called injerto. As adults, injerto women were preferred by Chinese men as spouses, as they had shared ancestry.

According to Alfredo Sachettí, lower-class Peruvians, including some black and Amerindian women, established sexual unions or marriages with the Chinese men. In Casa Grande highland Amerindian women and Chinese men participated in communal "mass marriages", taking place after a Chinese matchmaker collected groups of highland women and transported them to the marriage site to marry Chinese men.

== Education and language ==
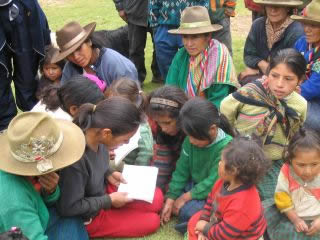
Quechua people in Conchucos District, Ancash.

Significant test score gaps exist between Indigenous students and non-Indigenous students in elementary schools. In addition, Peru has over 60 distinct Amerindian linguistic groups, speaking languages beyond Spanish and the Incan Quechua, not all of which are recognized. Indigenous groups, and therefore language barriers to education, remain a problem primarily in the sierra (Andean highlands) and the selva (Amazon jungle) regions of Peru, less in the cities of the costa (coast). Throughout the second half of the 20th century, steps have been made to target and strengthen Indigenous communities' education, starting with the introduction of bilingual education throughout the country, promoting teaching in both Spanish and Quechua or other Indigenous languages. Quechua was made an official language of Peru in 1975, and while it was later qualified to specific regions of the country and for specific purposes, it is still recognized as equal to Spanish in some regions.

Activists promoting intercultural bilingual education view it as being the solution for a more "equitable, diverse, and respectful society", garnering social economic, political, and cultural rights for Indigenous groups while simultaneously encouraging "Indigenous autonomy and cultural pride". Criticisms of bilingual education have been raised, in some cases most strongly by Quechua-speaking highlanders themselves, strongly opposing intercultural efforts. These Indigenous highlanders view intercultural efforts as an imposition of "disadvantageous educational changes" blocking their economic and social advancement, historically seen as only possible through learning to read and write Spanish. While the legislation has been one of the most forward in Latin America concerning Indigenous education, the implementation of these educational programs has been technically challenging, with teachers agreeing in theory but finding it impossible in practice to bring an intercultural mindset and facilitate bilingualism, particularly with often very limited resources. However, in contrast, studies by Nancy Hornberger and others have shown that the use of children's native language in schools did allow for far greater "oral and written pupil participation - in absolute, linguistic, and sociolinguistic terms".

With a lack of political will and economic force to push a nationally unified bilingual education program, many disconnected efforts have been put forth. The National Division of Intercultural Bilingual Education (DINEBI) was started, among other efforts, and worked to further incorporate bilingual and intercultural education. The Program for the Training of Native Bilingual Teachers (FORMABIAP) is another example of intercultural education efforts, focusing particularly on the Amazon regions of Peru.

== Territories ==
Indigenous people hold title to substantial portions of Peru, primarily in the form of communal reserves (Spanish: reservas comunales). The largest Indigenous communal reserve in Peru belongs to the Matsés people and is located on the Peruvian border with Brazil on the Javary River.

Communal reserves are conservation areas for flora and fauna, allowing traditional use for the rural populations surrounding the areas. The use and marketing of the natural resources within the communal reserve is conducted by the same rural populations.

Reserve	Date	Area (ha)
Yanesha	28 April 1988	34,744
El Sira	22 June 2001	616,413
Amarakaeri	9 May 2002	402,335
Asháninka	14 January 2003	184,468
Machiguenga	14 January 2003	218,905
Purús	20 November 2004	202,033
Tuntanain	10 August 2007	94,967
Chayu Nain	9 December 2009	23,597

== Laws and institutions ==
In 1994, Peru signed and ratified the current international law concerning Indigenous people, the Indigenous and Tribal Peoples Convention, 1989. The convention rules the following: governments are responsible for ensuring that Indigenous peoples possess equal rights and opportunities under national law, for upholding the integrity of cultural and social identity under these rights, and for working toward elimination of existing socio-economic gaps between Indigenous peoples and the rest of the respective national community. To ensure these aims, the convention additionally mandates that governments are to consult communities through their representative institutions regarding any legislature that openly affects their communities, provide modes through which Indigenous peoples can participate in policy decision-making to the same extent as other divisions of the national community, and allocate support, resources, and any other necessary means to these communities for the complete development of their own institutions. The extent to which Peru upholds this legislation is debated, especially in regards to use of Indigenous territories for capital gain. Additionally, implementation of legislature has been protracted, with Indigenous peoples only gaining the legal right to consultation as late as 2011.

== Political organizations ==
Among the more informal organizations in Indigenous communities is the tradition of Rondas Campesinas. Under General Juan Velasco Alvarado’s dictatorial military regime, lasting from 1968 to 1975, the government took on a pro-Andean and pro-Indigenous, nationalist-oriented agenda. This regime broke up Peru's traditional Hacienda system and installed a system of land management based largely around state-run farm cooperatives; however, due to weak state presence beyond coastal regions, the Indigenous peasantry organized local civil defense patrols known as Rondas Campesinas to guard against land invasions. Although their relationship to the government was traditionally ambiguous, they gained more official authority from the government when they rose as an opposing force to the Shining Path guerrilla movement. Rondas Campesinas still function as a form of political organization among communities northern Peru, however their role has largely decreased, as has their legal formality.

The late 2010s have seen a push for autonomous regional governments for Indigenous communities. The Autonomous Territorial Government of the Wampis Nation (GTANW) of the Peruvian Amazon was the first to be established. Other communities followed, including the Kandozi, Shawi, and Shapra peoples, and additional communities are expressing interest in pursuing autonomous governments. The primary function of these governments is to both protect autonomous territories from resource extraction by foreign entities as well as enhance dialogue between the Peruvian state and Indigenous communities through fortified institutions. The Autonomous Territorial Government of the Wampis Nation, established officially in November 2015, has since started operating an autonomous radio broadcaster to service the communities of the Santiago River basin, where the new government is also taking on issues of illegal mining in the area.

Beyond organizations based in regional autonomy, other notable organizations exist for the purpose of establishing Indigenous representation of interests in Peruvian politics. This includes organizations such AIDESEP, the Asociacion Inter-etnica para el Desarollo de la Selva Peruana (Interethnic Association for the Development of the Peruvian Jungle), which defends the collective rights of Indigenous peoples in the Peruvian Amazon. AIDESEP represents 64 Indigenous groups in total. Also based out of the Amazon River Basin is the organization MATSES (Movement in the Amazon for Tribal Subsistence and Economic Sustainability). Unlike the coalition-style organization of AIDESEP, MATSES is a nonprofit organization run specifically by members of the Matsés community; the central aim of this organization is to build the proper institutions to preserve both Matsés culture and lands without influence from external sources of funding or leadership.

== Ethnic groups ==
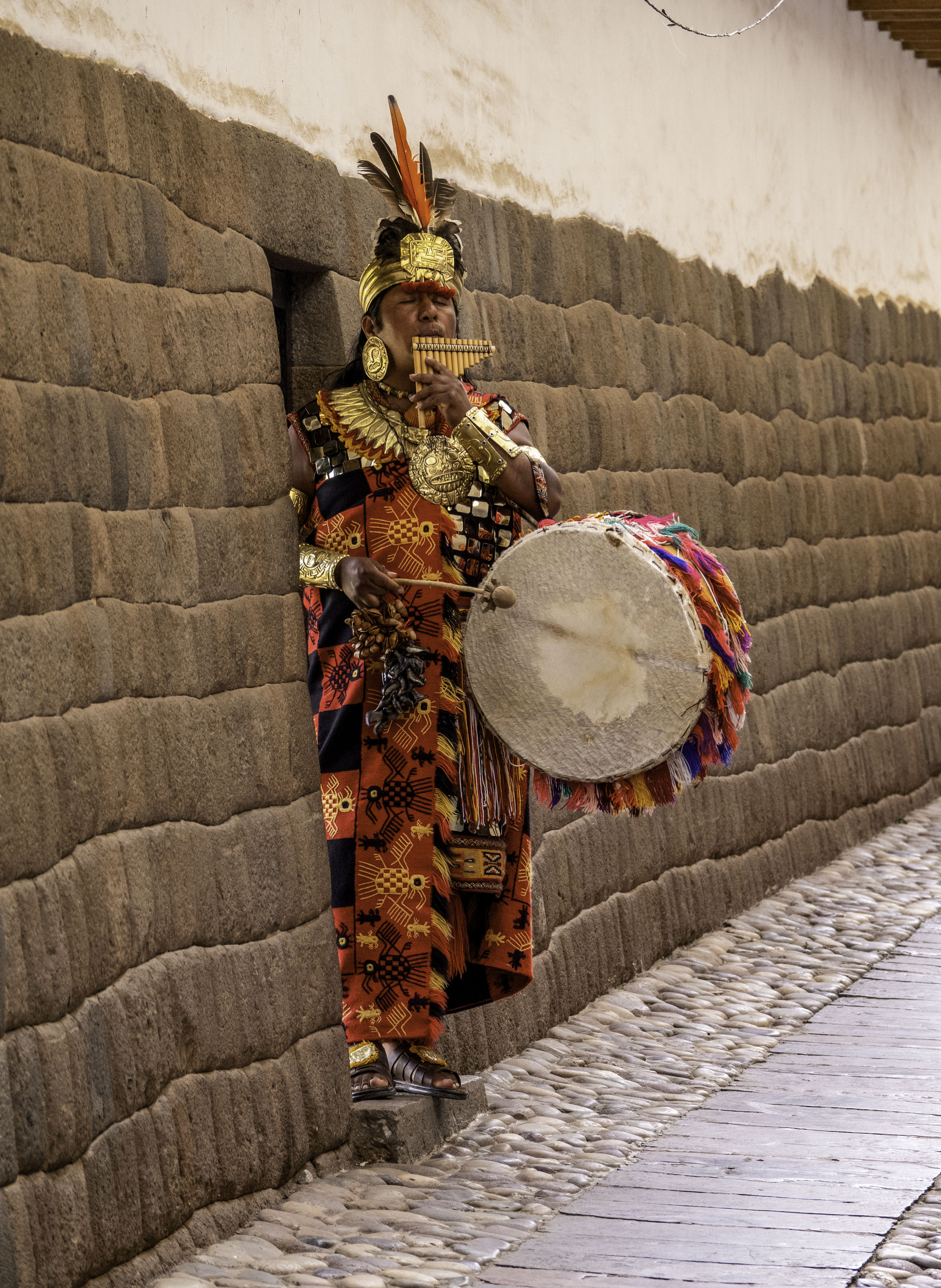
Native American in Cusco - Peru

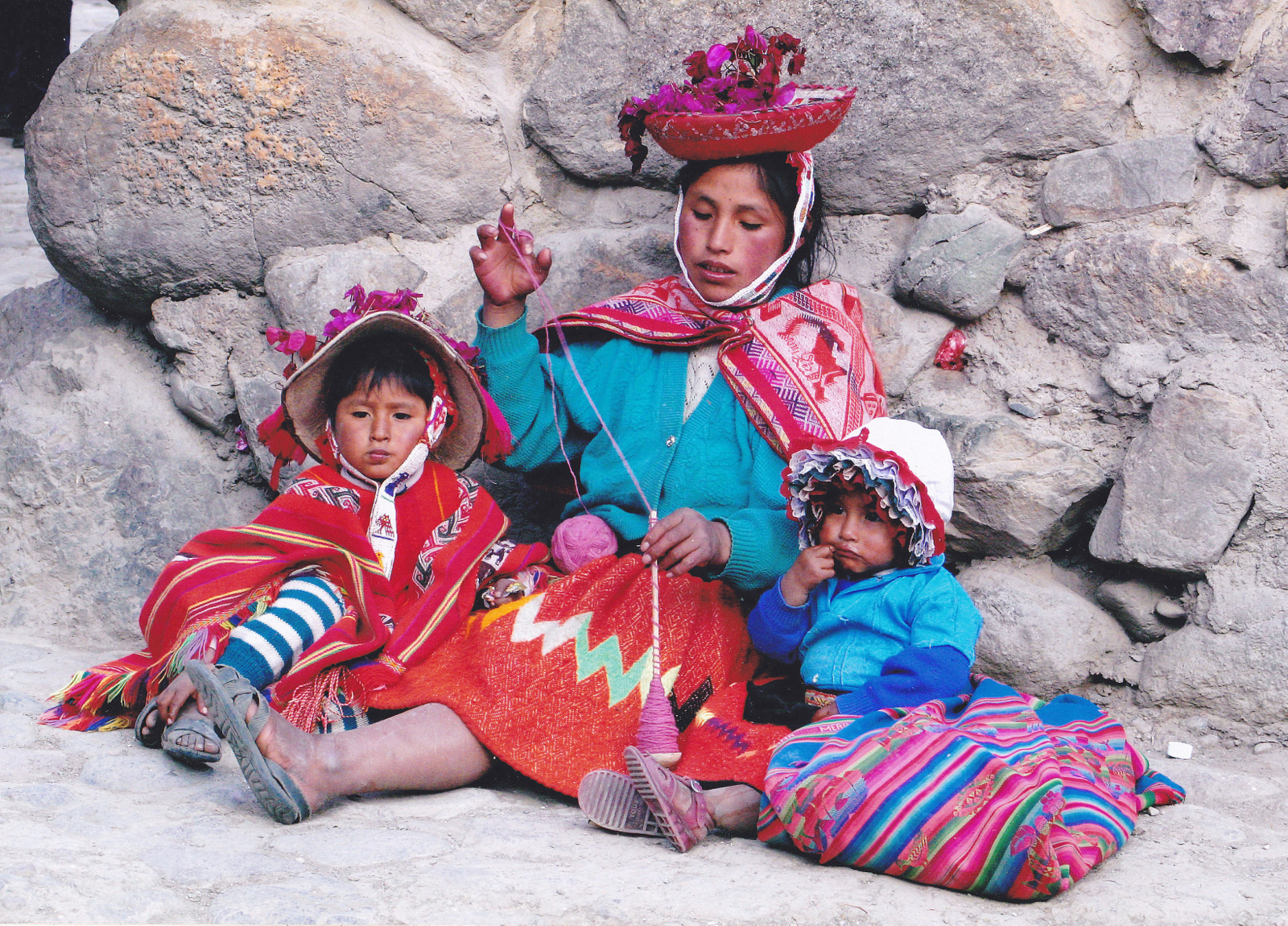
Quechua woman with children in Peru

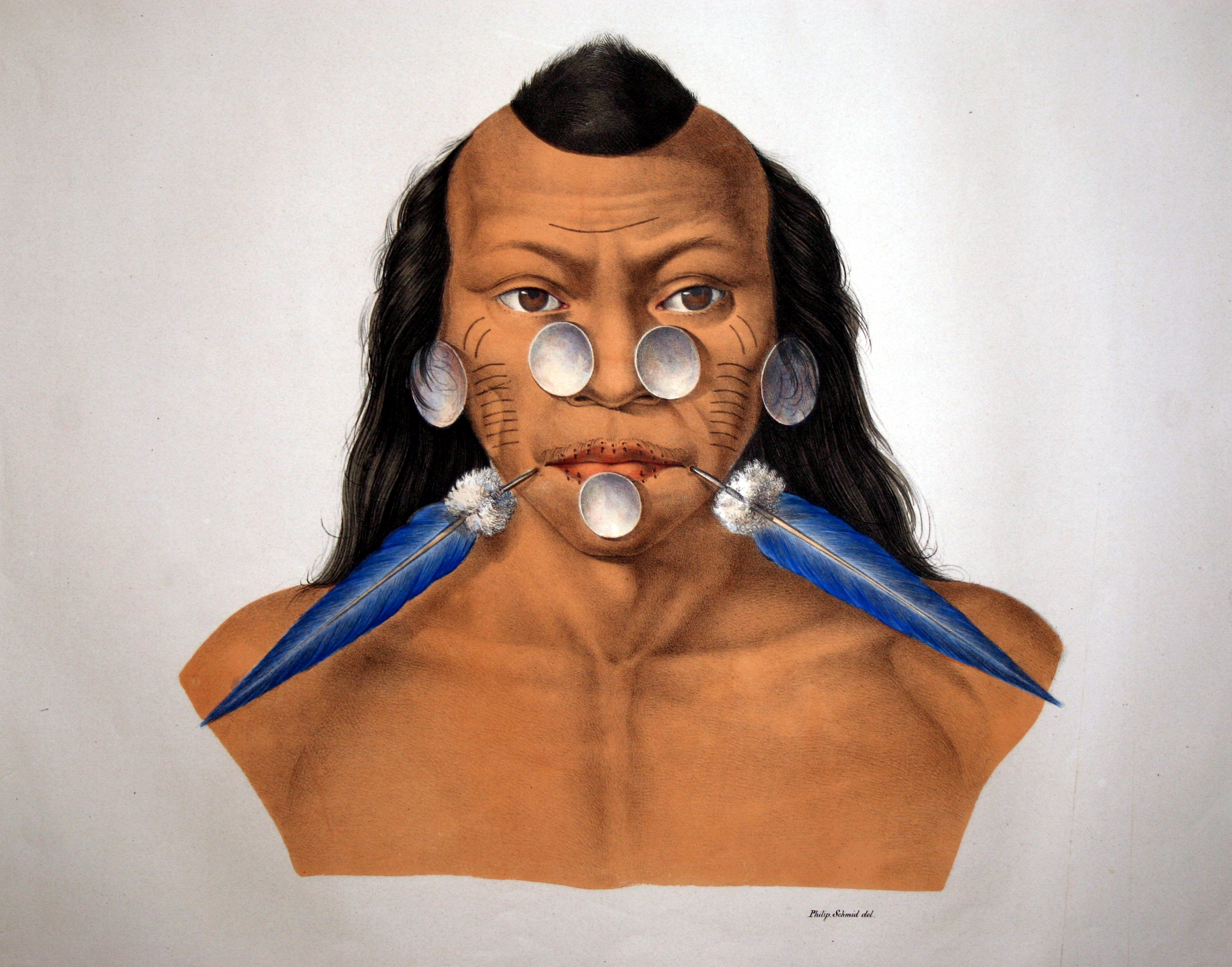
The Matsés living in the Amazon rainforest made their first permanent contact with the outside world in 1969

- Achuar, Amazon
- Aguano, Amazon
- Aguaruna, Amazon, northern Peru
- Amahuaca, Amazon, eastern Peru
- Asháninka, Amazon: Junín, Pasco, Huánuco, and Ucayali Regions
- Aymara, who live primarily in the south.
- Bora, Amazon, north and eastern Peru
- Candoshi, Amazon: Loreto Region
- Cashibo, Amazon
- Chanka, whose direct descendants live primarily in Apurímac, Ayacucho and Lamas.
- Chincha, formerly the Pacific Coast
- Cholones, Amazon
- Cocama
- Cocamilla
- Ese Ejja, Amazon: Madre de Dios Region
- Harakmbut, Amazon: Madre de Dios Region
- Huambisa, Amazon
- Jibito, Amazon
- Jivaro, Amazon, northern Peru

- Shuar, Amazon

- Kaxinawá, Amazon
- Kulina, Amazon
- Korubo
- Machiguenga, Amazon, southeastern Peru
- Machinere, Amazon
- Maina, Amazon
- Mashco-Piro, Amazon: Madre de Dios Region
- Matsés (Mayoruna), Amazon
- Muinane
- Norte Chico civilization (9210–1800 BCE), Pacific coast
- Pocra culture (500–1000 CE), Pacific coast
- Ocaína
- Q'ero, Andes: Cusco Region
- Quechua, direct descendants of the common people from the Inca Empire, who are the majority in the coastal and Andean regions.

- Quijos-Quichua, lowland Quechua of the Napo river. Amazon: Loreto Region
- Canelos-Quichua, lowland Quechua of the Tigre and Corrientes rivers. Amazon: Loreto Region
- Southern Pastaza Quechua, lowland Quechua primarily living south of Andoas in the Pastaza River basin. Amazon: Loreto Region
- Kichwa-Lamista, lowland Quechua living along the Huallaga and Mayo rivers. Amazon: San Martín Region

- Secoya, Amazon, northern Peru
- Shapra, Amazon: Loreto Region
- Shipibo-Conibo, Amazon: eastern Peru
- Ticuna, Amazon
- Tukano
- Urarina, Amazon: Loreto Region
- Uru, Andes: Lake Titicaca
- Huanca, Andes: Junín Region
- Witoto (Huitoto), Amazon, northern Peru
- Yagua, Amazon: northeastern Peru
- Yaminawá, Amazon: Madre de Dios Region
- Yanesha', Amazon: Huánuco, Junín, and Pasco Regions
- Yine, Amazon: Cusco, Loreto, and Ucayali Regions
- Yukunas
- Zaparo, Amazon, northern Peru

== See also ==
- Cerro de la Sal (Salt Mountain)
- Interethnic Association for the Development of the Peruvian Rainforest
- Indigenous peoples in South America
- Indigenous peoples and the War of the Pacific
