= Conservative left =

The conservative left may refer to:

- Advocates of left-wing politics and social conservatism.
  - Left-conservatism
    - Conservative left in Peru
  - List of economic left and socially conservative political parties
  - Left-wing nationalism § Ideology
  - Old Left § Social policy
- Centre-right or right-wing conservatism that is considered the left of the conservative movement
  - Liberal conservatism
  - Moderate conservatism
  - Progressive conservatism
  - Right-wing socialism
