= National Alliance of Workers, Farmers, University Students, and Reservists =

Peruvian political party

National Alliance of Workers, Farmers, University Students and Reservists Alianza Nacional de Trabajadores, Agricultores, Universitarios, Reservistas y Obreros
- Abbreviation: ANTAURO; National Alliance
- Leader: Antauro Humala
- President: Marco Antonio Vizcarra
- Founded: 11 January 2023
- Registered: 12 December 2023
- Banned: 31 October 2024
- Split from: Union for Peru
- Headquarters: San Miguel, Lima
- Ideology: Ethnocacerism; Third Position
- National affiliation: Patriotic Front

Wiphala

Website
- alianzanacional.pe

The National Alliance of Workers, Farmers, University Students and Reservists (Spanish: Alianza Nacional de Trabajadores, Agricultores, Universitarios, Reservistas y Obreros, ANTAURO), or just the National Alliance (Spanish: Alianza Nacional) was a Peruvian political party. Founded in 2023, it is led by Antauro Humala, leader of the Ethnocacerist movement.

== History ==
Following the 2021 general election, Union for Peru (UPP) lost its political registration, leaving the Ethnocacerism without a political vehicle. On 20 August 2022, the leader of the movement, Antauro Humala, was released from prison after 15 years imprisoned due to the Andahuaylazo. He recognized his plans to register two parties in order to compete in the upcoming presidential election: the United Revolutionary Ethnocacerist Party (PERU) and the ANTAURO itself. On 11 January 2023 he submitted the required signatures to register the party.

In September 2023, a private citizen filed a challenge against the imminent registration of the ANTAURO, contending that its leader, Humala, praises the Revolutionary Junta of Juan Velasco Alvarado and supports terrorism, thereby posing a threat to Peruvian democracy. However, on 7 December 2023, the National Jury of Elections (JNE) dismissed the complaint, asserting that Humala did not officially hold any leadership position within the party. Ultimately, the ANTAURO was registered on 12 December 2023 with Marco Antonio Vizcarra, another participant in the Andahuaylazo, as the president and former UPP congressman Rubén Ramos Zapata as the legal official.

Amid widespread concern regarding the party's registration, Prime Minister Alberto Otárola declared his intention to request authorities to investigate the party's ideology, aiming to determine its commitment to democratic principles. Additionally, Congressman Carlos Anderson proposed legislation to prohibit individuals convicted of homicide from assuming the presidency in Peru, a measure designed to preempt any potential presidential candidacy by Humala in the forthcoming 2026 Presidential election.

== Ideology ==
The party's acronym is named after its leader, which has led to the party be deemed as a surrogate, which has been rejected by Humala. The party's main ideology is ethnocacerism, which mixes racial superiority of the 'copper skinned' with anti-Chilean rhetoric and has been described as a form of Andean fascism. Nevertheless, in January 2023, Antauro Humala was denounced for praising the Peruvian communist guerrilla group Shining Path.

The ANTAURO has strongly criticized the release of former President Alberto Fujimori, adopting an overtly Anti-Fujimorist rhetoric in its campaign. According to political analysts, Humala has recently sought to cast himself as the 'Peruvian Bukele', seemingly attempting to position himself as an authoritative leader. In its statute, the ANTAURO advocates for the restoration of the mandatory military service.
