= Ethnocacerism =

Political movement in Peru

The ethnocacerist movement (Spanish: Movimiento etnocacerista, also sometimes referred to as the Movimiento Nacionalista Peruano or "Peruvian Nationalist Movement") is a Peruvian ethnic nationalist movement based on Indigenous communities that espouses an ideology called ethnocacerism (Spanish: etnocacerismo). It draws on the ideas and history of several Indigenous and anti-colonial movements, including those of Juan Velasco Alvarado, Evo Morales, Gamal Abdel Nasser, Muammar Gaddafi, and Che Guevara. Ethnocacerism is considered an Indigenist ideology and is currently represented in electoral politics by the Union for Peru party and other smaller parties. The ideology is also followed by Peruvian militant groups such as the Plurinational Association of Tawantinsuyo Reservists and Ejército de Reservistas Andino Amazónico – T.

Many members of the movement are armed forces veterans of the internal conflict in Peru or the border disputes with Ecuador in the 1980s and 1990s.

== History ==
=== Origins ===
The ideas of ethnocacerism originated from lawyer Isaac Humala, and its practice as a doctrine was begun by his sons Ollanta Humala and Antauro Humala in 1987 during the war against the Shining Path. The origin of the word refers to Andrés Avelino Cáceres, a Peruvian national hero who led the resistance against Chile during the War of the Pacific (1879-1883).

Isaac Humala founded the Instituto de Estudios Etnogeopolíticos (IEE) in 1989 to serve as an ethnocacerist think tank.

=== Locumba Uprising ===
Ethnocacerism became a popular political doctrine following an uprising in Locumba, Tacna, on 29 October 2000, led by the Humala brothers. Their goal was the overthrow of President Alberto Fujimori over the "Vladi-video" scandal. The brothers surrendered on 16 December and were pardoned by Congress six days later. Anti-Fujimori Peruvian media praised the uprising, although the brothers' political views were largely overlooked.

=== Andahuaylazo ===
Antauro gained international prominence on 1 January 2005 by occupying a rural police station in Andahuaylas, Apurimac, an action dubbed "El Andahuaylazo". Four police officers and one gunman died on the first day of the siege. The following day Humala agreed to surrender, though had still failed to do so by the third day, claiming that the government had reneged on its promise to guarantee a "surrender with honour". Eventually he surrendered and was taken to Lima under arrest on 4 January 2005 and was sentenced to 19 years in prison. He was released in early August of 2022.

=== Contemporary history ===
While not affiliated with Antuaro Humala, the Plurinational Association of Tawantinsuyo Reservists (ASPRET) was formed as an ethnocacerist militia in 2011

The main current political party espousing ethnocacerism is Union for Peru. Union for Peru was the main party that spearheaded the impeachment movement that resulted in the removal of Martín Vizcarra from Peru's presidency, with Antauro organizing his followers in Congress through phone calls and prison visits. Antauro was banned from contacting others from prison following this incident.

In 2018, members of ASPRET formed an alliance with the Militarized Communist Party of Peru, called the United Democratic Andean Revolutionary Front of Peru (Spanish: Frente Unido Democrático Andino Revolucionario del Perú). The alliance was dissolved in 2022, following allegations that the MCPC had supported Pedro Castillo during the 2021 election.

ANTAURO, or National Alliance, another party founded by Antauro Humala, was formed in 2023. The party was later banned in 2024.

== Ideology ==
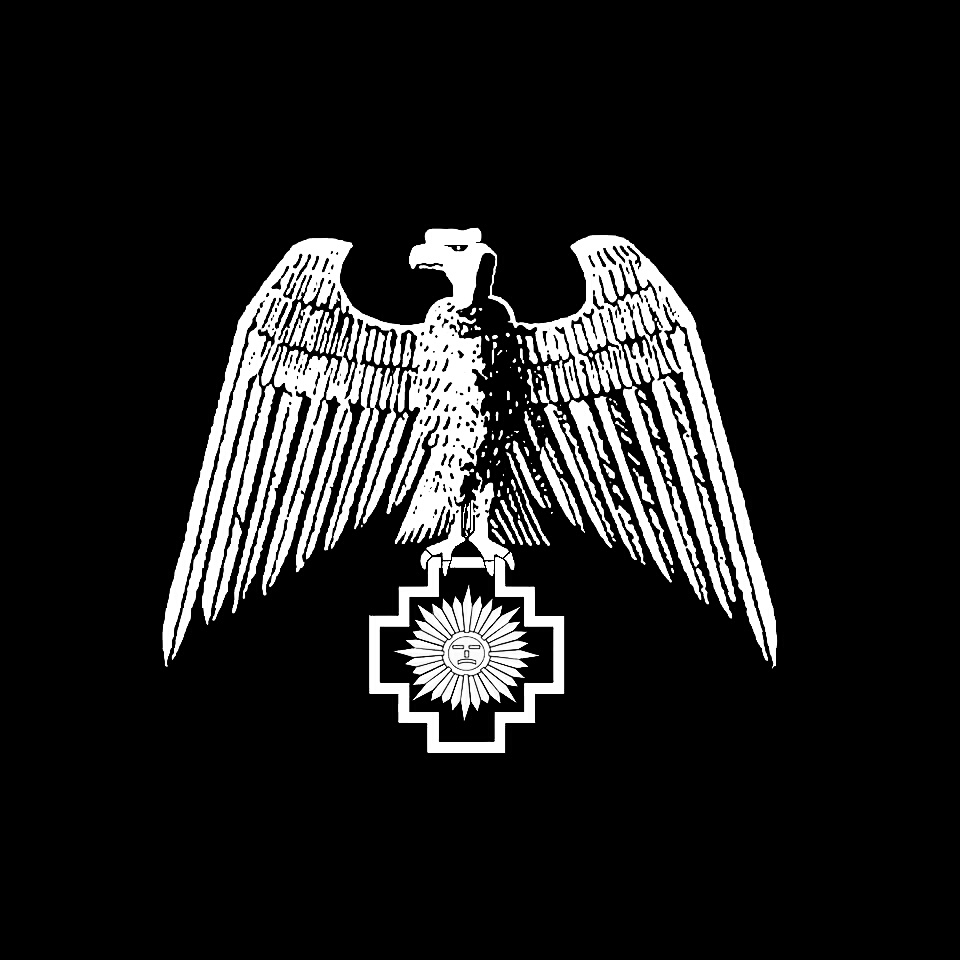
Imperial standard of the Movement.

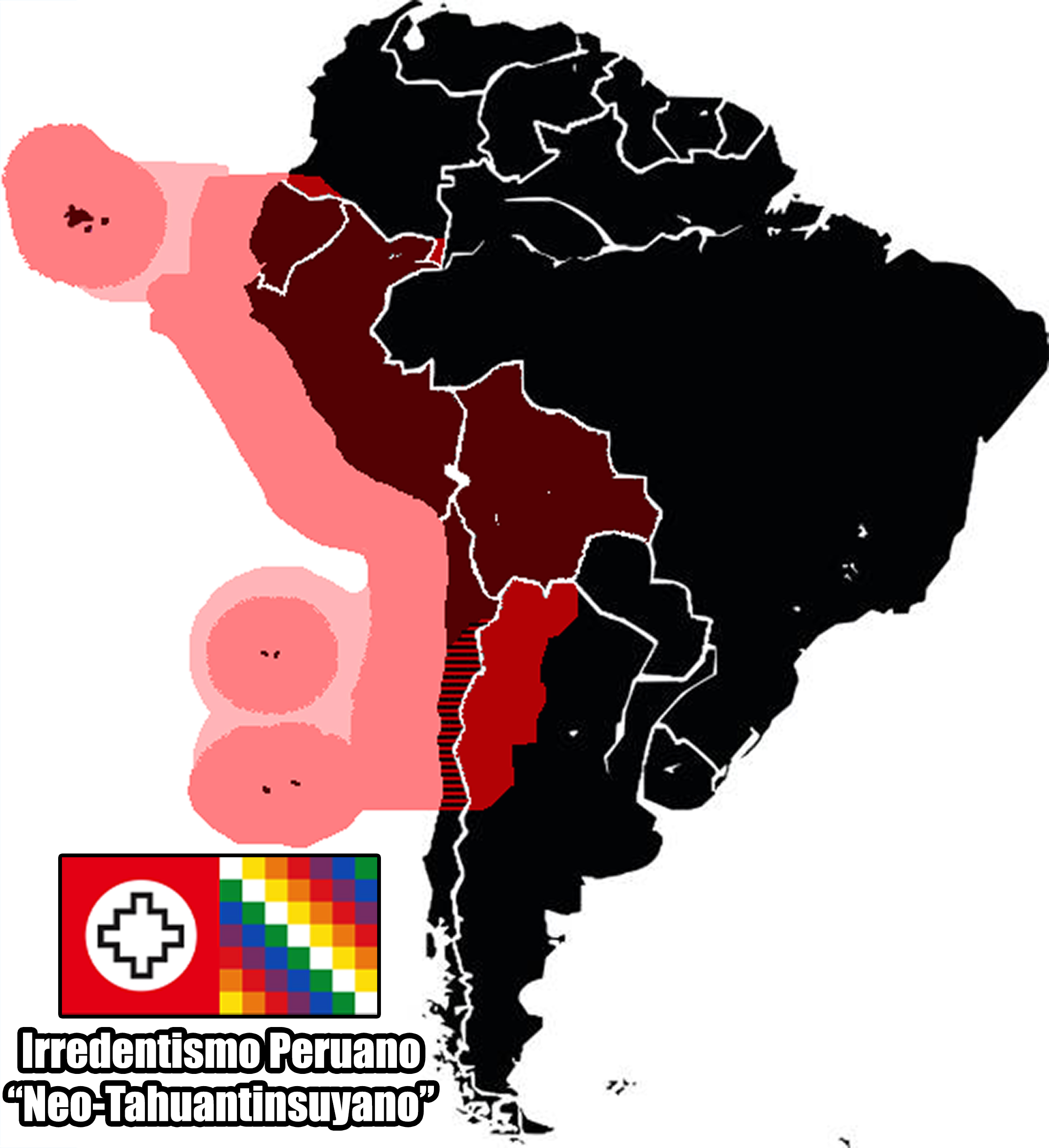
Peruvian indigenist irredentism map based on the "neo-Inca" geopolitical ethnocacerist vision, according to the book Ethnonationalism, Left and Globality by Antauro Humala.

The ethnocacerist movement has been described as having fascist traits, with Vice calling it "an idiosyncratic mix of economic populism, xenophobia — especially towards Peru's southern neighbor Chile — and the mythologizing of the supposed racial superiority of 'copper skinned' Andeans. It also takes an old school machista view of women’s rights while Isaac Humala ... called for the summary shooting of homosexuals and corrupt officials". According to Harper's Magazine, "Anti-Semitic, anti-Chilean 'news' ran alongside xenophobic editorials" in the movement's newspaper, Ollanta (later named Antauro), and ethnocacerists have called for 25% of children to be taken by the state and conscripted. Anthropologist Norma Correa of the Pontifical Catholic University of Peru has stated: "Supposedly, ethnocacerism is about inclusion, but really it excludes so many citizens in a society as diverse as [Peru's], ... It’s not just whites. Ethnocacerism has no place for Afro-Peruvians, Amazonian natives or even mestizos".

Ethnocacerists distinguish themselves from both right-wing and "Eurocentric" left-wing politics in Peru, saying they oppose capitalism, fascism, and Marxism, and instead intend to create an organic Indigenous ideology based on Peru's historical civilizations. Their use of the slogan "ni derecha ni izquierda" traces itself to Juan Velasco Alvarado's military government which was unaligned to either the United States (First World) or Soviet Union (Second World). This position of non-alignment and third-worldism meant looking for solutions in Peruvian and Latin American history, such as the rebel hero Tupac Amaru and writer José Carlos Mariátegui.

=== Territorial views ===
Following from his rejection of Peruvian nationalism, Antauro Humala has condemned Peru's present borders as colonial impositions. A common slogan of his ethnic nationalism is that Peruvian nationalism wants to “reclaim the word ‘Peru’” while his ethnic nationalism wants to reclaim “the concept of tawantinsuyo” (the Quechua name for the Inca Empire), because “as an ethnic nationalist, I cannot respect criollo borders...my ancestral homeland encompasses Tucumán all the way to Pasto. We are a single people disseminated amongst various criollo states”.

Antauro calls the Andean countries and regions “the Inkan International” ("La Internacional Inkaica"). The territorial views of ethnocacerists would expand Peru's population from around 30 million to over 100 million people.

Ethnocacerists supported Evo Morales's 2019 re-election and condemned his subsequent resignation and replacement as "fascist" and "neocolonialist".

== See also ==
- Chauvinism
- Conservative left in Peru
- Ethnocentrism
- Ethnofuturism
- Fascism in Peru
- Indigenism
- Indigenous peoples and the War of the Pacific
- National Bolshevism
- National Synarchist Union
- Nicolás Palacios
- Peru Wins
- Populism in Latin America
- Racial nationalism
- Strasserism
