= Cocamilla =

Indigenous people of Peru and Colombia

Cocamilla (Kokamilla) are an indigenous people of Peru and Colombia. In the seventeenth century disease and conflict with the Spanish caused their population to dwindle from 1,600 to fewer than a hundred. In the nineteenth century their population rebounded and by the late 1980s reached nearly 7,000. They have partly assimilated and are said to have an identity that is "neither Indian nor white mestizo." They speak a dialect of the Cocama language and also Spanish.
