= Chayu Nain Communal Reserve =

Protected area in Amazonas, Peru

- Reserva Comunal Chayu Nain
- IUCN category VI (protected area with sustainable use of natural resources)
- Location within Peru
- Location: Bagua Province and Utcubamba Province, Amazonas Region, Peru
- Coordinates: 5°26′26″S 78°15′26″W
- Area: 23,597.76 ha (58,311.3 acres)
- Established: December 9, 2009
- Governing body: SERNANP
- Website: www.sernanp.gob.pe

The Chayu Nain Communal Reserve (Spanish: Reserva Comunal Chayu Nain) is a protected area in the Amazonas Region of northern Peru, located in the districts of Aramango, Imaza, and Cajaruro, spanning the provinces of Bagua and Utcubamba.

The reserve was officially created on December 9, 2009, through Supreme Decree No. 021-2009-MINAM. It covers an area of 23,597.76 hectares (58,311.3 acres) and is part of Peru's National System of Natural Protected Areas.

The reserve is home to key species such as the yellow-tailed woolly monkey (Oreonax flavicauda), spectacled bear (Tremarctos ornatus), and South American tapir (Tapirus terrestris). Unique birdlife and a recently described endemic marsupial, Caenolestes condorensis, have also been recorded. Vegetation includes high-altitude shrublands and grasslands on sandstone formations of the Cordillera del Cóndor.

== See also ==
- Cordillera de Colán National Sanctuary
