= Candoshi people =

Indigenous group in Peru

The Candoshi people are an indigenous group of the Peruvian Amazon, primarily living in the province of Datem del Marañón, Loreto Region, along the Huitoyacu, Rimachi, Pastaza, Nucuray, and Manchari Rivers. Their population is estimated to be 3,000 people.
