= House of Sarratea =

House in Breña, Lima

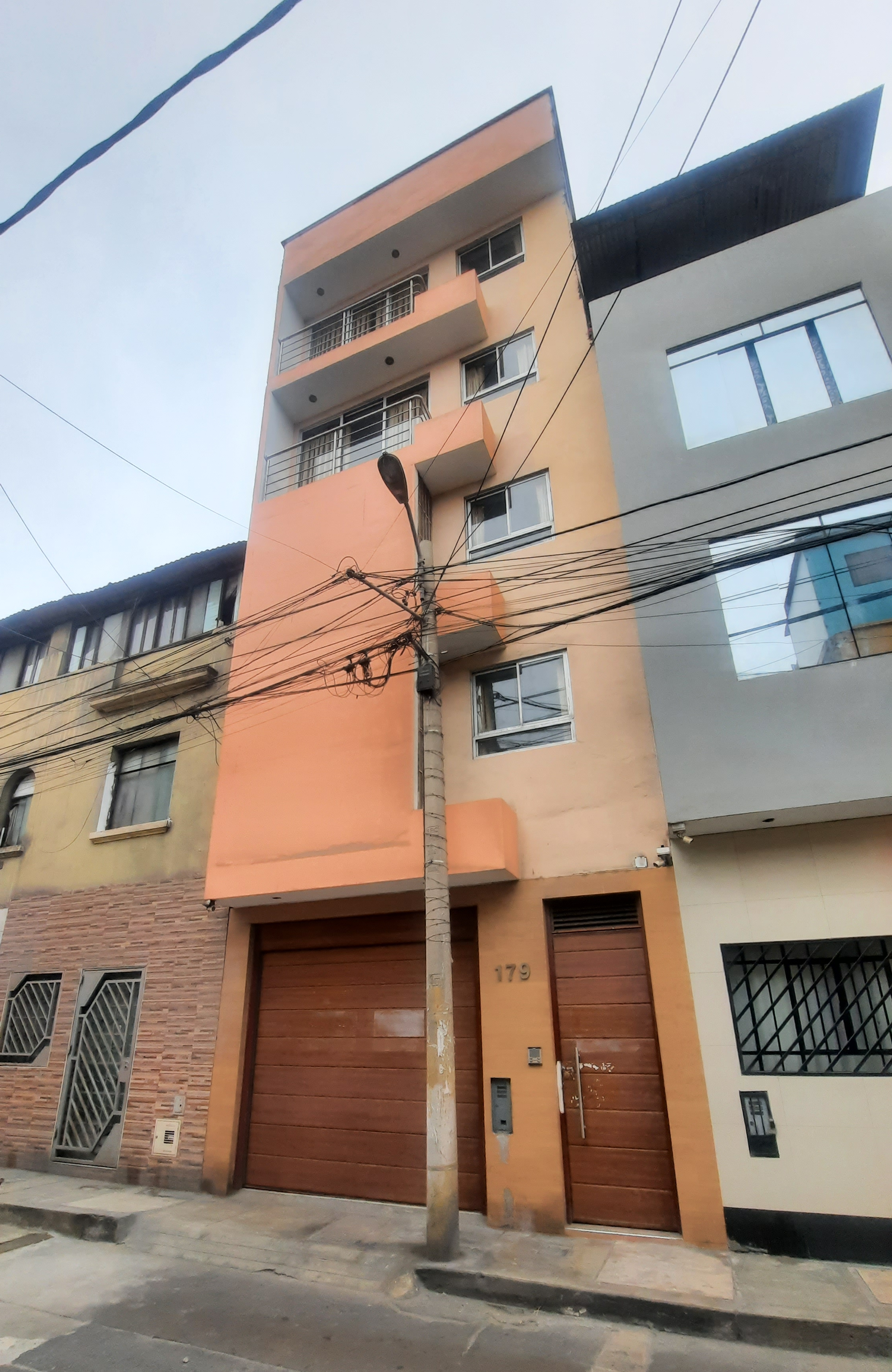
House of Sarratea

The House of Sarratea is a property located in the Breña district of Lima. The house was owned by businessman Alejandro Sánchez Sánchez and used by Pedro Castillo for various meetings, some of them related to corruption cases. After being seized, it was converted into a police facility.

== History ==
The building takes its name from its location at 179 Sarratea Passage in the district of Breña, which was named in memory of Juan José de Sarratea, an Argentine businessman who was involved in Peru's independence process. The five-story building was owned by businessman Alejandro Sánchez Sánchez, who was a friend of Pedro Castillo. It was first used by Castillo during the 2017 teachers' strike. Then, during the 2021 general elections, the house was used as the campaign headquarters for the Free Peru party, with Castillo holding meetings with various figures there. After winning the election and assuming the office of president of the Republic, Castillo secretly used the house to hold late-night meetings with government officials, lobbyists, businessmen, and others without keeping an official record. Castillo was photographed wearing a sports cap instead of the hat he wore in public. Because of this, the house was considered a parallel “Presidential Office,” and the prosecutor's office considered the property a “center of operations” for acts of corruption.

In January 2023, the property was raided by the Special Team of Prosecutors against Corruption in Power (EFICCOP) together with police officers from the High Complexity Division (DIVIAC) and seized. During the process, documentation related to the cases investigated by the prosecutor's office was confiscated. It subsequently became the property of the National Program for Seized Assets (PRONABI). In 2024, it was reported that the house had been converted into an intelligence and security operations center for the Peruvian National Police (PNP).
