= Indigenous peoples and the War of the Pacific =

The Indigenous peoples in the countries involved in the War of the Pacific (1879–1884), Bolivia, Chile and Peru were variously impacted by direct warfare, mobilisation and taxation during the war. At the start of the war three quarters of the population of Peru lived in the Andean highlands where Indigenous peoples were in majority. Many infantry units mobilized by Bolivia and Peru consisted primarily of Indigenous conscripts.

Indigenous peoples were frequently used to portray the enemy in alterity discourses that continued after the war. Chilean officers routinely referred to Peruvians and Bolivians with terms that stressed Indigenous heritage such as cholo and indio. Some Chilean narratives portrayed the war as a "civilizing crusade" against a backward Ancien régime that fought with armies of Indigenous barbarians. On their part, some Bolivian and Peruvian discourses identified Chileans with the warrior-like Mapuche (Araucanians) and descendants of Spanish "scum" (escoria) different to the Spanish that settled in their countries. A few Mapuches actually fought in the Chileans ranks, for example Juan Bravo who excelled as naval sniper.

Despite racial discourses and racism, the war itself was never seen as a racial one by its participants.

At the start of the war, Mapuche factions hostile to Chile noticed the shrinking of Chilean garrisons in the Chile-Mapuche frontier as the country sent troops northwards to fight Peru and Bolivia. The apparent weakening of Chilean military presence in Araucanía and the many abuses caused the Mapuches to start planning rebellion.

== 1881–1884 ==
After the occupation of Lima, Chile diverted part of its war efforts to crush Mapuche resistance in the south. Concurrently with these victories, Chilean newspapers published extremely patriotic, chauvinist, and expansionistic material. An extreme example of such journalism is Revista del Sur, which stated that firearms obtained in Peru, while useless in the hands of Peruvian "fags" (Spanish: maricas), would be useful by Chileans to "kill indians" (Mapuches). Chilean troops coming from Peru entered Araucanía in early 1881 and then in November 1881 defeated the last major Mapuche uprising.

In Peru, montoneras of Indigenous peasants were crucial in resisting and hindering the Chilean occupation of the central and northern highlands. Andrés Avelino Cáceres knowledge of Quechua would have helped him rally support among Indigenous Peruvians for his resistance movement in the central highlands. According to historian Nelson Manrique anti-Indigenous attitudes developed in the occupation of Araucanía explains the Chilean soldiers many abuses against Indigenous peasants in the Peruvian highlands. Chilean general Estanislao del Canto who fought in Breña campaign in Peru expressed remorse over atrocities against the Mapuche in the occupation of Araucanía such as the arson of rukas and crop fields.

== Post-war discourses ==
After the war, the Indigenous peoples in Peru became scapegoats in the narratives of Peruvian criollo elites, exemplified in the writing of Ricardo Palma:

The principal cause of the great defeat is that the majority of Peru is composed of that wretched and degraded race that we once attempted to dignify and ennoble. The Indian lacks patriotic sense; he is born enemy of the white and of the man of the coast. It makes no difference to him whether he is a Chilean or a Turk. To educate the Indian and to inspire him a feeling for patriotism will not be the task of our institutions, but of the ages.

From the views of Palma, it has been understood some Peruvian elites demanded patriotism from the Indigenous populations but saw them as inferior and did not share a sense of belonging with them.

A view that was relatively unchallenged in Peru until the late 20th century was that Indigenous peoples of the Peruvian highlands had turned collaborationist supporting "general Chile" against "general Pirú". On the contrary it was noted by Nelson Manrique that indigenous resistance in the Andean highlands was key to keep the war effort afloat after the fall of Lima in 1881. Manrique though warns of simplified narratives regarding the role of the Indigenous peoples in the war.

Chile's newly-acquired Aymara population was seen after the war as a "foreign element" contrasting with the also newly-conquered Mapuches who were seen as "primordial" Chileans.
