= Chuschi ballot burning incident =

1980 terrorist attack in Peru

The Chuschi ballot burning incident occurred on the night of 17 May 1980 in the Peruvian district of Chuschi in Ayacucho. It was the first attack perpetrated by the militant Maoist group Shining Path.

In 1980, the Revolutionary Government of the Armed Forces called for elections after 12 years of electoral pause. Shining Path was a terrorist organization that opposed these elections, and opted to start an armed conflict in the form of Guerilla warfare in the northern provinces of the Department of Ayacucho. On 17 May 1980, the eve of the presidential elections, members of Shining Path (group which then lacked notoriety) forced themselves through the door of the offices of the Electoral Registry that was locked with a stick. One of the hooded members came through the door and pointed his revolver at Florencio Conde Núñez, who was the registrar of Chuschi at the time. They told Conde Núñez that they were soldiers from Pampa Cangallo, capital of the district of Morochucos. They stole 24 ballot boxes, seals, a registration notebook, unused ballots, and other electoral materials. After thirty minutes, they told Conde Núñez that he go to the military base the next day.

When the members of Shining Path walked off, a bell was sounded to summon the varayocc (mayors, aldermen, bailiffs) and the entire community. They all gathered and went in search of the ballot boxes. They found a portion of the ballot boxes burnt at a bridge in Quispillaqta. They later found another portion of these burnt ballot boxes in the main plaza of Chuschi. The villagers took into custody an elementary school teacher named Bernardino Azurza Páucar, who was found awake with a kerosene lamp in hand, and a group of Shining Path members who participated in the incident who were hiding out in an abandoned house in Quispillaqta, before bringing them into the custody of the military. New electoral material was moved on a military transport to Chuschi, and the elections were carried out without major incident. This was the first terrorist attack carried out by Shining Path, and therefore did not receive much attention in the Peruvian press; only two of the capital's newspapers, La Prensa and Diario de Marka, covered the story, attributing the attack to a group of exalts.
