= Chuschi =

Town in Cangallo Province, Ayacucho Region, Peru

Coordinates: 13°35′S 74°21′W

Chuschi is a town in the Chuschi District of the Cangallo Province of the Ayacucho Region of Peru. On May 17, 1980, Shining Path guerrillas began their war against the Peruvian state by burning ballot boxes in Chuschi. On March 14, 1991, government forces perpetrated the Chuschi massacre in the town.
