= Locumba uprising =

2000 rebellion in Peru

Locumba uprising Locumbazo
- Part of the Internal conflict in Peru
Date	29 October 2000
Location	Locumba and the Toquepala mine
Result	Uprising failure

Belligerents
Government of Peru	Ethnocacerists

Commanders and leaders
Alberto Fujimori (Peru) Vladimiro Montesinos	Ollanta Humala (surrendered); Antauro Humala (surrendered); Almícar Gomez (surrendered)

Units involved
Peruvian Army	Sixth Armored Division

Strength
500+	51–60

Casualties and losses
none	6th Armored Division surrender

The Locumba uprising, also called Locumbazo, was a military uprising that took place in Locumba, Peru, and the Toquepala mine on Sunday, 29 October 2000.

== Background ==
Encouraged by his wife, Ollanta Humala, a Lt. Col in the Peruvian military, along with 51, 57 or 60 soldiers of the Sixth Armored Division out of the Arica barracks left the barracks under the pretext of a campaign march or patrol in Alto de la Alianza. After his brother, Antauro Humala joined, he revealed his plans to rebel against the government which caused many soldiers to feel tricked or deceived. Carlos Bardales Angulo, the brigadier general who was head of the Sixth Armored Division confronted the soldiers and was taken hostage. Then the group continued to the Toquepala mine and they captured it the following morning. They remained in control of the mine for seven hours until fleeing to the mountains. Ollanta requested food, vehicle fuel and medicine for men and took four workers hostage (a driver, two security personnel and an electrician). During his time in the mine, he called RPP radio where he condemned the election as fraudulent and said:

I will lay down my arms when the chain of command is legitimate and there is a president who has been truly elected by the people to whom I would swear subordination and valor.

— Lt. Col. Ollanta Humala, Either said in a fax to Reuters addressed to Peru, or said in an RPP interview

The group then left and started travelling by bus and truck to a military garrison near Puno, although many had abandoned. By the end of the day on Monday, only seven or eight mutineers remained at large in the mountains. The then president, Alberto Fujimori fled the country three weeks after the uprising and a new transitional government was instituted. The brothers turned themselves in on 10 December, after seeing the country had been normalized. They were tried for insubordination but pardoned along with all who participated in the revolt. The uprising marked the beginning of Ollanta's career which later led to his presidency in 2011.

== Support ==
During the revolt, Humala called on Peruvian "patriots" to join him in the rebellion, and around 300 former soldiers led by his brother Antauro answered his call and were reported to have been in a convoy attempting to join up with Humala. The revolt gained some sympathy from the Peruvian populace with the influential opposition newspaper La República calling him "valiant and decisive, unlike most in Peru". The newspaper also had many letters sent in by readers with accolades to Ollanta and his men.

== Montesinos' escape ==
On the day of the uprising, after hiding for months in the country, Peru's de facto leader, Vladimiro Montesinos left Peru at the Port of Callao on his boat Karisma. While sailing away from Peru, he made four phone calls to Fort Arica, one at 10:52 am and the other three after 2:00 pm. On 19 May 2006, an audio tape leaked on which Montesinos says the uprising was a cover for his escape:

Fue una farsa, fue una operación de engaño y una manipulación. Ollanta Humala Tasso es un falso valor. Ante esto es necesario relatar los hechos acaecidos en Locumba y la relación con mi salida del país en octubre del año 2000.
transl. It was a farce, it was an operation of deceit and manipulation. Ollanta Humala Tasso is a false value/courage. In view of this, it is necessary to relate the events that took place in Locumba and the relationship with my departure from the country in October 2000.

— Full transcription from El Comercio

Later that night at a press conference, Humala accused Montesinos of being in collusion with Alan Garcia's Aprista Party.

Others have also claimed the uprising was a cover for the escape. During a congressional hearing, César Mojovich, a retired PNP commander and former Toquepala commissioner, said that Antauro arrived to Fort Arica in a helicopter two days before the uprising and met with Carlos Bardales Angulo as well as the colonel of the PNP, that same night.

El general Bardales, junto a Ollanta y Antauro Humala se reunieron antes del levantamiento. Bardales nunca fue secuestrado, sino que coordinó antes, durante y después del supuesto levantamiento. El secuestrado fue al alcance de los secuestradores.
transl. General Bardales, together with Ollanta and Antauro Humala met before the uprising. Bardales was never kidnapped, but coordinated before, during and after the alleged uprising. The kidnapped person was within reach of the kidnappers.

— César Mojovich,

Mojovich also said that once Bardales was "released", he met in Moquegua with General Abraham Cano, who was in charge of searching for the insurgents.
