= Isaac Humala =

Peruvian labour lawyer and ethnocacerist

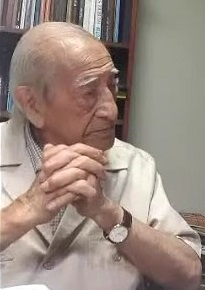
- Humala in January 2023
- Born: Isaac Humala Núñez; 2 July 1931 (age 94); Oyolo, Ayacucho, Peru
- Education: National University of San Marcos
- Occupations: Lawyer, politician
- Political party: Movimiento Etnocacerista
- Other political affiliations: Free Peru (for the 2020 elections); Communist Party of Peru – Red Fatherland; Restructuring Committee of the Peruvian Communist Party; Revolutionary Left Movement; Peruvian Communist Party
- Spouse: Elena Tasso de Humala
- Children: 10, including Antauro, Ollanta, and Ulises

Isaac Humala Núñez (born 1931) is a Peruvian labour lawyer and the ideological leader of the Movimiento Etnocacerista, a group of ethnic nationalists in Peru.

== Personal life ==
Isaac Humala Núñez, descended from Hispanics and Europeans who immigrated to the Andes and speaks Quechua (like almost everyone else in the Andes of Peru), is the father of Ollanta Humala, a former president of Peru. His wife Elena Tasso Heredia is from an old Italian family that established itself in Peru at the end of the 19th century. One of his other sons, Antauro Humala, a former army major, ran a rebellion against the government's policies in the Andean city of Andahuaylas in December 2004, in which a police station was seized and some people were killed. His eldest son, Ulises Humala, also ran for president in 2006, and currently occupies a full-time position as a professor at the National University of Engineering in Peru.

== Beliefs ==
Humala is a self-proclaimed subversive: "a patriot has to be...Christ was and so are we", he declared in an interview. He had previously been an active member of the Communist Party of Peru – Red Fatherland and the Revolutionary Left Movement.

Humala is an ethnic nationalist, advocating for the "copper skinned" Andean peoples of Peru. According to Humala: "the human species had four races, of which one is practically separate, the white one that dominates the world, the yellow has two powers, China and Japan, and the Black, although without the same weight as the others, at least dominates its own continent. On the other hand, the copper race does not govern anywhere."

=== Ethnocacerism ===
In 1989, Humala founded the Instituto de Estudios Etnogeopolíticos (IEE), the think tank of his ethnocacerist ideology. Likewise, he founded the Peruvian Nationalist Movement (MNP) - a political group that assumes the postulates of "ethnocacerism" - according to an agreement taken in Alto de la Alianza, Tacna, on 29 October 2003 (third anniversary of the uprising of his sons against the Fujimori government), setting the primary objective of gaining electoral power but without ruling out the possibility of using the armed means. Its symbol is "El sembrador" by the indigenous painter José Sabogal.

== Political career ==
=== 2006 Peruvian general election ===
Vargas Llosa published an editorial on 15 January 2006, attacking Issac Humala's beliefs. Humala has said that his movement advocates more political sovereignty for Peru's indigenous members as they suffer more than the descendants of Europeans, who he believes hold too much influence in Peru and throughout the Andes.

During the 2006 Peruvian general election, Humala, father of candidates Ollanta and Ulises, said that he would free Shining Path and MRTA leaders Abimael Guzmán and Víctor Polay, since he considers that terrorist movements no longer represent a threat to Peruvian society. This came after a letter was signed by several public figures, including Ulises and fellow candidates Javier Diez Canseco and Alberto Moreno, demanding a fair trial for Polay. Most candidates rushed to condemn Isaac Humala's comments—including both Humala's candidate sons.

=== 2020 Peruvian snap parliamentary elections ===
In November 2019, at the age of 88, he announced his candidacy for the Congress of the Republic for the Free Peru party for the extraordinary elections of 2020. However, a month later his candidacy was excluded from the National Jury of Elections after having omitted information about his personal property on the resume he submitted.

== See also ==
- Pan-Americanism
