= Antauro Humala =

Army major and politician in Peru

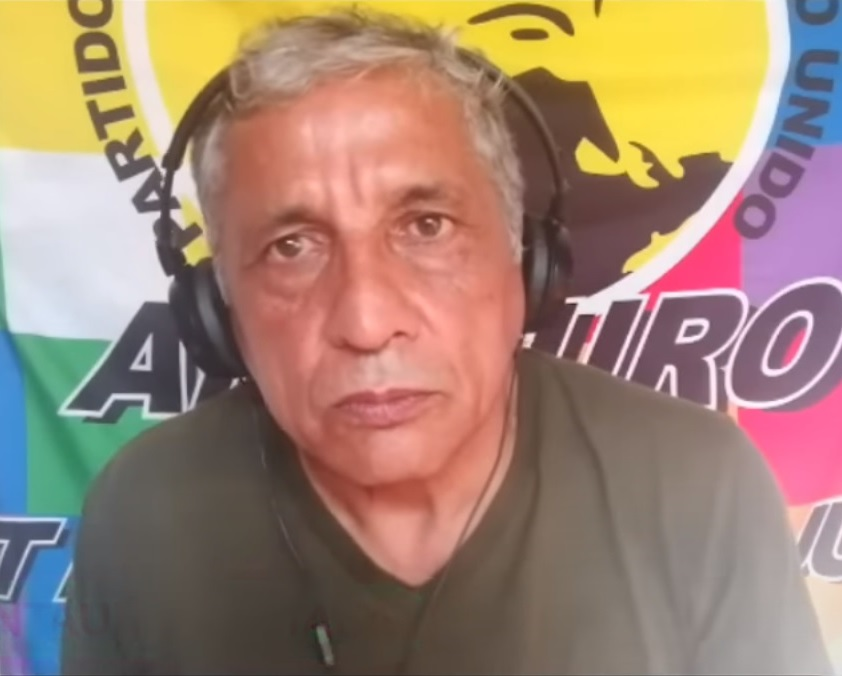
- Humala in 2023

Leader of ANTAURO
- Incumbent
- Assumed office 11 January 2023
- Preceded by: Party established

Personal details
- Born: Antauro Igor Humala Tasso; 29 June 1963 (age 63) Lima, Peru
- Party: ANTAURO (2023-present); Union for Peru (since the late-2010s); Go on Country (prior to the late-2010s)
- Other political affiliations: Movimiento Etnocacerista
- Parent: Isaac Humala (father)
- Relatives: Ollanta Humala (brother)

Military service
- Allegiance: Peru
- Branch/service: Peruvian Army
- Years of service: 1985–2005
- Rank: Major
- Battles/wars: Internal conflict in Peru; Cenepa War; Locumbazo; Andahuaylazo

Antauro Igor Humala Tasso (born 29 June 1963) is a Peruvian ethnocacerist, a former army major, and nationalist leader. He has been the Leader of the political party ANTAURO since its creation in 2023.

== Early life ==
Antauro Igor Humala Tasso was born in Lima, on 29 June 1963. Son of lawyers Isaac Humala and Elena Tasso. He is the brother of former president Ollanta Humala and the leader of the ethnocacerist movement Frente Patriótico Peruano.

He studied at the Franco-Peruvian College of the city of Lima and at the National College of Sciences and Arts of Cuzco. He entered the National Agrarian University La Molina in the career of Agricultural Engineering.

== Military career ==
In 1979, he entered the Military School of Chorrillos. He graduated from the 1985 promotion "Héroes de Concepción". Afterwards, he was head of anti-insurgency patrol during the early Shining Path insurgency. He participated as a captain, taking part in the war operations in 1995 during the Cenepa War. He proved to be a capable soldier, and in 1997 he was promoted to Major of the Peruvian Army.

=== Coup attempts ===
==== Locumba uprising ====
He and his brother Ollanta Humala had previously led 50 followers in the brief Locumba uprising against President Alberto Fujimori during the dying days of his regime in October 2000. After the assault, carried out when the Fujimori regime was in the midst of crisis, the rebel group toured the Peruvian Andes denouncing the illegality of Fujimori and claiming the "dignity" of the Peruvian Armed Forces, according to him and his brother, in the hands of military leaders corrupt.

==== Andahuaylazo ====
He attained international prominence on 1 January 2005 by occupying a rural police station in Andahuaylas, Apurimac. Assisted by a large group of followers (press reports range from 70 to 300 in their estimates), demanded the resignation of President Alejandro Toledo, whom he accused of selling Peru out to foreign (particularly Chilean) investors.

Four police officers and one gunman died on the first day of the rebellion. The following day Humala agreed to surrender, though had still failed to do so by the third day, claiming that the government had reneged on its promise to guarantee a "surrender with honour". Eventually he surrendered and was taken to Lima under arrest on 4 January 2005 and was sentenced to 19 years in prison.

== Political career ==
In May 2001, after the Locumba Uprising, Antauro Humala published his first book Ejercito Peruano: Milenarismo, Nacionalismo y Etnocacerismo in which he lays out Etnocacerismo, primarily its anticolonial military doctrine and critical Indigenist analysis of Peruvian history and society.

Humala was an unsuccessful candidate for Congress in the April 2006 elections running under the Go on Country - Social Integration Party.

In 2011 his brother became president of Peru.

In the last 2020 parliamentary elections, he joined the political party Union for Peru, a party that obtained a total of 13 seats out of 130 nationwide. Later that year, his partisans in Congress were among those who voted for the removal of former President Martín Vizcarra.

In the recent 2021 president election, Humala entered into an alliance with the candidate for Free Peru (Perú Libre), Pedro Castillo. The alliance is conditioned on an early pardon from his prison sentence and his reinstatement into the military, potentially leading the armed forces. In return, he pledged to support Castillo and defend him from a potential military coup led by conservative generals with ties to the far right including former presidential candidate, Rafael López Aliaga.

== Imprisonment ==
In 2006, Antauro Humala published his book Etnonacionalismo: Izquierda y Globalidad (Visión Etnocacerista) in which he laid out the anticolonial and Neo-Incan ideology of his Etnocacerist movement. Topics discussed in the book are the anti-indigenous racism of Peruvian society, Etnocacerism's place compared to former Indigenists such as José Carlos Mariátegui and José María Arguedas, and a plan for a 2nd Inca Empire (Confederation with Bolivia and Ecuador). A second and third editions expanded on the first one and were published on 2007 and 2011, respectively.

In September 2009 Antauro Humala was sentenced to 25 years in prison but, it was reduced to between 17 and 19 years in prison. On 14 May 2011, Antauro Humala filed a lawsuit against journalist Jaime Bayly claiming Bayly was "disseminating inaccurate versions" of the events in 2005.

In 2012 the National Penitentiary Institute transferred him to the high-security Callao Naval Base for "repeated violations of penitentiary regulations". There he joined Abimael Guzmán and Vladimiro Montesinos. On 1 August 2012, his father Isaac Humala announced the publication of another book that Antauro had completed while imprisoned. Antauro's book De La Guerra Etnosanta A La Iglesia Tawantinsuyana laid out the need to create a neo-incan religion that would coalesce the many varied religious traditions, both classical and contemporary, of the Indigenous Andean peoples.

In February 2015, a report from the Directorate of Criminalistics of the National Police of Peru on the bodies of the four law enforcement officers who died in this coup, indicates that the bullets that caused their death came from above and behind, while Antauro Humala's group was ahead of them. The argument that there are witnesses claiming that the deaths were caused by military snipers from the government of Alejandro Toledo turns out to be contradictory, because it was supposedly an assault.

In October 2018, the Peruvian Patriotic Front was founded. In June 2019, Antauro Humala announced that the foundation of Patriotic Front is official.

In September 2019, he presented his request for conditional release before the National Penitentiary Institute of Peru, in which he is serving a 19-year prison sentence in the Virgen de la Merced de Chorrillos prison.

== Political views ==
Humala and his brother Ollanta call the movement they lead the "Movimiento Etnocacerista", which has been described as having fascist traits. Humala has been described as having ultranationalist and fascist leanings himself with analyst Carlos Meléndez of Diego Portales University stating that Humala's views adopt "fascistic features and with promises of a heavy hand, militaristic and a refoundational discourse with extreme radicalism".

== Personal life ==
His brother, Ollanta, has served as the 65th President of Peru (2011–2016). His other brother, Ulises Humala, has also run for the presidency.
