= José del Carmen Marín Arista =

Peruvian army officer

- Born: José del Carmen Marín Arista; March 2, 1899; Mendoza, Amazonas, Peru
- Died: November 6, 1980 (aged 81) Lima, Peru
- Allegiance: Peru
- Branch: Peruvian Army
- Service years: 1917–1957
- Rank: Divisional general
- Conflicts: Ecuadorian–Peruvian War: Battle of Zarumilla
- Alma mater: Chorrillos Military School

José del Carmen Marín Arista (March 2, 1899 – December 6, 1980) was a Peruvian general, cabinet minister and academic.

== Early life and military schooling ==
Marín was born in the Department of Amazonas in Peru. He went to the Chorrillos Military School in 1917, then was moved to the Top Division in 1918, graduating with honours in 1922.

In 1927, Marín graduated with a bachelor's degree in mathematical sciences from the National University of San Marcos. That same year, he graduated with honours (earning the second highest marks in his class) as a military engineer from the National Architecture School of Versailles, in France.

== Military career ==
In 1928, was assigned responsibility to set up an advanced training program for the Peruvian Signals Corp (Spanish: Servicio de Transmisiones), improving the standards for military communications and command and control in the armed forces.

From 1929 to 1933, Marín taught at the Officer Candidate School, first as instructing captain, then studies principal, then commandant of the school.

In 1934 Marín was promoted to major. He attended the Peruvian War College, receiving graduate-level instruction to prepare for senior leadership assignments and responsibilities. While there, Marín also taught some classes. He graduated at the top of his class, earning the Espada de España (Sword of Spain).

In 1937, Marín returned to Paris, attending France's Superior Officers War College, graduating with honorable mention and the highest grades. When he returned to Peru, he was appointed to a senior position with the Army General Staff (Spanish: Estado Mayor General del Ejército (EMGE)), a post he still held during the actions of the Ecuadorian–Peruvian War of 1941.

In 1946, Marín was promoted to brigadier general and appointed director of the Chorrillos Military School, a position he left in 1947 when the president of Peru, José Bustamante y Rivero, appointed Marín as minister of war in his cabinet.

In 1948, Marín chaired the Commission of Military Institutes, in charge of proposing a new set of fundamental policies upgrading the preparedness the Peruvian armed forces. This led to the creation of a cabinet-level Ministry of Defence in Peru, as well as the creation of the Center of Advanced Military Studies (Spanish: Centro de Altos Estudios Militares (CAEM)). The CAEM was created in 1950, with Marín as its first Commandant.

In December 1952, Marín became commandant of the School of Applied Engineering. He later created the Leoncio Prado Military School, then was appointed as director of the Chorrillos Military School.

In December 1956, Marín was promoted to major general. He retired from the military in January 1957, though he continued as an academic adviser for the CAEM for three years.

== Continued academic career ==
After Marín's retirement from the military, he did continue working in public academia, building on the work in advanced education he had championed throughout his time with the Peruvian armed forces.

Marín was the principal professor at the National University of Engineering, teaching there for 32 years, retiring as professor emeritus. He was a professor at the High Command School of the Air Force of Peru, from its inception, and also of the Peruvian Diplomatic Academy. Marín was a member of the National Academy of Mathematical and Physical Sciences, and president of the Institute of Natives Language.

Marín died on December 6, 1980.

== Honors ==
=== National honors ===
- Peru
  - Grand Cross of the Military Order of Ayacucho
  - Grand Officer of the Order of the Sun of Peru
  - Peruvian Cross of Aeronautical Merit
  - Order of the Magisterial Palms of Peru
  - Order of Merit of the Investigative Police of Peru
  - Grand Cross of the Order of Merit of the Peruvian Civil Guard

=== International honors ===
- Argentina
  - Buenos Aires Peace Conference Medal
- Bolivia
  - Order of the Condor of the Andes of Bolivia
- Chile
  - Grand Cross of the Order of Merit
- France
  - Commandeur of the Legion of Honour
- Paraguay
  - National Order of Merit
- Venezuela
  - Order of the Liberator

While he was still alive, Marín was made an honorary professor of the Universidad San Luis Gonzaga. A state school located in the facilities of the ex-barracks of Santa Catalina, in Lima, is named after him.
