= Battle of Zarumilla =

Battle of the 1941 Ecuadorian–Peruvian War

Zarumilla offensive
- Part of the Ecuadorian–Peruvian War
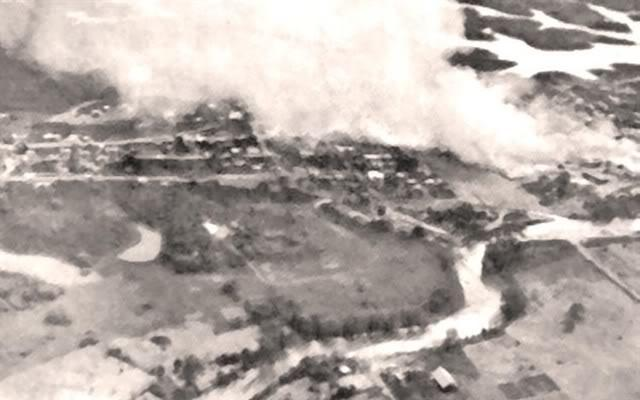
- Peruvian bombardment of Arenillas
Date	23–31 July 1941
Location	Zarumilla Province (Peru) and El Oro Province (Ecuador)
Result	Peruvian victory; Blockade of the Ecuadorian coast by the Peruvian Navy in Guayaquil; Ceasefire declared by Ecuador after of lose the Yaupi and Santiago offensive
Territorial changes	Start of Peruvian occupation of the Southern Ecuador during the rest of the war

Belligerents
Peru	Ecuador (surrendered)

Commanders and leaders
Manuel Odría; Eloy Ureta; José Marín; Manuel Urteaga; Hector Tudela; Jesús Polar Valdivia	Luis Rodríguez; Rafael Morán Valverde; Víctor Naranjo Fiallos; Galo Molina † (Note: Posthumously ascended to Major.); Carlos Díaz † (Note: Posthumously ascended to Captain.)

Units involved
Peruvian Army: Northern Army Detachment: 1st Infantry Battalion; 3rd Infantry Battalion; 5th Infantry Battalion; 19th Infantry Battalion; 31st Infantry Battalion; 5th Cavalry Group; 7th Cavalry Group; 6th Artillery Group; Peruvian Air Force: 1st Northern Air Force Detachment: 21st Fighter Squadron; 41st Squadron; 105th Transport Squadron; Paratrooper Company; Peruvian Navy: BAP Almirante Villar; BAP Coronel Bolognesi; BAP Almirante Guise	Ecuadorian Army: 5th Infantry Brigade: 12th Infantry Battalion Montecristi; Cayambe Battalion; Tulcan Battalion; Guayaquil Battalion; Carchi Battalion; Sucre Battalion; Huaquillas Garrison; Ecuadorian Navy: BAE Abdón Calderón; BAE Aviso Atahualpa

Strength
Peruvian Army: Japanese volunteers (Note: While Japanese Peruvians were considered a foreign element by Ecuador due to their recent immigration into Peru, the participation of mercenaries from Japan itself was also alleged.); Peruvian Civil Guard; Peruvian Navy; Peruvian Air Force	Ecuadorian Army; Ecuadorian Navy

Casualties and losses
37+ killed and wounded 1 destroyer damaged (Note: According to Ecuador.)	1,000 killed 300–500 wounded 200 captured 1 gunboat damaged (Note: According to Peru.); 1 boat captured Several weapons and military equipment seized captured
- 2 Peruvian civilians killed

The Battle of Zarumilla or Zarumilla offensive was a military confrontation between Peru and Ecuador that took place from July 23 to 31 during the 1941 Ecuadorian–Peruvian War.

== Background ==
Hostilities between Peru and Ecuador began on July 5, 1941, when fire was exchanged between both parties. The events themselves, however, are disputed. According to Ecuador, a group of Peruvians, including policemen, crossed the Zarumilla River into Ecuadorian territory. The Peruvian policemen are then said to have fired first when a border patrol was spotted. According to Peru, the Ecuadorian Army shot first at local Civil Guard troops, which exchanged fire for 30 minutes, holding back a potential advance and waiting for reinforcements. After July 5, hostilities along the border continued. As a result, on the night of July 6, the senior commander of the Ecuadorian Army ordered the formation of the 5th Infantry Brigade in El Oro, under the command of Colonel Luis Rodríguez.

== Battle ==
The Peruvian offensive began on July 23, being carried out by the newly formed Northern Army Detachment headed by General Eloy G. Ureta with the purpose of pushing north into El Oro Province to prevent more skirmishes along the disputed border.

=== Quebrada Seca ===
On July 23, 1941, the 41st Peruvian Squadron took off from Tumbes to fulfill a mission, under the command of Lieutenant Commander Antonio Alberti and made up of Lieutenants Fernando Paraud, José A. Quiñones and Manuel Rivera, aboard their North American NA-50 or Toritos fighter planes. The mission consisted of bombing the Ecuadorian post of Quebrada Seca, where they had concentrated the bulk of their anti-aircraft artillery and placed machine guns.

According to Peruvian accounts, instead of parachuting to safety, Quiñones chose to crash his damaged aircraft into the Ecuadorian position, rendering the battery out of action. This version of events has been subsequently called into question by Ecuadorian military authorities, who have stated that there were no anti-aircraft guns in the area. The other planes that made up Squadron 41 continued with their mission and carried out a subsequent attack, returning to Tumbes.

=== Jambelí ===
The Peruvian destroyer Almirante Villar set sail from Zorritos with the mission of entering Ecuadorian waters and carrying out patrolling and reconnaissance tasks in the area. It was then that, being in the vicinity of the Jambelí channel, the Ecuadorian gunboat Abdón Calderón was spotted. The Ecuadorian ship, which was in transit to Guayaquil, turned 180º with respect to its course as soon as it recognized the Peruvian ship, fleeing towards Puerto Bolívar while firing shots. Admiral Villar did the same, maneuvering in circles avoiding getting too close to the coast due to its shallow depth. After 21 minutes of both sides exchanging fire, the incident ended.

=== Puerto Bolívar ===
On July 23, Peruvian aircraft carried out a strategic bombing of the port city. On the next day, aircraft returned to attack the Aviso Atahualpa patrol boat, located in the docks of the city. The fact that the patrol boat was the target as well as the subsequent defense of it carried out by Ecuadorian troops prevented valuable explosives located nearby from being attacked and ignited.

On July 28, Peruvian submarines R-1 and R-2 carried out a reconnaissance mission at the mouth of the Jambelí Strait in order to detect the presence of artillery. The following day, cruisers Coronel Bolognesi and Almirante Guise, during a patrol in front of the Jambelí Strait, bombed Punta Jambelí and Puerto Bolívar, in preparation for the Peruvian advance on El Oro.

On July 31, prior to the cease fire that was to be effective on that date, an order was given to capture the city of Puerto Bolívar, which was accomplished using paratroopers from the newly formed Paratrooper Company of the Peruvian Air Force. The use of said paratroopers was decisive in the capture of the city and served as a surprise factor since, only a handful of countries had a unit of said type, such as Germany with their Fallschirmjäger, making Peru the first country in the Western Hemisphere to deploy paratroopers, being followed by Argentina in 1944.

== Aftermath ==
After the ceasefire, a Civil Administration was established in the occupied province of El Oro by Peru. A month later, on October 2, a bilateral ceasefire was signed which also established a demilitarized zone between both states.

By the time the ceasefire had been accepted, the cities bombarded by Peru included Santa Rosa, Machala and Puerto Bolívar. Peruvian aircraft had reached Guayaquil in at least two different occasions, but the squadron sent to the city limited itself to dropping propaganda leaflets, which were republished by Peruvian newspapers La Industria and El Tiempo.

A fire began in Santa Rosa on August 1, 1941, which destroyed over 120 houses.

The government of Ecuador, led by Dr. Carlos Alberto Arroyo del Río, signed the Rio de Janeiro Protocol on January 29, 1942, with which Ecuador officially renounced its claim to a sovereign outlet to the Amazon River.

On February 12, 1942, Peruvian troops vacated the Ecuadorian province of El Oro.

== Gallery ==
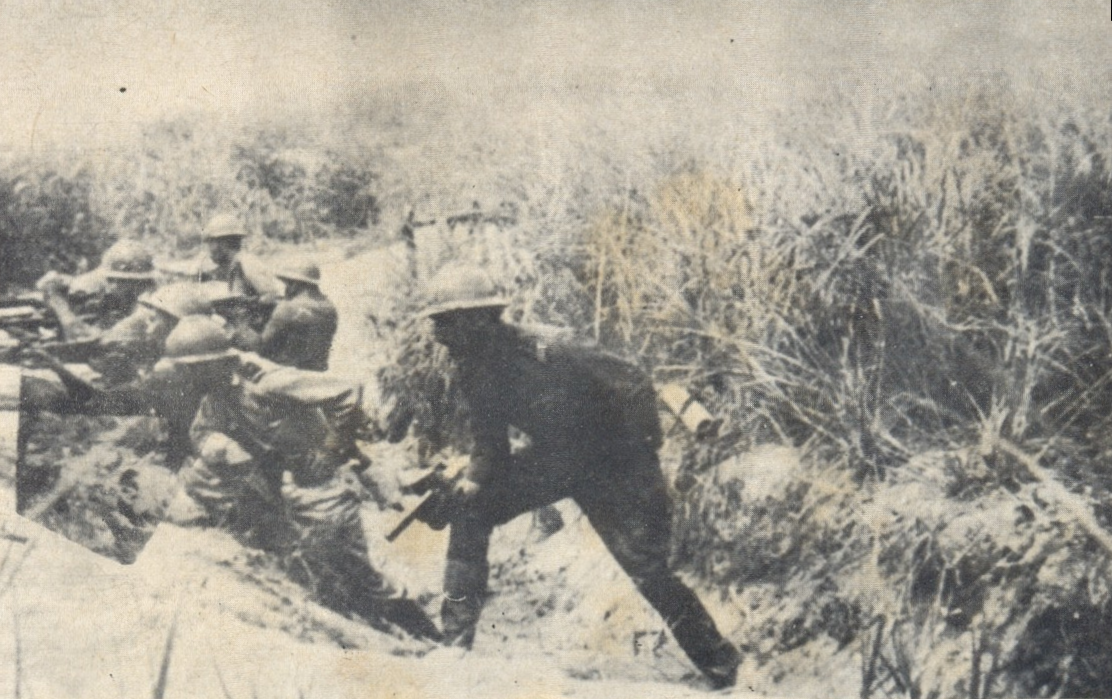
Peruvian troops during a battle in Tembleque Island

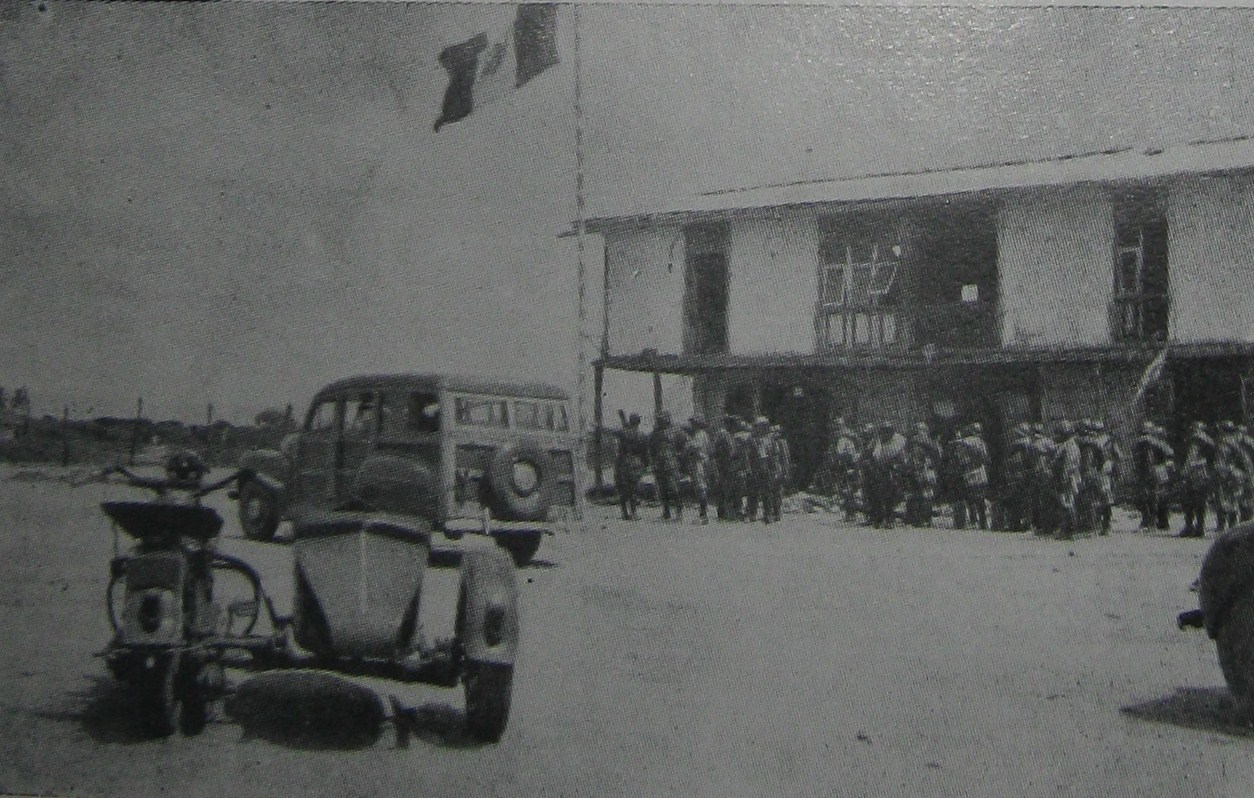
A captured Ecuadorian outpost in Chacras.

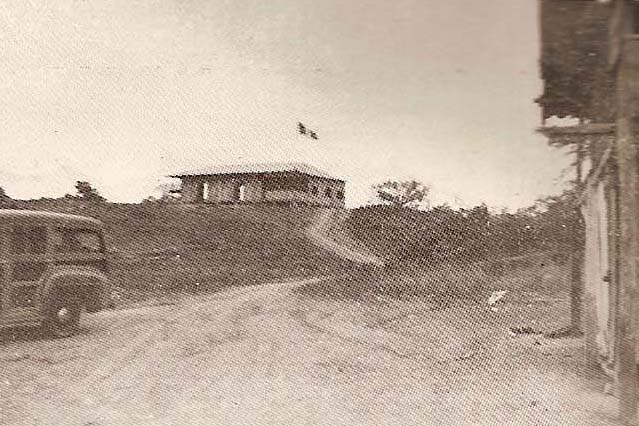
The Peruvian flag flies over Quebrada Seca.

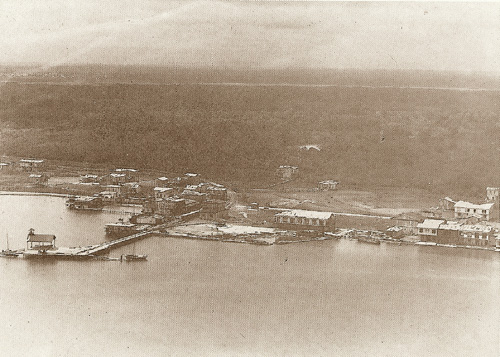
Reconnaissance photo of Puerto Bolívar prior to its invasion.

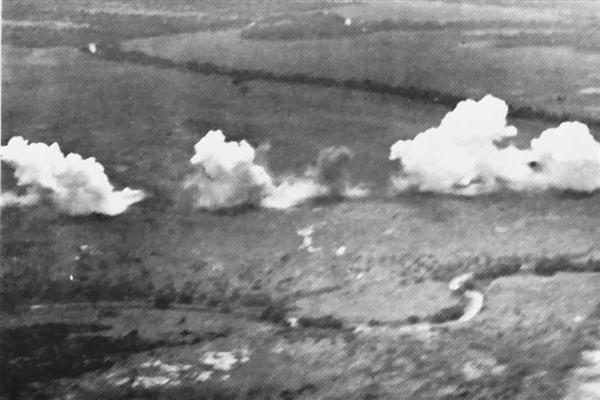
Bombing of Ecuador by Peruvian aircraft

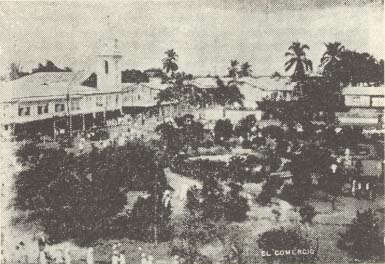
The town of Santa Rosa prior to its invasion

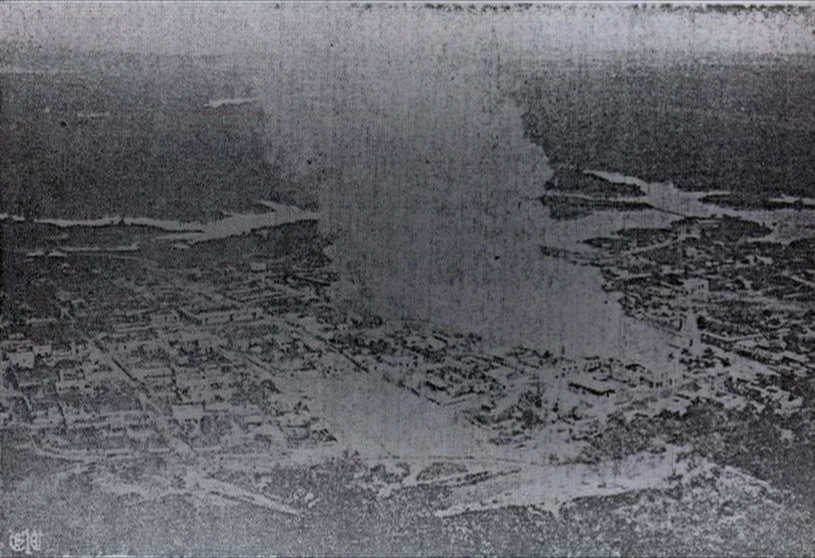
Santa Rosa during the fire.

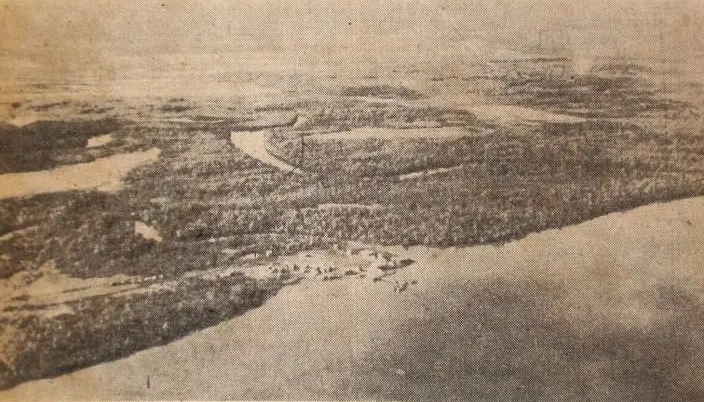
The Ecuadorian coast during the Peruvian occupation on the 31st.

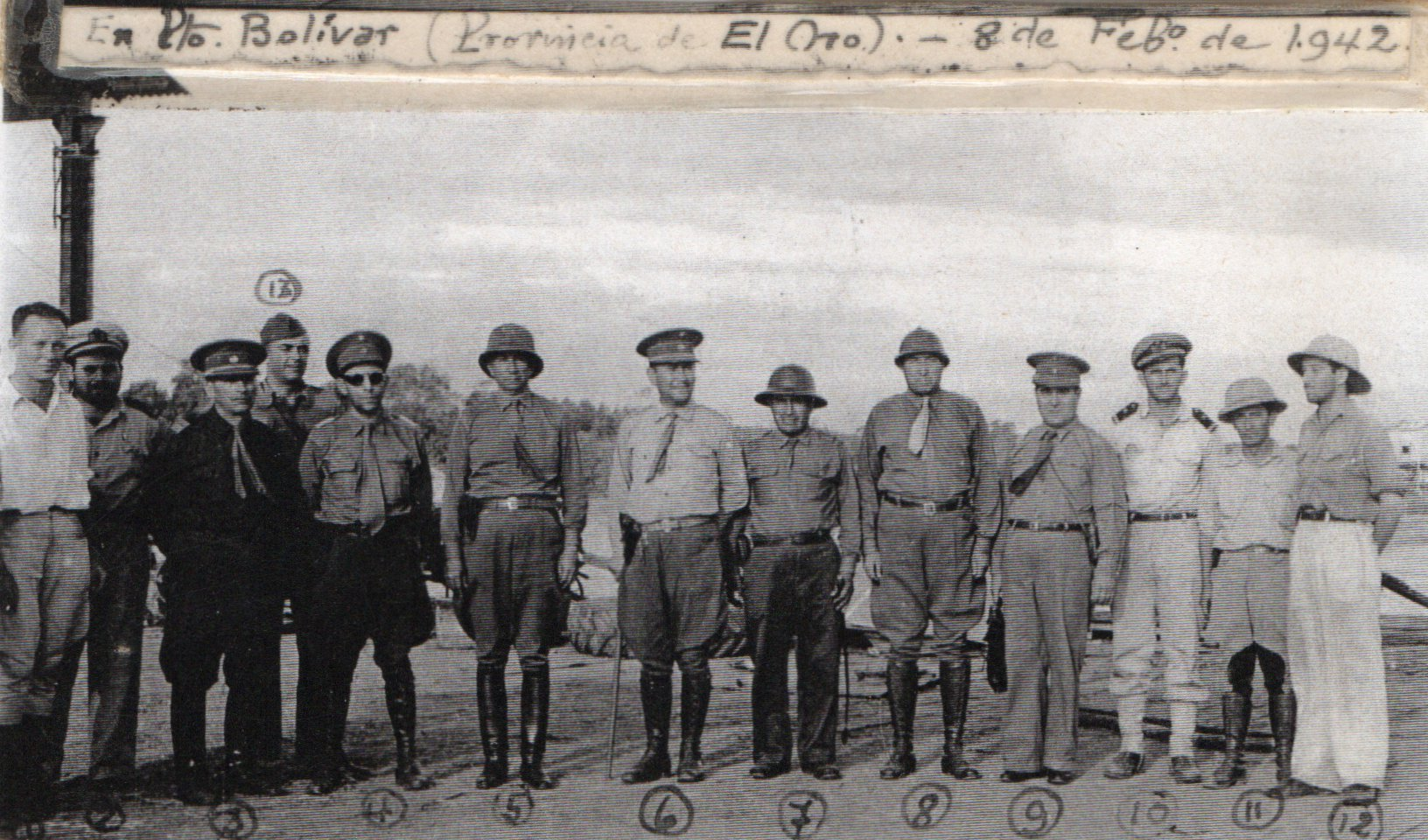
Peruvian troops in Puerto Bolívar during the occupation. Future president Manuel A. Odría can be seen among them.

== See also ==
- Alerta en la frontera, a documentary film filmed during the war that went unreleased until 2014 due to the Rio de Janeiro Protocol

== Bibliography ==
- Rodríguez S., Luis (1955). La agresión peruana documentada. Quito: Casa de la Cultura ecuatoriana.
