= Paratrooper Company =

Paratrooper branch of the Peruvian Air Force

Historic Company "72nd Paratrooper Squadron"
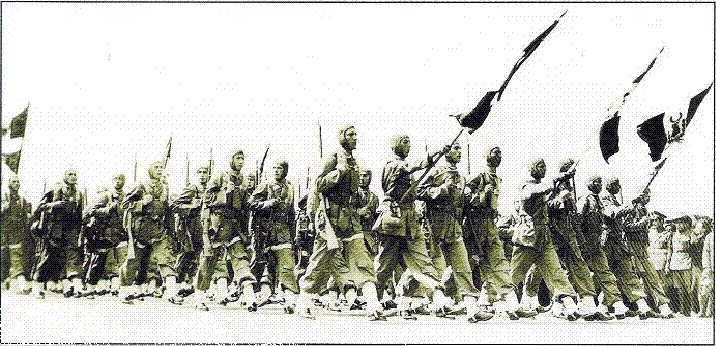
- Members of the unit marching in Lima
- Active: 1939 – present
- Country: Peru
- Branch: Peruvian Air Force (Note: The Peruvian Air Force was known as the Aeronautical Corps of Peru until July 18, 1950.)
- Type: Light infantry Airborne infantry
- Garrison/HQ: Las Palmas Air Base
- Engagements: Ecuadorian–Peruvian War: Battle of Zarumilla
- Commander: Cpt. Augusto Duarte Colichón; 2nd Lt. Jesús Polar Valdivia

The Historic Company "72nd Paratrooper Squadron" (Spanish: Compañía Histórica "72 Escuadrilla de Paracaidistas"), formerly simply the Paratrooper Company (Spanish: Compañía de Paracaidistas), is the paratroop branch of the Peruvian Air Force, based in Las Palmas Air Base.

Formed in 1939, it saw combat during the Ecuadorian–Peruvian War, when it seized the Ecuadorian port city of Puerto Bolívar on 27 July 1941, marking the first time in the Americas that airborne troops were used in combat.

== History ==
=== Background ===
On 27 March 1927, Enrique Tavernie Entelador became the first Peruvian paratrooper when he leapt from an Avro aircraft, piloted by Captain Clifford, from a height of 2,000 meters over Las Palmas Air Base (then Las Palmas Aerodrome). Subsequently, on 10 May 1928, Second Lieutenant César Álvarez Guerra voluntarily jumped from a height of 3,000 meters, becoming the first military paratrooper. Major Fernando Melgar Conde and Sergeant 1st. Jose Pineda Castro followed on 16 May 1928, when they jumped over Las Palmas at altitudes of 2,000 and 4,300 meters, respectively. On 24 May of that year, Ensign Peter Griva, of the seaplane service from Ancon, jumped from a height of 2,000 meters.

=== Formation ===
The first Parachute School opened in 1939, with now Colonel Guerra in command. José Quiñones attended this school. In the same year the unit was formed.

On 14 November 1940, Sgt. Lázaro Orrego became the first casualty of the unit when his parachute failed to open while doing exercises in Ancón.

=== Ecuadorian–Peruvian War ===
The unit became well known during the Ecuadorian–Peruvian War when paratroopers Antonio Brandariz Ulloa, Carlos Raffo García and Armando Orozco seized the city of Puerto Bolívar in southern Ecuador prior to the declaration of a ceasefire on July 31, 1941, concluding the Peruvian offensive in El Oro Province.

=== Later history ===
The unit has marched in its traditional grey uniform as part of the Air Force's troops during the Grand Military Parade held annually.

== See also ==
- History of Paratrooping
- Sinchis, a similar unit of the National Police of Peru, formerly the Civil Guard.
