= José Quiñones Gonzales =

Peruvian military aviator (1914–1941)

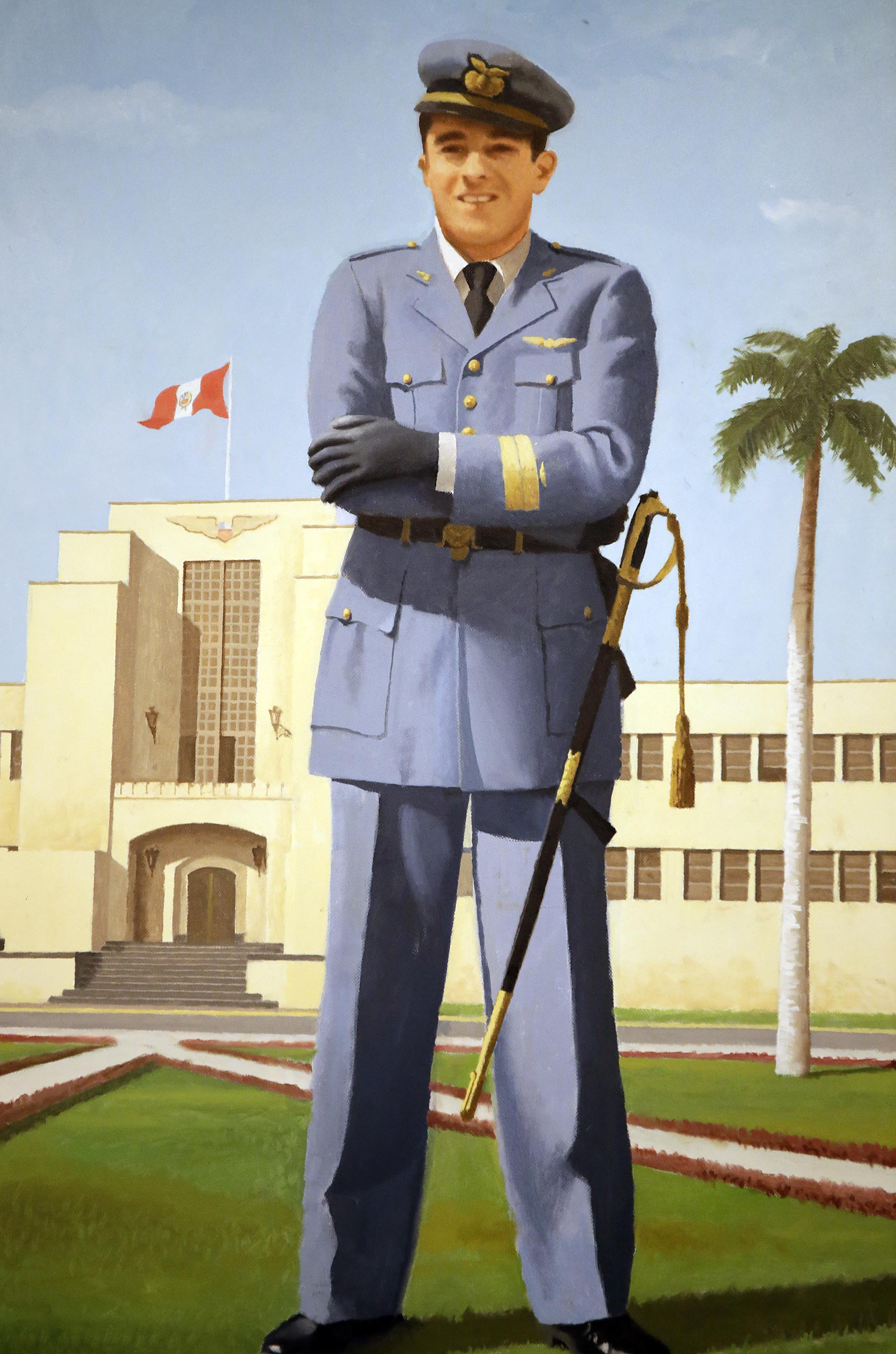
- Born: April 22, 1914; Pimentel, Lambayeque, Peru
- Died: July 23, 1941 (aged 27) Quebrada Seca, Peru
- Allegiance: Peru
- Branch: Peruvian Aeronautical Corps: Paratrooper Company
- Service years: 1935–1941
- Rank: Grand General of the Air of Peru (posthumous)
- Conflicts: Ecuadorian–Peruvian War; Battle of Zarumilla †

José Abelardo Quiñones Gonzáles (April 22, 1914 – July 23, 1941) was a Peruvian military aviator who posthumously became a national hero for his actions at the Battle of Zarumilla during the Ecuadorian–Peruvian War of 1941.

== Early life ==
Quiñones was born in the port city of Pimentel on April 22, 1914. His parents were José María Quiñones Arízola and María Juana Rosa Gonzales Orrego. He was the third legitimate child of three brothers.

His primary studies were at a local school run by nuns, and then at the Colegio Nacional San José de Chiclayo. The rector of the school, Karl Weiss, promoted gliding, an activity that Quiñones, along with other classmates, had become fond of, excited by the exploits of outstanding figures of Peruvian civil aviation, such as Jorge Chávez and Juan Bielovucic.

In 1928, by decision of his parents, he moved to Lima and began his secondary education at the Colegio Sagrados Corazones Recoleta, until the second year in 1929. He finished his remaining years at the College of Our Lady of Guadalupe, attending from 1930 to 1932. Despite his parents' fierce opposition, he decided to join the Peruvian Aeronautical Corps.

== Military career ==
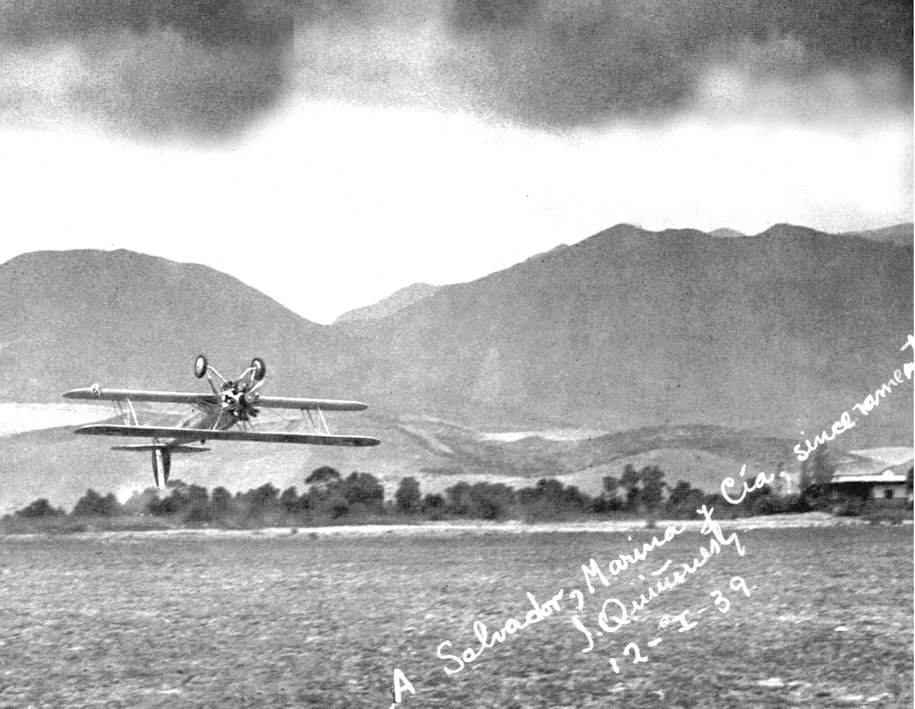
Quiñones' inverted flight

In 1935, he entered the Jorge Chávez Central Aviation School as a cadet and joined the Comandante CAP José Lucas Raguz Verán class. In officers' school he stood out for his ability to adapt to different piloting and aviation techniques. Four years after entering, he was received as an ensign on January 21, 1939, as the first of his promotion in the specialty of fighter pilot. In merit of this, he received the "Golden Wing" of the Air Force. During the aerial display that he gave on his graduation day, he amazed those present with an inverted flight almost one meter above the ground, which can still be seen on film today.

As an aviation officer, he was assigned to the No. 4 Squadron in Ancón. After four months, he was transferred to Las Palmas Air Base and from there to the 21st Fighter Squadron of the First Air Group, located in the city of Chiclayo. He had a dog named Hawk, whom he took with him when he flew.

Quiñones was part of the 41st Squadron of North American NA-50 aircraft and was part of the first High Aerobatics Squadron. When the paratrooper unit was created and after intense training, he made jumps from the skies of Chiclayo.

=== Combat history ===
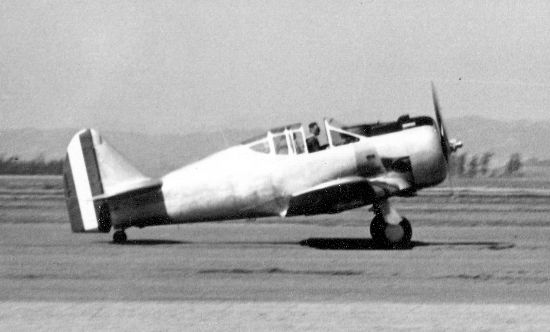
NA-50 "Torito", similar to that flown by Lt. Quiñones on July 23, 1941.

Lieutenant Quiñones was a fighter pilot of the 41st Escuadrilla (Squadron), Peruvian Air Force, and was part of a section carrying out a low-level strafing/bombing attack against Ecuadorian forces at Quebrada Seca on July 23, 1941. During the raid, Quiñones' aircraft, a North American NA-50 "Torito" (North American P-64) nicknamed Pantera, was mortally hit by ground fire from a battery of Ecuadorian anti-aircraft artillery.

According to Peruvian accounts, instead of parachuting to safety, Quiñones chose to crash his damaged aircraft into the Ecuadorian position, rendering the battery out of action. This version of events has been subsequently called into question by Ecuadorian military authorities, who have stated that there were no anti-aircraft guns in the area.

== Posthumous ==
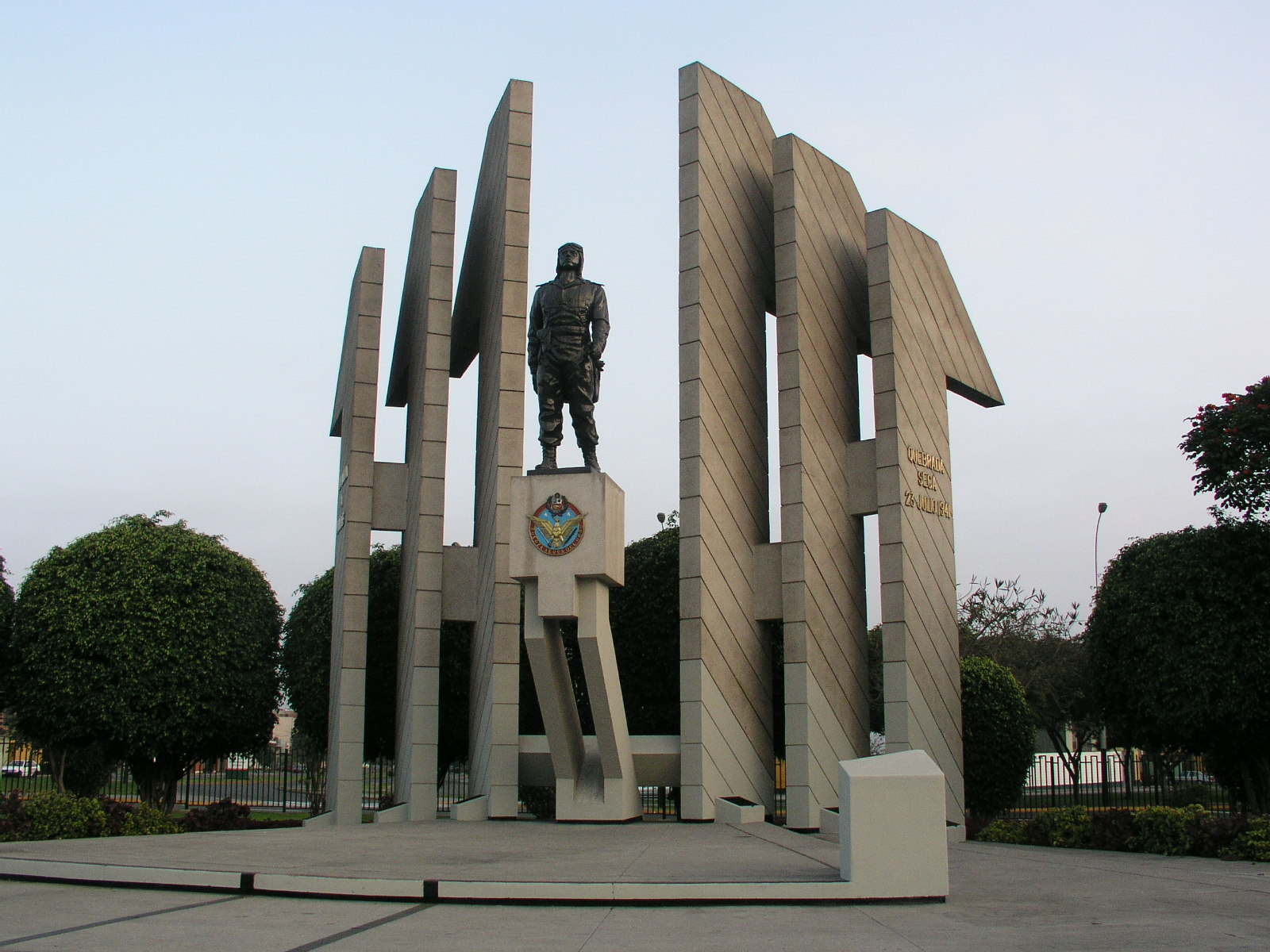
Monument in San Isidro, Lima

Following his death, Quiñones was promoted to the rank of Air Force Captain and he was declared a national hero by law on May 10, 1966. Named in his honour is the FAP Captain José Abelardo Quiñones González International Airport near his town of birth in Chiclayo. When the new currency of Peru was introduced in 1991, Gonzales appeared on the 10 sol Banknote. He was also the subject of the banknote of 500 soles de oro issued in 1976.
