= Alerta en la frontera =

Peruvian film

- Title card
- Directed by: Kurt Herrmann
- Produced by: Nacional Films del Peru; Peruvian Army
- Narrated by: Ricardo Villarán
- Cinematography: Manuel Trullen; Pedro Valdivieso
- Music by: Manuel Cabanillas; Julio Barrionuevo
- Distributed by: Nacional Films del Peru
- Release date: 1941
- Running time: 70 minutes
- Country: Peru
- Language: Spanish

Alerta en la frontera (Spanish: Alert in The Frontier) is a 1941 (Note: Its original release date was either September or December 17, 1941) Peruvian propaganda film about the Ecuadorian–Peruvian War. It was directed by German director Kurt Herrmann.

== Plot ==
The film features pictures of daily life in Lima during the 1940s, including the post-war victory parade in the National Stadium of Peru with president Manuel Prado Ugarteche attending. It also features scenes from the conflict, including the Occupation of Puerto Bolívar.

== Release ==
Originally meant to be a newsreel, the amount of material shot developed into the need to make a feature film. The film was originally scheduled to release in 1941, but due to the Rio Protocol, the Peruvian government censored the film and kept all known copies. The film was reportedly screened once, however, in the Peruvian city of Pisco by the city's mayor (and also one of the film's producers) in 1941. After its screening, the filmreels were taken by the Peruvian Army.

It was not until 70 years later that the film was found in the archive warehouses of the Center for Military Historical Studies. After its discovery, it was screened in the district of Miraflores during the Sobre héroes y tumbas exhibition, finally premiering at the 2014 Lima Film Festival.
