= Puerto Bolívar =

Port city in Ecuador

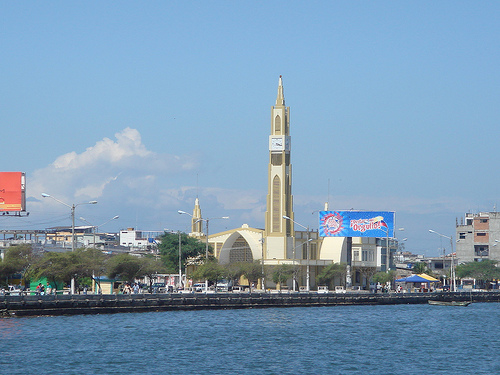

- Location within Ecuador
- Country: Ecuador
- Province: El Oro
- Canton: Machala
- Founded: December 18, 1883 (as Puerto Bolívar)
- Elevation: 6 m (20 ft)

Population (2010)
  - Total: 6,174
- Time zone: UTC-5 (PET)
- Website: www.puertobolivar.gob.ec

Puerto Bolívar is an urban parish and port city, part of the municipality of Machala, El Oro Province, Ecuador. Puerto Bolívar is one of the world's largest shipment points for bananas, most of them destined for Europe; about 80% of Ecuador's banana production is shipped through these port facilities.

== History ==
Banana freighter in Puerto Bolívar

A port established under Spanish rule under the name Puerto Pilo (later changing its name in 1783 to Puerto Machala) served as the precursor to Puerto Bolívar. Initially a berth, it later established itself as a point of commerce between Machala and Guayaquil.

After the cacao boom in Ecuador and the sedimentation of Puerto Pilo, Ecuadorian authorities sought to develop the Machala area, finally deciding in 1869 to establish a new port near Jambelí island called Puerto Huaylá. In 1879 a dock was built in the new port.

On December 18, 1883, the port was officially inaugurated as Puerto Bolívar in honor of Libertador Simón Bolívar, with new infrastructure, such as a railroad beginning to be built to connect the port to Machala on the same year. The port was elevated to a Major Port on April 13, 1897, and a main dock was built in 1902, which, along with the railroad, formed the first intermodal transport between El Oro and Guayas.

=== Ecuadorian–Peruvian War ===
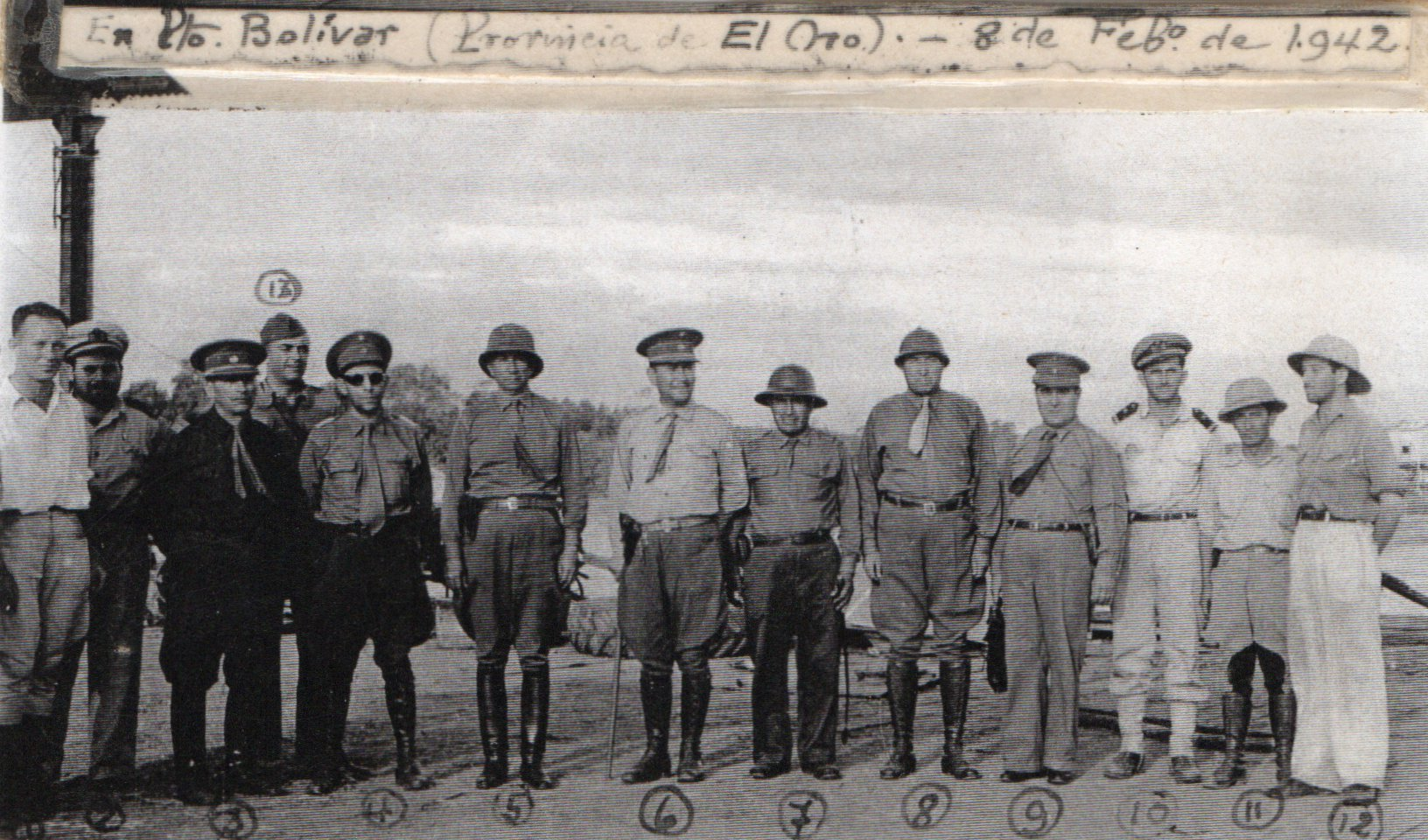
Peruvian troops, including future president Manuel Odría, during the occupation in 1942

After some skirmishes on early July 1941, a war between Ecuador and Peru saw a Peruvian offense being carried out on late July of the same year. The Peruvian army had established a paratrooper unit in 1939 and successfully used it to seize the port on July 27, marking the first time in the Americas that airborne troops were used in combat.

After the war, the agricultural development of El Oro Province improved the local economy in the following years, and the port was further expanded for overseas exports from 1964 to 1968. A port authority was established in 1970, which started operations the following year.

Ecuador and Peru signed a peace agreement in 1998, with resulted in the increase of commercial trade between the two countries. The cargo in transit through the docks of the port increased, especially from the north of Peru, for the North American and European markets. The Binational Group for the Promotion of Private Investment (GBPIP) was formed to encourage the creation of a complementary binational port axis of the ports of Paita in Peru and Puerto Bolívar in Ecuador to increase maritime and land trade between the two countries.

By 2008 the port was composed of three main docks, over 50,000 km2 of storage and around 53,000 km2 of parking, as well as a anti-narcotics building.

== Climate ==
Climate data for Puerto Bolívar, elevation 6 m (20 ft), (1971–2000)
Month	Jan	Feb	Mar	Apr	May	Jun	Jul	Aug	Sep	Oct	Nov	Dec	Year
Mean daily maximum °C (°F)	29.4 (84.9)	30.3 (86.5)	30.0 (86.0)	30.0 (86.0)	28.6 (83.5)	26.4 (79.5)	25.5 (77.9)	25.3 (77.5)	26.0 (78.8)	26.2 (79.2)	27.4 (81.3)	28.9 (84.0)	27.8 (82.1)
Mean daily minimum °C (°F)	23.5 (74.3)	23.9 (75.0)	24.0 (75.2)	24.1 (75.4)	23.6 (74.5)	21.9 (71.4)	21.2 (70.2)	20.7 (69.3)	21.1 (70.0)	21.6 (70.9)	22.3 (72.1)	23.3 (73.9)	22.6 (72.7)
Average precipitation mm (inches)	44.0 (1.73)	39.0 (1.54)	59.0 (2.32)	30.0 (1.18)	8.0 (0.31)	3.0 (0.12)	0.0 (0.0)	1.0 (0.04)	1.0 (0.04)	1.0 (0.04)	1.0 (0.04)	1.0 (0.04)	188 (7.4)
Average relative humidity (%)	81	81	81	81	82	85	86	86	86	85	84	82	83
Source: FAO

== See also ==
- Refrigerator ships
- United Fruit Company
