= Quebrada Seca River =

River in Peru

Quebrada Seca

Location
- Country: Peru

Physical characteristics
- Source: Department of Moquegua
  - elevation: 3,047 m (9,997 ft)
- Mouth: Department of Tacna
  - elevation: 293 m (961 ft)
- Length: 78.86 km (49.00 mi)

The Quebrada Seca River is a river in Peru.
