= Ecuadorian–Peruvian War =

1941 South American border conflict

Ecuadorian–Peruvian War Guerra del 41
- Part of the Ecuadorian–Peruvian Conflicts
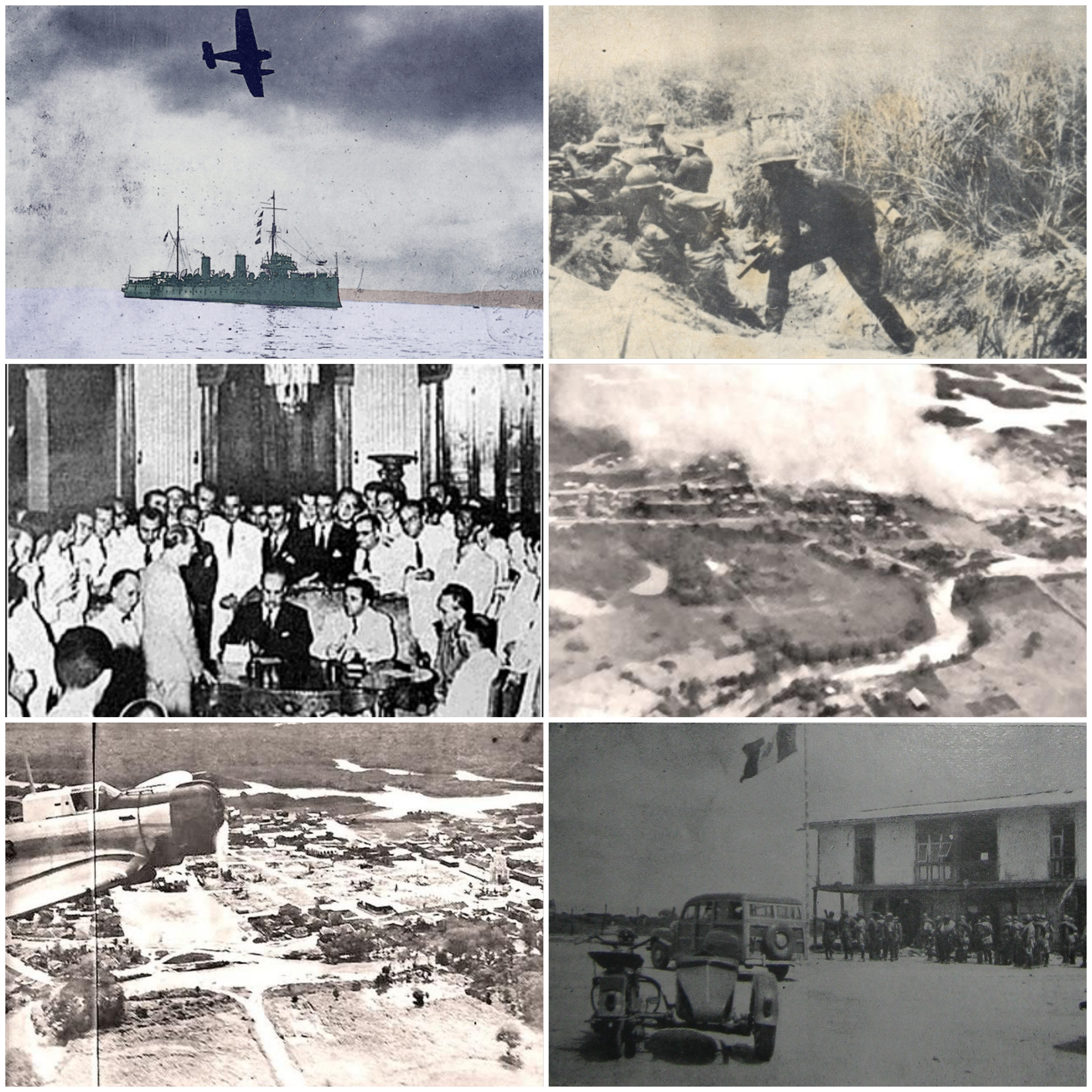
- Clockwise from top: Peruvian plane escorting a ship · Peruvian soldiers holding a position · Bombing of Arenillas · Ecuadorian border outpost captured · View of El Oro · Signing of the peace treaty
Date	5 July 1941 – 2 October 1941 (combat) (2 months, 3 weeks and 6 days)
Location	Southern Ecuadorian provinces of El Oro, Loja, Santiago Zamora and Napo Pastaza
Result	Peruvian victory; Rio de Janeiro Protocol in 1942; The border conflict with Ecuador continues until the Alto Cenepa War
Territorial changes	Peruvian occupation of the Ecuadorian southern provinces and complete loss of the claimed territory

Belligerents
Peru	Ecuador

Commanders and leaders
(Peru) Manuel Prado (Peru) Eloy G. Ureta (Peru) Marciano Ramirez	(Ecuador) Carlos Alberto Arroyo (Ecuador) Luis Rodríguez

Strength
5 July 1941: 10,000 troops 11 tanks 24 guns (from the Agrupamiento del Norte)	In Amazonia: 5,300; 8 guns In Quito: 12,000; Total: 17,300 troops

Casualties and losses
310 killed & wounded	3,000+ killed & wounded

The Second Ecuadorian–Peruvian War, usually called simply the Ecuadorian–Peruvian War, and known locally as the War of '41 (Spanish: Guerra del 41), was a South American war fought between 5 July to 2 October of 1941. It was the first of three military conflicts between Ecuador and Peru during the 20th century.

During the war, Peru occupied the western Ecuadorian province of El Oro, parts of the Andean province of Loja and all the Amazon disputed territory. Although the war took place during World War II, it is unrelated to that conflict, as neither country was supported by either the Allies or the Axis. (Note: In 1945, both countries formally joined the Allied side)

A ceasefire agreement between the two countries came into effect on 31 July 1941, but Peru soon broke it. A new ceasefire agreement came into effect on 2 October ending the clashes. Both countries signed the Rio Protocol on 29 January 1942, and Peruvian forces subsequently withdrew. Enmity over the territorial dispute continued after 1942, and the border disputes were not entirely resolved until the Cenepa War of 1995 and the signing of the Brasilia Presidential Act agreement in October 1998.

== Background ==
The territorial dispute between Ecuador and Peru dated from before Ecuador's independence, as part of a broader dispute between what was then Gran Colombia and Peru. It revolved around whether Ecuador's territory extended beyond the Andes mountain range to the Marañon (Amazon) river, including the Amazonian basin.

The lack of resolution of the dispute, despite several attempts by both parties, led to several conflicting treaties being signed between different parties to the conflict, including Colombia and Brazil, and led to war on several occasions. The first of these armed conflicts took place in 1828, when Peru fought against Gran Colombia in the Gran Colombia–Peru War. After the dissolution of Gran Colombia, the conflict resumed with Ecuador, with skirmishes taking place often and the first Ecuadorian–Peruvian War taking place between Ecuador and Peru from 1857 to 1860.

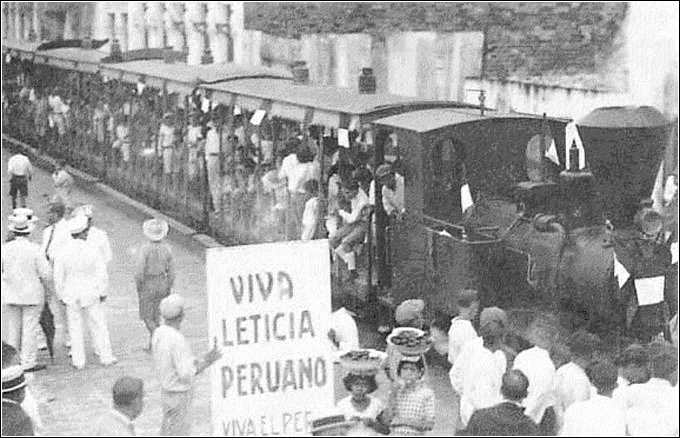
Peruvian protesters opposing the transfer of Leticia.

The dispute was again brought into the spotlight after the signing of the Salomón–Lozano Treaty in March 1922 by the governments of Colombia and Peru, which at that time was ruled by Augusto B. Leguía. The treaty, which was kept secret, set the boundary between Peru and Colombia as the Putumayo River, with the exception of a small strip of land controlled by the city of Leticia that would connect Colombia to the main flow of the Amazon River. With that, Colombia effectively recognized Peruvian control of the rest of the disputed region south of the Putumayo River.

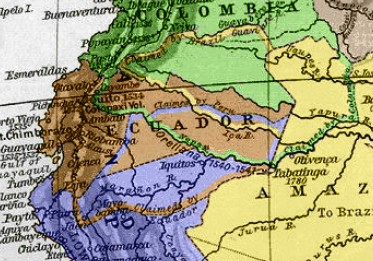
Map of the dispute between Brazil, Colombia, Ecuador and Peru.

Following the coup d'état against Leguía by troops under the command of Luis Miguel Sánchez Cerro, the treaty was made public and caused much anger among the Peruvian population, which perceived that the treaty awarded Colombia a section of Peruvian territory. This dispute over the Amazon region controlled by Leticia would eventually lead to a short war between Colombia and Peru from 1932 to 1933. The conflict over Leticia, which was populated by both Peruvian and Colombian colonists, was resolved after Sanchez Cerro was assassinated and the new Peruvian president Óscar R. Benavides accepted the 1934 Rio Protocol which upheld the Salomón–Lozano Treaty and finally put an end to the border disputes between Colombia and Peru.

The Salomón–Lozano Treaty was unpopular in Ecuador as well, which found itself surrounded on the east by Peru, which claimed the territory as an integral part of its republic. Further adding to Ecuador's problems, the Colombian government now also recognized Peru's territorial aspirations as legitimate, and had nominally granted to Peru an area in Sucumbíos which had been claimed by Ecuador.

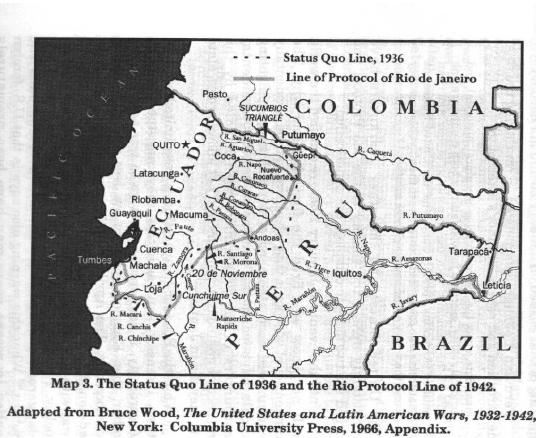
Ecuadorian–Peruvian border in 1936

An agreement was signed in 1936 which recognized territories in de facto possession by each country. The resulting border was known as the 1936 status quo border line.

However, by 1938 both nations were again initiating minor border skirmishes. That same year, the entire Ecuadorian Cabinet, which was composed of high-ranking army officers who served as advisors for General Alberto Enríquez Gallo (who had taken charge of government after a military coup d'état), resigned from government in order to take command of the Ecuadorian Army. Meanwhile, in Quito, there were public demonstrations of people chanting "Down With Peru! Long Live Ecuador!".

Peru's response to the events taking place in Ecuador was provided by foreign minister Carlos Concha Cárdenas, who stated, "In Peru we have not yet lost our heads. Our country is in a process of prosperous development and the Government heads would have to be completely mad to think of war." Peru at that time was undergoing major changes, with the social reforms begun by president Augusto B. Leguia (which he claimed were aimed at improving roads, sanitation, and industrial development, and promoting the general welfare of Peru's indigenous population) being continued by President General Oscar Benavides. Peru's government claimed to be attempting to run on a balanced budget, but Peru still held a large debt in spite of its positive foreign trade. However, despite this, Peru began to mobilize its troops to the Ecuador border in response to deployment of Ecuadorian troops in the disputed zone.

On 11 January 1941, alleging that Ecuador had been carrying out incursions into, and even occupations of, the Peruvian territory of Zarumilla, the Peruvian president, Manuel Prado, ordered the formation of the Northern Army Detachment (Spanish: Agrupamiento del Norte), a military unit in charge of the Northern Operational Theatre.

== Forces involved ==
=== Ecuador ===
According to the testimony of Col. Luis Rodríguez, the Ecuadorian forces at the disposal of the Army Border Command in El Oro (Lieutenant Colonel Octavio A. Ochoa) after the incidents of 5 and 6 July were as follows:

- Forces deployed along the Zarumilla river: 3 superior officers, 33 officers, and 743 men, organized as follows:
  - "Cayambe" Battalion: 2 superior officers, 22 Officers, 490 soldiers.
  - "Montecristi" Battalion: 1 superior officer, 11 Officers, 253 soldiers.
- Forces deployed in the immediate rear: 4 superior officers, 40 officers, 28 soldiers, 93 volunteers, 500 carabineros (a paramilitary Government force), organized as follows:
  - At Arenillas: 2 superior officers, 3 Officers, 14 soldiers.
  - At Santa Rosa: 2 superior officers, 1 Officer, 18 soldiers, plus the 93 volunteers, and the 500 carabineros.

=== Peru ===
As a result of the rising tensions on the border during 1939 and 1940, the Peruvian President Manuel Prado authorised in December 1940 the creation of the Agrupamiento del Norte (Northern Army Detachment). By July 1941, this unit was ready to begin active military operations.

Peruvian order of battle

Order of Battle, Agrupamiento del Norte, July 1941

- Group Headquarters (Commander in Chief: Gen. Eloy G. Ureta; Chief of Staff: Lieut. Col. Miguel Monteza)
  - 5th and 7th Cavalry Regiments
  - 6th Artillery Group (8 105 mm guns)
  - Army Tank Detachment (12 Czechoslovak LTP tanks)
- 1st Light Infantry Division (Col. Luis Vinatea)
  - 1st, 5th, 19th Infantry Battalions
  - 1st Artillery Group (8 guns)
  - 1st Engineer Company
  - 1st Antiaircraft Section
- 8th Light infantry Division (Col. César Salazar)
  - 20th Infantry Battalion
  - 8th Artillery Group (8 guns)
  - 8th Engineer Company
- Army Detachment "Chinchipe" (Lieut. Col. Victor Rodríguez)
  - 33rd Infantry Battalion (2 Light Infantry companies)
- Army Jungle Division (Northeast) (Gen. Antonio Silva)

Figures for total strength of the Agrupamiento del Norte at the beginning of offensive operations have been put at 11,500 to 13,000 men.

== War ==
=== July 5 incident ===
The first shots of the conflict were fired on July 5 1941; the parties disagree about who fired the first shot. According to Ecuadorian Colonel Luis A. Rodríguez (the commander of the Ecuadorian forces defending the province of El Oro during the war), a group of Peruvian civilians, including policemen, crossed the Zarumilla River onto Ecuadorian soil. Rodríguez claimed that the Peruvian policemen opened fire on an Ecuadorian border patrol they spotted, killing one soldier. This was followed by the widespread exchange of fire between troops on the opposing banks of the Zarumilla, while two Ecuadorian officers sent to Aguas Verdes to speak with the Peruvian local commanding officer were rebuffed by the Peruvian authorities. According to Peruvian accounts, Ecuadorian Army soldiers from the garrison of Huaquillas (a town on the bank of the Zarumilla River, which then served as the status quo line at the western end of the Ecuadorian-Peruvian border), crossed into the Peruvian border post at Aguas Verdes, a town directly in front of Huaquillas, and opened fire on a Peruvian Civil Guard patrol. These troops were then followed by some 200 Ecuadorian armed men, which attacked the police station at Aguas Verdes for 30 minutes, to which the Peruvians reacted by sending an infantry company to Aguas Verdes and driving the Ecuadorians back across the Zarumilla. In any event, fighting then spread to the entire border area along the Zarumilla River. By 6 July, Peru was conducting airstrikes against the Ecuadorian border posts along the river. After the 5th, hostilities along the border continued. As a result, on the night of July 6, the senior commander of the Ecuadorian Army ordered the formation of the 5th Infantry Brigade in El Oro, under the command of Colonel Luis Rodríguez.

=== Zarumilla Offensive ===
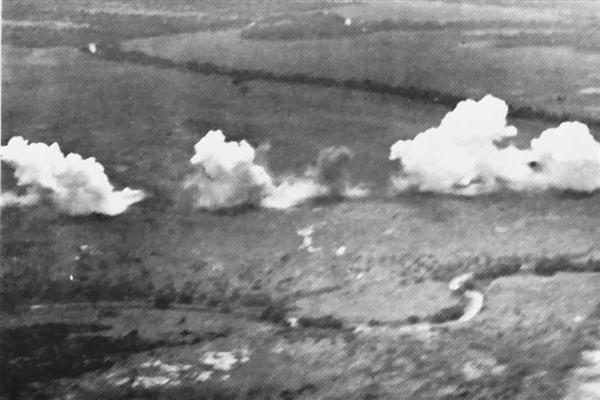
Peruvian bombardment of Arenillas

The Peruvian offensive against Ecuador began on July 23, being carried out by the newly formed Northern Army Detachment, headed by General Eloy G. Ureta with the purpose of pushing north into El Oro Province with the stated purpose of preventing more skirmishes along the disputed border. On that day, the 41st Peruvian Squadron took off from Tumbes to fulfill a mission, under the command of Lieutenant Commander Antonio Alberti and made up of Lieutenants Fernando Paraud, José A. Quiñones and Manuel Rivera, aboard their North American NA-50 or Toritos fighter planes. The mission consisted of bombing the Ecuadorian post of Quebrada Seca, where they had concentrated the bulk of their anti-aircraft artillery and placed machine guns.

According to Peruvian accounts, instead of parachuting to safety, Quiñones chose to sacrifice himself by crashing his damaged aircraft onto the Ecuadorian position, rendering the battery out of action. This version of events has been subsequently called into question by Ecuadorian military authorities, who have stated that there were no anti-aircraft guns in the area. The other planes that made up Squadron 41 continued with their mission and carried out a subsequent attack, returning to Tumbes.

On July 24, a battle between Peruvian and Ecuadorian troops took place in Chacras, where the latter set up a resistance against the Peruvians. Due to constant Peruvian attacks, the defensive position eventually gave way and the post was overrun.

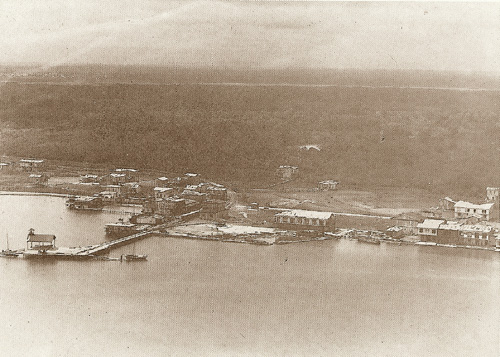
Reconnaissance photo of Puerto Bolívar prior to its invasion.

On July 23, Peruvian aircraft carried out strategic bombing of the port city. On the next day, aircraft returned to attack the Aviso Atahualpa patrol boat, located at the docks of the city. This patrol boat drew bomb targeting away from valuable explosives located nearby which could have been attacked and ignited.

On July 28, Peruvian submarines BAP Islay (R-1) and BAP Casma (R-2) carried out a reconnaissance mission at the mouth of the Jambelí Strait to search for the presence of artillery. The following day, cruisers Coronel Bolognesi and Almirante Guise, during a patrol in front of the Jambelí Strait, bombed Punta Jambelí and Puerto Bolívar in preparation for the Peruvian advance on El Oro.

=== La Tina–Macará Front ===
The La Tina–Macará Front, extending from the Quebrada de Pilares to La Tina and Chinchipe, was the responsibility of the Peruvian 8th Light Division, under the command of Colonel EP César A. Salazar Cartagena.

==== Battle of Macará ====
Battle of Macará
Date	25–28 July 1941
Location	Macará, Ecuador
Result	Peruvian victory Peruvian forces take Macará, then withdraw on 30 July

Belligerents
Peru	Ecuador

Commanders and leaders
César Yánez; Fernando del Risco	Raúl Espinoza

Units involved
Macará Detachment; La Tina garrison	Macará Detachment

Strength
450 men	60 men

Casualties and losses
3+	18+ dead 9+ missing

According to Peruvian accounts, Macará had a large number of Peruvians, who saw themselves targeted by the Ecuadorian population. On July 25, news reached Peru that the Peruvian Consulate had been stoned and the Peruvian coat of arms dragged away. The Peruvian military authorities of La Tina protested and asked for an explanation, sending a sergeant and two soldiers to receive an answer after a two-hour ultimatum. They were greeted with a burst of machine-gun fire which killed the sergeant and wounded the other two soldiers. According to Ecuador, the coat of arms fell off on its own and was moved by the consul himself. Following the event, news did reach Peru on the alleged events, but Ecuadorian authorities managed to communicate with the Peruvian consul, who offered to explain the events to the Peruvian side. However, hours later the consul instead abandoned the city along with his family. The Ecuadorians also disputed the reasoning behind the provocations by the Ecuadorian side, as it was well known that Peruvian troops had organized themselves near the city, and news had reached the area of the events taking place in El Oro province.

Prior to the battle, the civilian population was evacuated, with some volunteers remaining to assist the Ecuadorian Army. Fire was exchanged beginning at 2 p.m. Peruvian Commander César Yánez, head of the 7th Cavalry Regiment, supported by a company from the 19th Infantry Battalion and a battery from the 8th Artillery Group, crossed the river on July 28 and took Macará, encountering little opposition. Later, with the support of the company commanded by Captain Fernando del Risco, the Ecuadorian Army remnants in nearby Vado Limón were also defeated. The town was subsequently occupied by Peruvian forces, looted, and vacated two days later, when the Peruvian troops returned to their emplacements.

==== Battle of Cazaderos, Progreso and Huasimo ====
Battle of Cazaderos, Progreso and Huasimo
Date	29 July 1941
Location	Cazaderos, Progreso and Huasimo, Ecuador
Result	Peruvian victory

Belligerents
Peru	Ecuador

Commanders and leaders
	Eliecer Nájera †; Carlos Orbe †

Units involved
Huasimo: 1 Civil Guard group	

On July 29, the Ecuadorian border outposts of Cazaderos and Progreso were attacked by Peruvian troops, but the attacks were repelled. At the nearby Ecuadorian Huasimo outpost, Peruvian and Ecuadorian troops also fought; the Ecuadorians had to retreat, leaving behind weapons and equipment.

==== Battle of 25 July ====
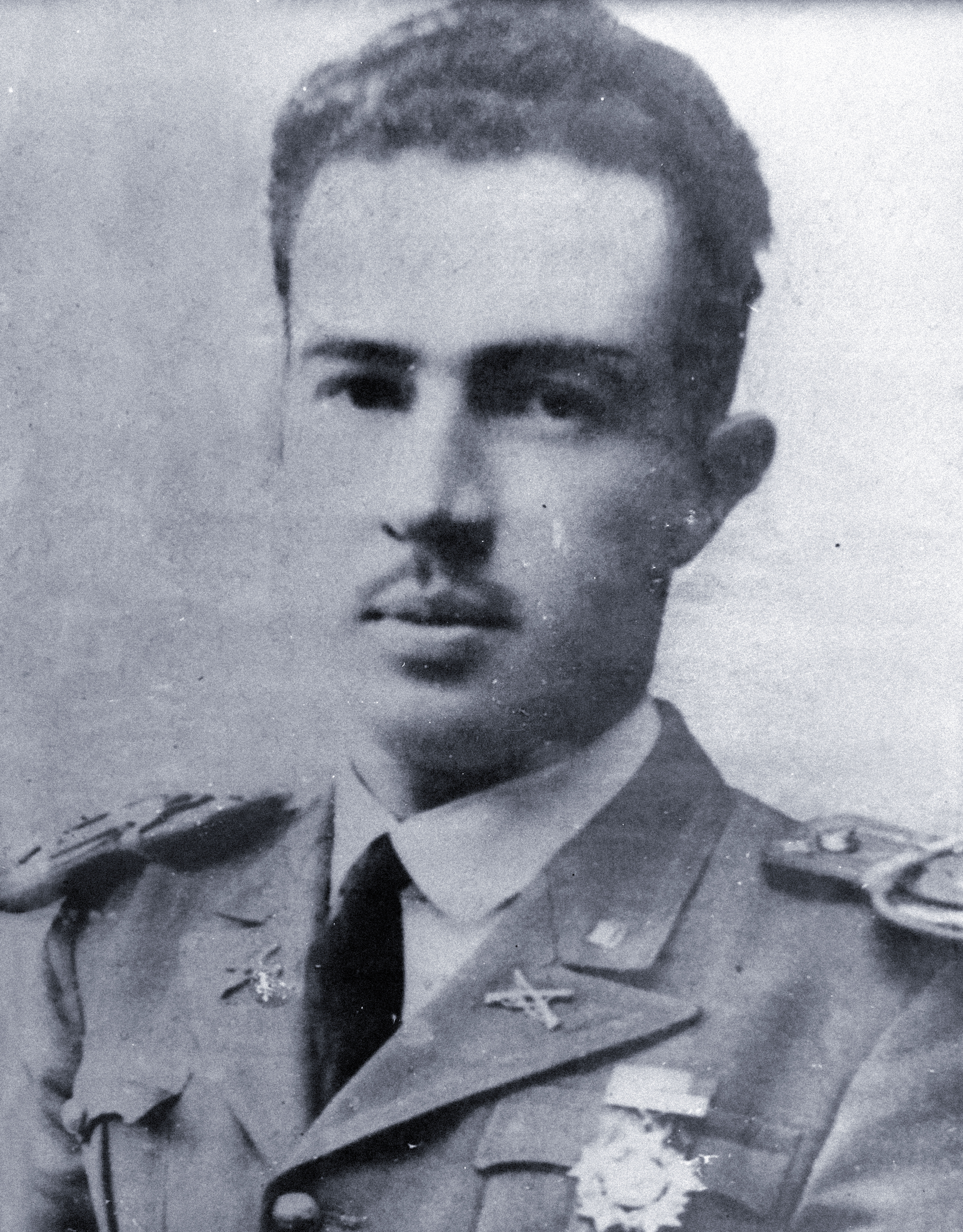
Chiriboga, circa 1941.

On July 25, in the Chacras sector, strong Peruvian contingents preceded by a tank surrounded a group of 25 soldiers commanded by Ecuadorian Lieutenant César Edmundo Chiriboga González, who refused to surrender and fought to the death, along with his troops. In the place where he and his men died, the Peruvians put together a cross with a plaque that read, "Lieutenant César E. Chiriboga González and 25 soldiers, fallen on 25 July 1941, in the line of duty."

The cross was found in the aftermath of the war, after Peruvian troops had retreated from southern Ecuador. Due to his actions, Chiriboga was posthumously promoted to captain and declared a national hero of Ecuador.

=== Yaupi–Santiago offensive ===
Yaupi–Santiago offensive
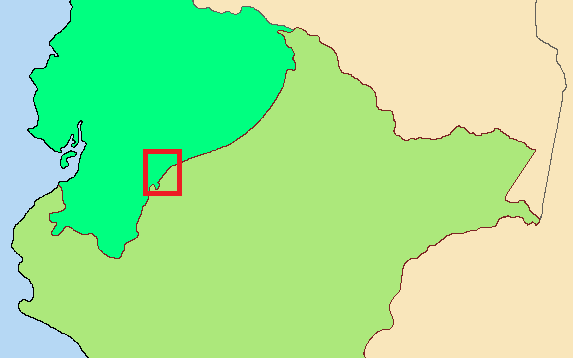
- Location of the offensive
Date	31 July–11 August 1941
Location	Yaupi–Santiago rivers, Ecuador
Result	Peruvian victory: Peru controls both rivers

Belligerents
Peru	Ecuador

Commanders and leaders
Pedro Rivadeneyra	Alberto Mazón (POW); Hugo Garcés †; Salvador Veloz (POW)

Units involved
"Stte. Castro" garrison "Cahuide" outpost	"Ecuador" Battalion

Strength
100–300 men	5–12 men (July 31); 11 men (August 1); 8 men (11 August)

Casualties and losses
Unknown	30 killed & captured

Despite the agreed ceasefire, there were armed clashes in the Amazon area, with the Peruvian troops of the Jungle Division launching, between 1 and 2 August 1941, an offensive against the Ecuadorian garrisons located on the Yaupi and Santiago rivers.

==== Battle of Yaupi River ====
According to Second Lieutenant Hugo Ortiz Garcés, who would be killed the next day, the Ecuadorian Yaupi outpost and its Gazipum garrison was attacked from 31 July to 1 August 1941, by no less than 100 soldiers from the Peruvian Army, armed with eight machine guns.

==== Battle of Santiago River ====
On 2 August 1941, in Gapizum, on the banks of the Santiago River, the Ecuadorian post of ten soldiers, commanded by 20-year-old Second Lieutenant Hugo Ortiz Garcés, was again attacked and, unlike the previous day, overrun by Peruvian forces. Ortiz refused to surrender and was killed in action by the Peruvian soldiers, who buried him wrapped in the flag of the small Ecuadorian detachment in charge of guarding the Yaupi area. His remains were moved to Quito in 1943.

=== Battle of August 11 ===
The reinforcements requested by Ortiz Garcés arrived and began to approach the Yaupi River only a week later. The unit, commanded by Corporal Salvador León Veloz and made up of eight soldiers, began to approach the Yaupi River on August 11, when they were attacked by Peruvian soldiers. After half an hour of combat, the Ecuadorians were defeated, consolidating the Peruvian domain in the Yaupi and Santiago rivers.

=== Naval Campaign ===
The Peruvian Navy had an advantage over the ill-equipped Ecuadorian Navy. The results favored Peru, such as in the successful blockade of Guayaquil.

On July 25, the Peruvian destroyer Almirante Villar set sail from Zorritos with the mission of entering Ecuadorian waters and carrying out patrol and reconnaissance tasks in the area. The Ecuadorian gunboat Abdón Calderón was spotted in the vicinity of the Jambelí channel. The Ecuadorian ship, which was in transit to Guayaquil, turned 180° as soon as it recognized the Peruvian ship, fleeing towards Puerto Bolívar while firing. Admiral Villar did the same, maneuvering in circles avoiding getting too close to the coast due to its shallow depth. After 21 minutes of fire, the battle ended.

=== Air Campaign ===
The Peruvian Air Force was more numerous and technologically more advanced than its Ecuadorian counterpart. The core of Peruvian aviation was made up of a squadron of five NA-50 fighters, known as Toritos, which were a version of the North American P-64 and had been delivered by the United States in May 1939. As in the case of armored vehicles, Ecuador practically lacked combat aircraft; at the beginning of hostilities, the Ecuadorian Air Force had only six Curtiss-Wright CW-19R Sparrow aircraft, and three IMAM Ro.37 reconnaissance and attack biplanes that were in poor condition. Peru carried out limited aerial bombing of the Ecuadorian towns of Huaquillas, Arenillas, Santa Rosa, and Machala.

On July 31, prior to the cease fire that was to be effective on that date, the Peruvians were ordered to capture the city of Puerto Bolívar, which was accomplished using paratroopers from the newly formed Paratrooper Company of the Peruvian Air Force. The use of said paratroopers was decisive in the capture of the city and was a surprise, since only a handful of countries had paratrooper units, such as Germany with their Fallschirmjäger, making Peru the first country in the Western Hemisphere to deploy paratroopers, followed by Argentina in 1944. The paratroopers were dropped from Italian Caproni Ca.111 bomber-transports.

=== Blockade of Guayaquil ===
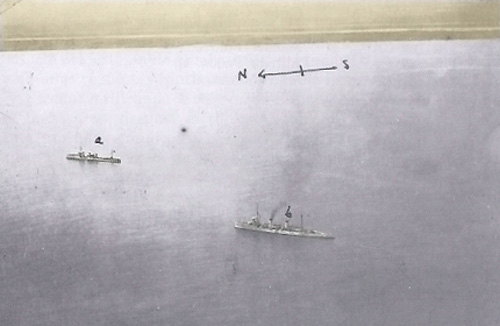
Peruvian ships during the blockade of the Ecuadorian coast

On 31 August 1941, and facing a delicate political and national security situation, President of Ecuador Carlos Alberto Arroyo del Río decided to retain a considerable part of the Ecuadorian Army to protect the capital, Quito. This military order was given due to intelligence reports coming from the intelligence services of Brazil, Chile, and the United States, informing President Arroyo del Río and the Ecuadorian military high command that Peru was less than 48 hours from Guayaquil, leaving from Machala and Puerto Bolívar, the second port of Ecuador.

The Peruvian troops were less than 170 km from the Guayaquil metropolitan area. If Ecuador did not accept Peru's rights over the disputed territories, the Peruvian military intended to assault and capture the first port of Ecuador. Once Guayaquil was occupied, the Peruvian forces in the occupied part of the Ecuadorian highlands would leave from Loja, which is less than 600 km from the capital, and would occupy Quito, an operation that would take a maximum of 10 days, since the Ecuadorian armed forces had practically ceased to exist in September.

By the end of August 1941, Peru occupied the coast: the provinces and cantons of El Oro, Puerto Bolívar and began the blockade of Guayaquil, the main commercial port and naval base of Ecuador. In the mountains, the provinces and cantons of Loja and Zamora Chinchipe were occupied.

In the jungle, the armed forces of Peru claimed Sucumbios, Napo and Pastaza in the regions that corresponded to the former Government of Quijos, which, according to the Royal Decree of July 15, 1802, passed to the Viceroyalty of Peru and, according to the Peruvian version, Ecuador had occupied, taking advantage of the fact that Peru was facing Chile in the War of the Pacific of 1879. The territory of Sucumbíos had been nominally transferred to Peru in 1922 by Colombia as a result of the Salomón–Lozano Treaty, but the act was not recognized by Ecuador.

Faced with the threat to the Ecuadorian state, with Ecuadorian President Carlos Alberto Arroyo del Río keeping a sizable part of the Army in Quito, Ecuador promptly requested a ceasefire, which went into effect on 31 July 1941.

== Occupation ==
The Peruvian occupation of Ecuador was formally established after the ceasefire of 31 July 1941, having existed since the Peruvian occupation began with the Zarumilla offensive on July 23. After the ceasefire, a civilian administration was established in the occupied province of El Oro by Peru. A month later, on October 2, the Talara Accord (Spanish: Acuerdo de Talara) was signed, through which a bilateral ceasefire was put into place. The treaty also established a demilitarized zone between both states, which would be under the Ecuadoran administration, and the observation of military representatives of the mediator countries that also signed the agreement: the United States, Brazil and Argentina. Other countries involved in the mediation included the Vatican, which had acted both directly between both countries and in conjunction with the other mediators, and to a lesser extent, Chile and Mexico. The topic of Pan-Americanism was raised, with countries such as Ecuador proclaiming their allegiance to the movement, and other countries, such as Vichy France, criticizing it, arguing that it only served to increase American influence in the continent.

By the time the ceasefire had been accepted, the cities bombarded by Peru included Santa Rosa, Machala and Puerto Bolívar. Peruvian aircraft had reached Guayaquil in at least two different occasions, but the squadron sent to the city limited itself to dropping propaganda leaflets, which were republished by Peruvian newspapers La Industria and El Tiempo.

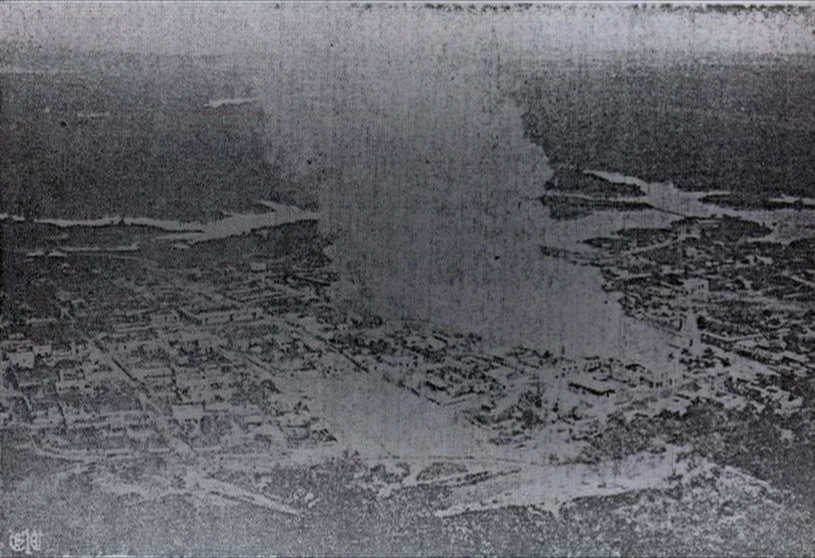
Santa Rosa during the fire

A fire began in Santa Rosa on 1 August 1941, which destroyed over 120 houses. Both sides blamed each other for the fire, with the Peruvian newspaper El Comercio blaming the retreating Ecuadorian troops with a report that claimed that locals had heard an Ecuadorian commander ordering that the area was burned to a crisp. The town was referred to as the "Lidice of America" by Italian writer Leonelly Castelly due to the scale of the destruction of the area being similar to that of the Czech town.

The Peruvian administration immediately started efforts in order to exploit the newly acquired territories in southern Ecuador. A civil administration was established in order to provide a sense of normalcy to the Ecuadorian citizens that lived under occupation, which relieved the military from certain efforts. A large effort from the Northern Army Detachment during this period also went into repairing and maintaining infrastructure, such as highways and railroads, which would in turn be used to the advantage of the Peruvian Army. This effort was so intense that less than half a year later, the province had been transformed from its war-torn state.

The Ecuadorian government also launched a diplomatic campaign, through which the Peruvian state was characterized as an expansionist state, attacking its neighbors by force and expanding its territories, also intending to strengthen its ties to Spain, which had remained neutral during the conflict. Peru, on the other hand, disputed the expansionist claims, claiming that the country had no intention of acquiring new territory, intending the occupation to be temporary since the beginning. During the conflict, Japan was accused of supplying Peru with weapons on more than one occasion, which increased the anti-Japanese sentiment in the country to the point where Japanese organizations complained to the Ecuadorian government, which released an official communiqué denouncing the accusation.

The Cantonal Council of Machala, through which the city and El Oro province were administered, moved from Machala to Guayaquil, along with several refugees from El Oro in general. Some refugees travelled north as far as Cuenca or Quito in lesser numbers. The number of refugees was reportedly so large that citizens were urged to take them in their homes, with their goods looted by Peruvian troops, and reportedly sent via plane, train or car to Tumbes. The nearby town of Tendales was one of the points where refugees travelled, either to settle in there or to leave for Guayaquil or further north. As time went on, the numbers of refugees overwhelmed the town, which was unable to provide for such a large number of people.

With a large number of people leaving, the city of Machala, which would serve as the headquarters for the Peruvian administration, was reportedly left virtually empty, as the majority of its inhabitants had left for the north. Also prior to the evacuation, a general state of disorder had taken over due to a lack of administration, with both countries reporting looting by some Ecuadorian troops fleeing north. Additionally, a resistance had been established by both Ecuadorian citizens and army members, through which acts of sabotage were carried out against the Peruvian occupying force. These acts ranged from lesser acts to armed confrontations between both parties that resulted in deaths on several occasions. These encounters were reportedly started by both sides up until the signing of the agreement that established the demilitarized zone on October 2.

=== End of the occupation ===
The Talara Agreement was signed on October 2, through which a bilateral ceasefire was agreed upon and enforced by both Ecuador and Peru. The treaty also established a demilitarized zone between both states, which would be under the observation of military representatives of the mediator countries that also signed the agreement, and would later sign the Rio Protocol in 1942: the United States, Brazil and Argentina.

The government of Ecuador, then led by Dr. Carlos Alberto Arroyo del Río, signed the Rio de Janeiro Protocol on 29 January 1942, with which Ecuador officially renounced its claim to a sovereign outlet to the Amazon River, finally establishing most of its border with Peru. As per the agreement, on 12 February 1942, Peruvian troops vacated the Ecuadorian province of El Oro. During this time, the orense government-in-exile had made the prior preparations in order to reestablish its administration of the province as soon as possible, such as the immediate reestablishment of a police force in order to establish a security body in the area, as well as the return of the refugees that had abandoned the province for the north of the country. The exiled Cantonal Council held its first plenary Session on January 18, six days after the withdrawal of Peruvian troops from Ecuador.

== Aftermath ==
After Japan's attack on Pearl Harbor Peru cut off diplomatic relations with the Axis powers, and aligned with the Allies.

The placement of the border markers along the definitive border line indicated by the Rio Protocol had not been completed when the Ecuadorians withdrew from the demarcation commissions in 1948; they argued that inconsistencies between the geographical realities and the instructions of the Protocol made it impossible to implement the Protocol until Peru agreed to negotiate a proper line in the affected area. Thus, some 78 km of the Ecuadorian-Peruvian border were left unmarked for the next fifty years, continuing to cause diplomatic conflict and military confrontations between the two countries.

Alerta en la frontera, a Peruvian propaganda film filmed during the war, went unreleased until 2014 due to the Rio de Janeiro Protocol.

In 1960, Ecuadorian President José María Velasco declared that the Rio Protocol was void. According to the Velasco Administration, the treaty, having been signed under Peruvian military occupation of Ecuadorian soil, was illegal and contrary to Panamerican treaties that outlawed any treaty signed under the threat of force.

However, this proclamation made little international impact, and was not followed by meaningful action; Peru and four other countries continued to consider the treaty valid. Peruvian analysts have speculated that President Velasco used the nullity thesis to gather political support with nationalist and populist rhetoric.

In 1981, the countries again clashed briefly in the Paquisha War. Only in the aftermath of the Cenepa War of 1995 was the dispute finally settled. On 26 October 1998, representatives of Peru and Ecuador signed a definitive peace agreement: the Brasilia Presidential Act.

== See also ==
- Ecuadorian–Peruvian territorial dispute
- Paquisha War – 1981
- Cenepa War – 1995
- List of conflicts in South America

== Bibliography ==
- Cortet, Pierre (October 2000). "Courrier des Lecteurs" [Readers' Letters]. Avions: Toute l'Aéronautique et son histoire (in French) (91): 4. ISSN 1243-8650.
- Rauch, Georg von (August 2000). "Marañon 1941: une guerre entre Pérou et Equateur" [Marañon 1941: The Peruvian-Ecuadorian War]. Avions: Toute l'Aéronautique et son histoire (in French) (89): 51–59. ISSN 1243-8650.
- Tincopa, Amaru (2019). Air Wars Between Ecuador and Peru: The July 1941 War. Vol. 1. Solihull, West Midlands: Helion and Company. ISBN 978-1-911628-67-5. OCLC 1079333059.
