= Peruvian Air Force =

Air warfare branch of Peru's military

- Fuerza Aérea del Perú
- Badge of the Peruvian Air Force
- Founded: 28 January 1919; 107 years ago
- Country: Peru
- Type: Air force
- Role: Aerial warfare
- Part of: Peruvian Armed Forces
- Nickname: FAP
- March: Himno de la Fuerza Aérea del Perú
- Engagements: 1932 Trujillo uprising; Colombia–Peru War; Ecuador–Peru conflict; War of 1941; Paquisha War; Cenepa War; Internal conflict in Peru
- Website: www.fap.mil.pe

Commanders
- Commander-in-Chief: Dante Antonio Arévalo Abate
- Chief of Staff: Julio Valdez Pomareda
- Inspector General: Javier Ramírez Guillen

Insignia
- Roundel

- Fin flash

- Flag

Aircraft flown
- Attack: Su-25
- Fighter: MiG-29, Mirage 2000
- Helicopter: Mil Mi-24, Mi-17
- Patrol: C-26B
- Reconnaissance: Learjet 36
- Trainer: KAI KT-1, CH 2000
- Transport: An-32B, C-130 Hercules, Y-12, Boeing 737, DHC-6, PC-6

The Peruvian Air Force (Spanish: Fuerza Aérea del Perú, FAP) is the branch of the Peruvian Armed Forces tasked with defending the nation and its interests through the use of air power. Additional missions include assisting in safeguarding internal security, conducting disaster relief operations and participating in international peacekeeping operations.

== History ==
=== 20th century ===
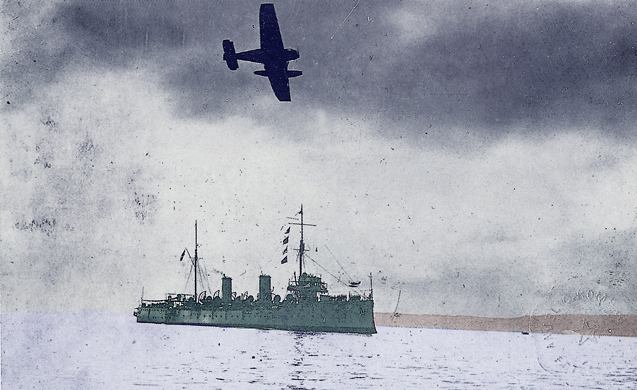
Peruvian Aeronautical Corps aircraft flying over a Peruvian ship during the 1941 war

On 20 May 1929, the aviation divisions of the Peruvian Army and Navy were merged into the Cuerpo de Aviación del Perú (Peruvian Aviation Corps, abbreviated CAP). During the Colombia-Peru War of 1933, its Vought O2U Corsair and Curtiss Hawk II biplanes fought in the Amazon region. The CAP lost three aircraft to the Colombian Air Force. The corps was renamed Cuerpo Aeronáutico del Perú (Peruvian Aeronautical Corps, also abbreviated CAP) on 12 March 1936.

==== Ecuadorian–Peruvian War ====
In 1941, the CAP participated in the Ecuadorian–Peruvian War. At that time, the CAP were equipped with Caproni Ca.114 and North American NA.50 Torito fighters, Douglas DB-8A-3P attack aircraft, and Caproni Ca.135 Tipo Peru and Caproni Ca.310 Libeccio bombers, among others.

The Peruvian Air Force had also established a paratroop unit during the war and used it to great effect by seizing the strategic Ecuadorian port city of Puerto Bolívar, on 27 July 1941, marking the first time in the Americas that airborne troops were used in combat.

Lieutenant José Quiñones Gonzales was a Peruvian pilot during the war. On 23 July 1941, his plane, a North American NA-50 fighter, was hit while performing a low-level attack on an Ecuadorian border post on the banks of the Zarumilla River. According to traditional Peruvian accounts, Quiñones, upon being hit by ground fire, crashed his damaged aircraft deliberately into the Ecuadorian anti-aircraft position, destroying it. He was promoted posthumously to captain, and is today considered a National Hero of Peru.

In 1942, an aerial photography service was annexed to the air force.

==== Cold War ====
During the 1950s presidency of General Manuel A. Odría, the Peruvian Air Force was reorganized and on 18 July 1950, had its name changed to the Fuerza Aérea del Perú (Air Force of Peru, or FAP). Peru was an ally of the United States during this period, and was predominantly equipped with aircraft built in the US and Great Britain. By the end of General Odria's presidency, the FAP ushered in the Jet Age with the introduction of English Electric Canberra bombers and Hawker Hunter, Lockheed F-80 Shooting Star and North American F-86 Sabre fighters.

However, on 3 October 1968, a military junta led by pro-Soviet Peruvian Army General Juan Velasco Alvarado organized a swift and bloodless coup d'état against president Fernando Belaúnde Terry. Velasco aligned Peru more closely with the Soviet Bloc and relations with the United States deteriorated. The US declared an arms embargo in 1969, making it difficult to obtain spare parts for Peru's American weaponry. In the 1970s and 1980s, Peru turned to the Soviet Union for its military hardware. During this time, the FAP acquired several Soviet-made aircraft, including Sukhoi Su-22 fighters, Antonov An-26 and An-32 transport aircraft, as well as Mil Mi-8, Mi-17, Mi-25 and Mi-26 helicopters. Soviet advisors were also dispatched to Peru.

Velasco was overthrown by other military officers in 1975 and Belaúnde returned to power as a civilian president in 1980. Also in 1980, the Peruvian Air Force responded to a UFO incident over the Arequipa region.

The FAP purchased the French-made Mirage 5P and 5DP and the Mirage 2000 in 1984. Relations improved with the United States and the FAP obtained American aircraft like the Cessna A-37B Dragonfly attack aircraft, as well as Lockheed C-130 and L-100-20 Hercules transport aircraft.

==== Stagnation ====
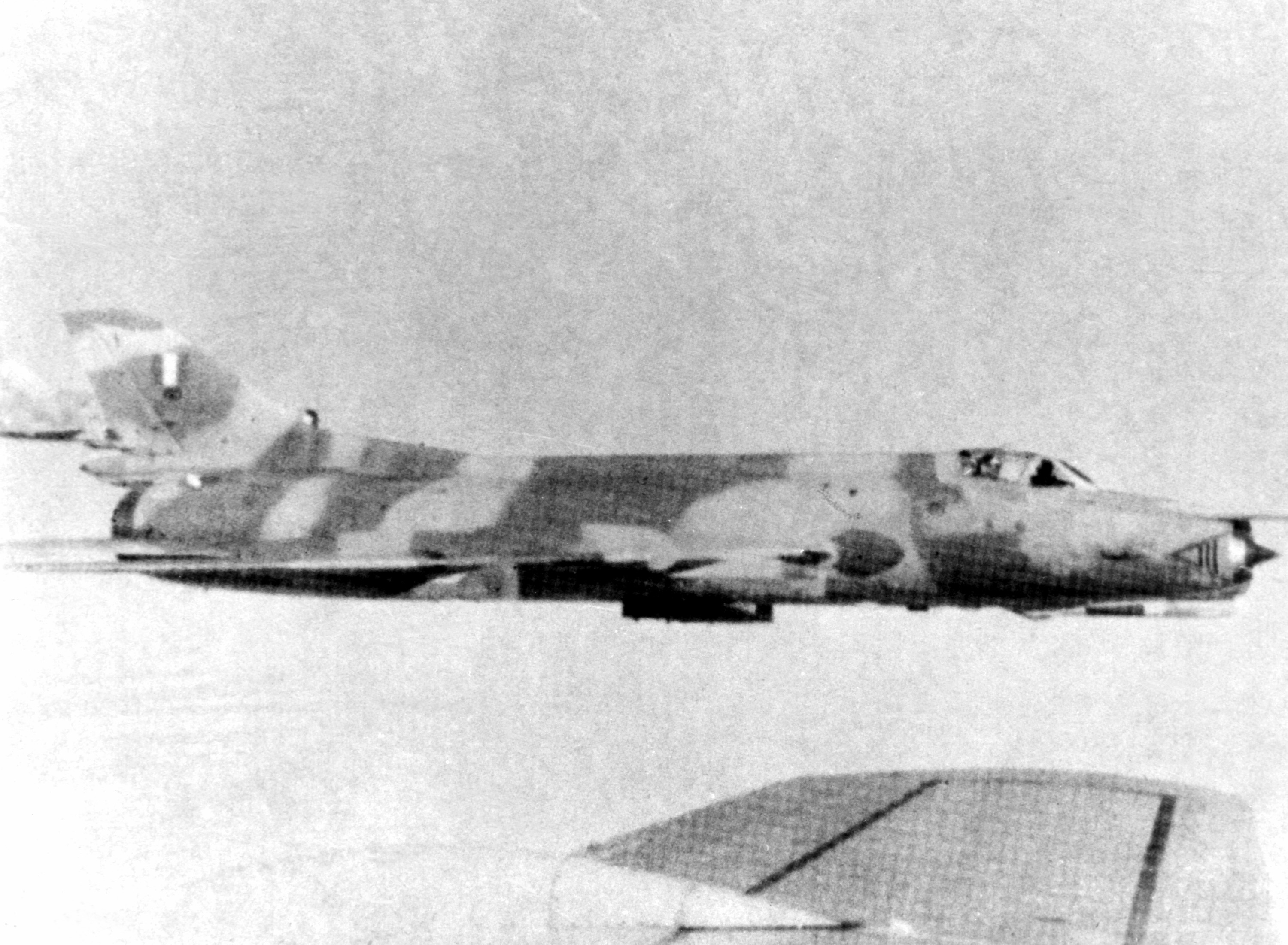
Peruvian Su-22 in 1983

The stagnation of the Peruvian economy during the late 1980s and early 1990s forced cost reductions and the downsizing of the fleet size. Budget cuts in training meant Peruvian pilots had a low number of annual flying hours (AFH) per pilot if compared to the 1970s. The number of annual flying hours is of course very important in estimating the individual skill and experience of the pilots of an air force: more annual flying hours suggest better trained pilots and general readiness. There are also a number of possible explanations for FAP's low AFH: concern over the aging of equipment, scarcity of spare parts – especially for the older aircraft – difficulties with worn airframes and the scarcity of fuel are all contributing factors. It is very likely however that some 'elite' pilots and regiments such as those based in Talara AFB and La Joya AFB received considerably more flying hours. Especially since those regiments until today are equipped with modern aircraft and tasked with homeland defence.

==== Cenepa War ====
The Peruvian Air Force participated in the 1995 Cenepa War against Ecuador's Air Force in the Amazon Basin. It provided aerial support to the Peruvian army, carrying out bombings with Mi-25 helicopters, Canberra bombers, A-37 and Su-22 aircraft. Due to a lack of reliable roads, troops were transported by Mi-17 helicopters, as well as L-100 Hercules, An-28 and An-32 aircraft. During the course of the war, at least two helicopters were shot down.

==== Fujimori government ====
In 1997 and 1998, the FAP's outlook started to change for the better. In order to achieve president Alberto Fujimori's militarily bold plans, FAP required a much-needed general overhaul and new purchases.

In 1997, the FAP acquired 21 MiG-29 fighters and 18 Su-25 attack fighters from Belarus. In 1998, an additional three MiG-29 fighters were bought from Russia, which, along with the 12 Mirage 2000 fighters purchased from France's Dassault Aviation in 1984, made a total of 54 fighters in Peru's inventory.

These purchases were expensive and a number of observers questioned their usefulness against more pressing security concerns at the time such as the Marxist guerillas, the Sendero Luminoso group (translated as Shining Path). On the other hand, the FAP still remembered the 1995 Cenepa War with Ecuador, and stationed its MiG-29s close to the border at Chiclayo AFB and Talara AFB.

=== 21st century ===
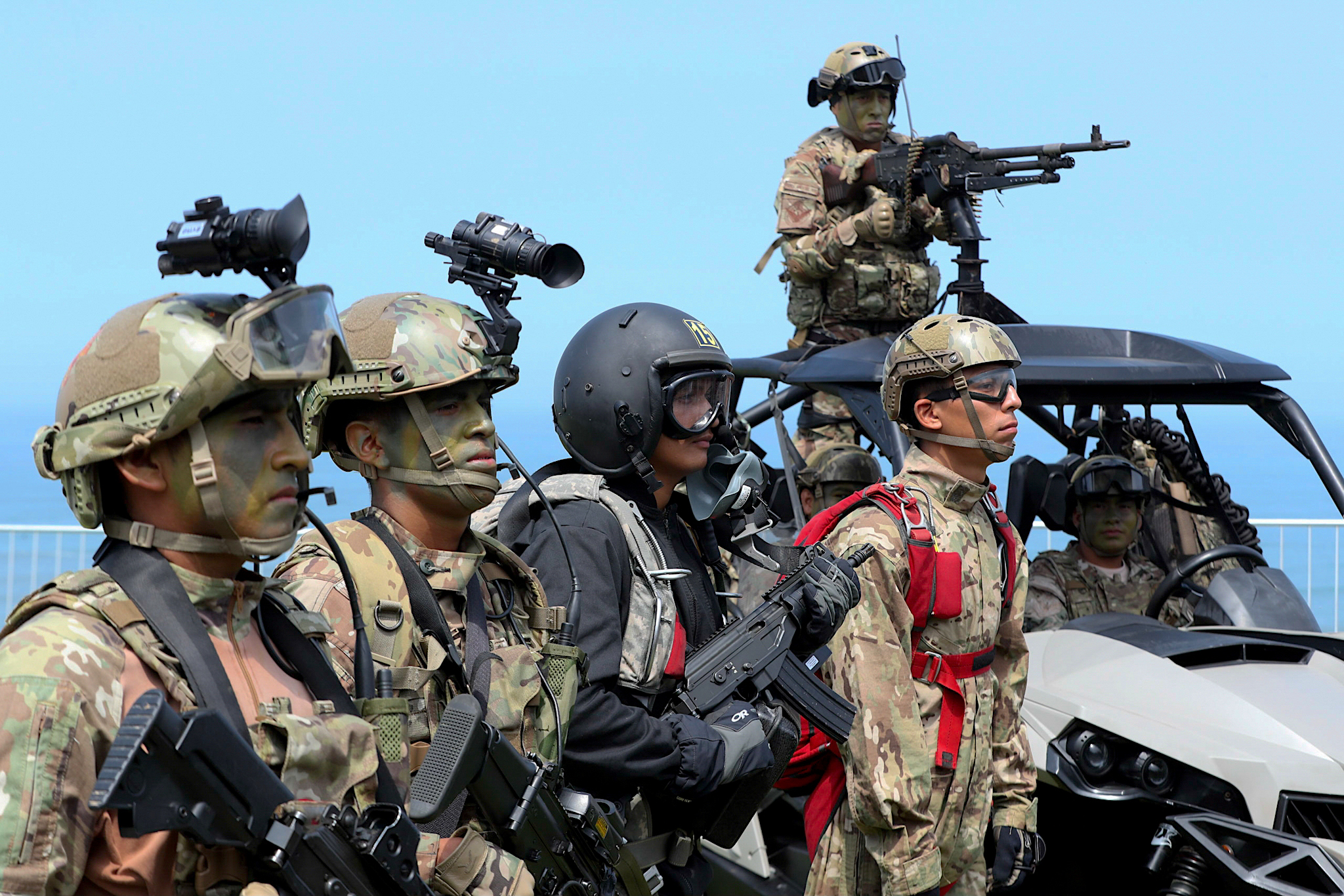
Various armed personnel of the Peruvian Air Force

Peru's Mirage 2000C/B and MiG-29S fighters form the backbone of its current multirole fighter fleet, alongside specialized Su-25 close air support jets. Its Mirage 2000Ps sit at La Joya AFB near the border with Bolivia and Chile; the 3 Andean countries have a minor 3-way maritime borders dispute, and residual tensions with historical foe Chile have been a long-running issue in Peru.

RAC MiG began the upgrade of FAP's MiG fleet to the MiG-29SMT external link standard in 2008. In 2009, Dassault began working with Peru on a comprehensive inspection of the Mirage fleet, coupled with some electronics modernization.

Since 2013, Peru is in talks with European suppliers as part of a long-term plan of replacing FAP's aging air force aircraft with second-hand Su-35s, Rafales or Eurofighters. Hitherto, FAP was exploring the possibility of buying as many as sixty Eurofighter Typhoon EF-2000 from Spain and sixty Sukhoi Su-35 from Russia. Cost was a major issue for Peruvian President Ollanta Humala, who was looking at competitively priced fighter jets that would fit the national budget. In 2014, Peru began to update the operations and mechanical equipment of its Cessna A-37 aircraft, replacing analog controls with new digital hardware. Peru has been evaluating multiple helicopters to modernize or replace previous utility helicopters and search and rescue operations with the Italian-made AW139. The purchase would consist of 12 helicopters for a total of $193 million.

Following the unveiling of the KAI KF-21 Boramae in April 2021, The National Interest reported that Peru may be a potential customer for the 4.5 generation fighter.

In June 2025, the Swedish Rikstag agreed to negotiate with the Peruvian Air Force for the sale of twelve Gripens of the E/F variants. These may replace the Mirage 2000's and MiG-29's.

In July 2025, it was confirmed that Peru will buy 24 Saab Gripens.. Debt of S/ 7.58 billion: Towards the end of 2025 (and consolidated in January 2026), the Government officially approved (via decree and Debt Law) an external debt operation of approximately 2 billion dollars (S/ 7.58 billion) specifically allocated for the investment project for the "recovery of the operational capacity of air defense, this step was the indispensable legal requirement prior to the signing of any final contract with Saab, Dassault or Lockheed Martin.

While there were strong reports in June/July 2025 (such as the one from La República) pointing to the Gripen E/F as the favorite because it fit the initial budget of 3.5 billion dollars, specialized sources indicated that the competition remained technically open until the end of the year. Dassault Rafale F4: It remained the preferred technical competitor for sectors of the FAP due to its interoperability with the current Mirage 2000 fleet, although its operating cost is higher. F-16 Block 70: Lockheed Martin continued to offer modernization and logistics packages, keeping the US proposal current in the Department of Defense evaluations through the end of fiscal year 2025.

== Organization ==
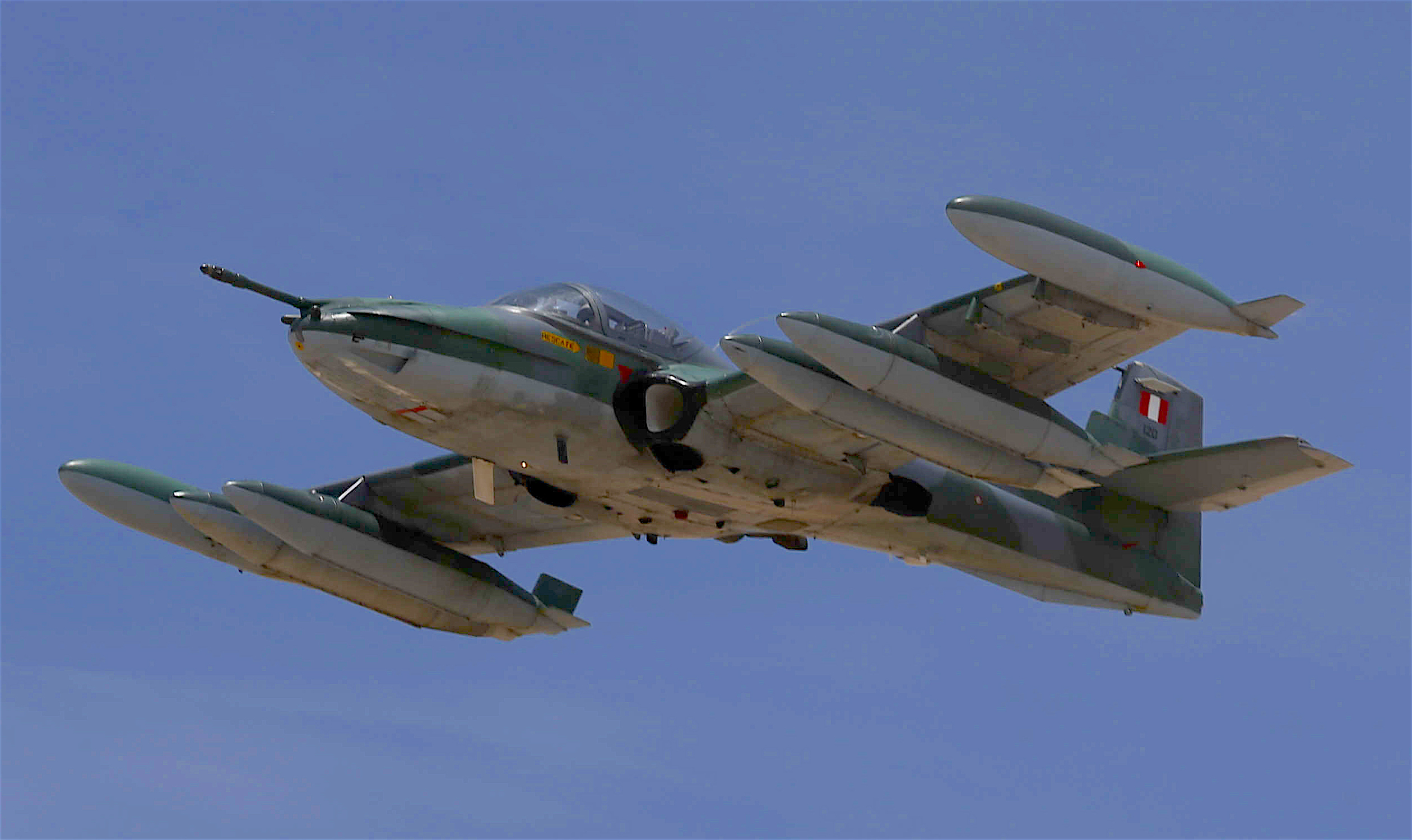
Peruvian Cessna A-37 Dragonfly in 2015

=== Air Wing Nº 1 ===
- Air Group Nº 6 – headquarters: Chiclayo
  - Air Squadron 612 ("Fighting Roosters" combat squadron operating MiG-29S | MiG-29SE | MiG-29SMP | MiG-29UBP)
- Air Group Nº 7 – headquarters: Piura
  - Air Squadron 711 ("Scorpions" combat squadron operating Cessna A-37 Dragonfly)
- Air Group Nº 11 – headquarters: Talara
  - Air Squadron 112 ("Tigers" combat squadron operating Su-25UB)

=== Air Wing Nº 2 ===
- Air Group Nº 3 – headquarters: Callao
  - 315 Helicopter Squadron (operating MBB Bo 105)
  - Helicopter Squadron 332 (operating Bell 212, Agusta-Bell AB-412SP)
  - Helicopter Squadron 341 (operating Mi-8 MTV-1, Mi-17 H/1B | Mi-171Sh)
- Air Group Nº 8 – headquarters: Callao
  - Transport Squadron 841 (operating Boeing B-737-200, Boeing 737-500)
  - Transport Squadron 842 (operating L-100-20 Hercules)
  - Transport Squadron 843 (operating An-32B)
  - Transport Squadron 844 (operating C-27J Spartan)
- Directorate of Air Surveillance and Recognition (DIVRA) & National Aerial Photography Service (SAN) – Headquarters: Lima
  - Air Squadron 330 (operating UAS FAP Mk1, Mk2, Mk3, Mk4, Drone FAP Mk5 and Mk6)
  - Air Squadron 331 (operating Learjet 35 equipped with metric aerial cameras Leica RC-30 and GPS Trimble R7 GNSS)
  - Air Squadron 334 (operating Fairchild C-26 Metroliner, Twin Commander 690B)
- EFOPI – Pilot Training School (former Air Group Nº 51) – Headquarters: Pisco
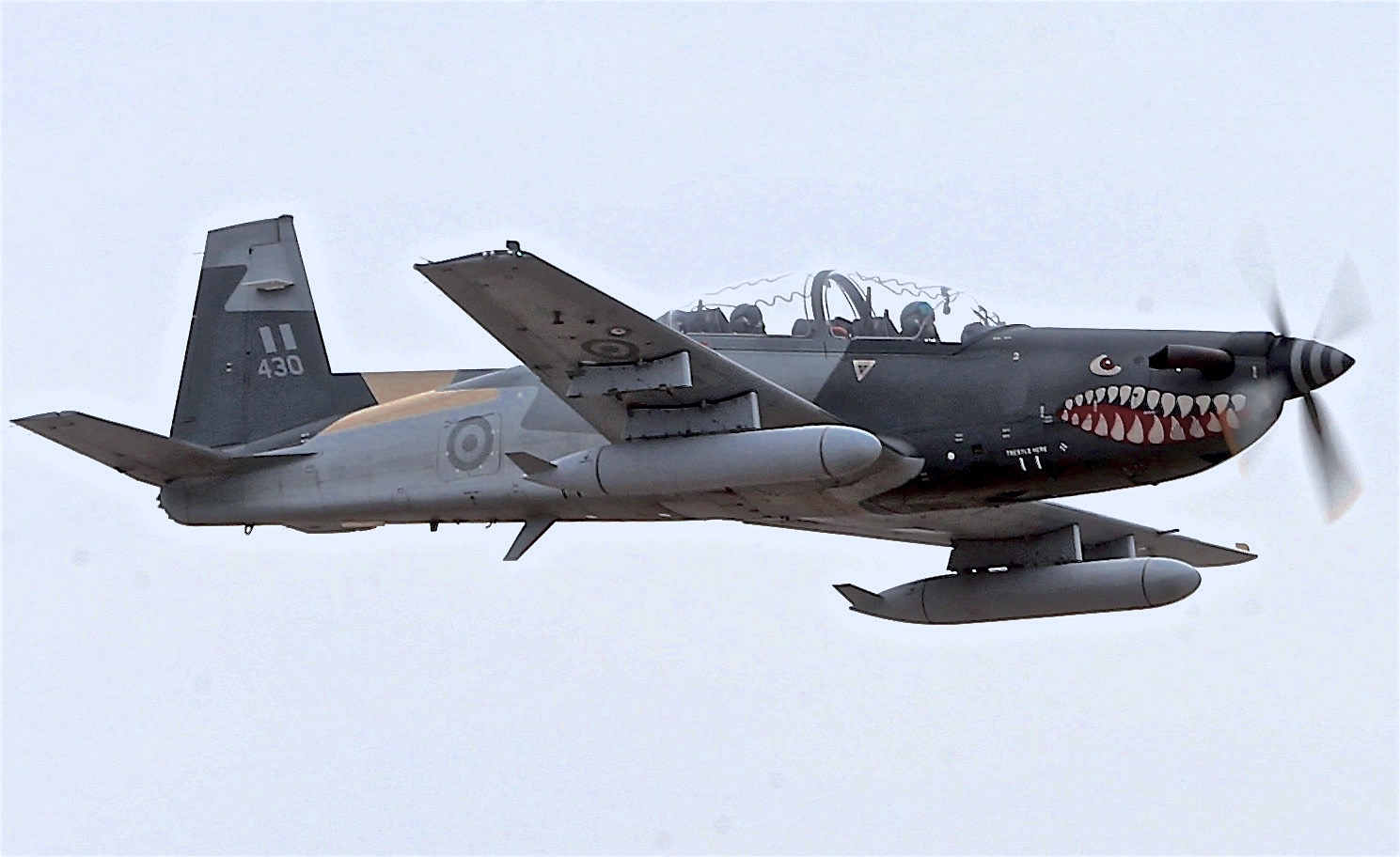
  Peruvian KAI KT-1P Woongbi
  - Air Squadron 510 (basic training operating Schweizer S-300C)
  - Air Squadron 511 (basic training operating Zlin Z-242)
  - Air Squadron 512 (basic training operating KAI KT-1P)
  - Air Squadron 513 (advanced training operating KAI KT-1P)

=== Air Wing Nº 3 ===
- Grupo Aéreo Nº 2 – headquarters: Vítor (Arequipa)
  - Air Squadron 211 (Attack Helicopter Squadron "Dragons of the Air" operating Mi-25 D/DU and Mi-35 P)
- Grupo Aéreo Nº 4 – headquarters: La Joya (Arequipa)
  - Air Squadron 412 ("Hawks" combat squadron operating Mirage 2000 P/DP)
- Command School FAP – headquarters: La Joya (Arequipa)
- Puerto Maldonado Air Base
- Tacna Air Detachment

=== Air Wing Nº 5 ===
- Air Group Nº 42 – headquarters: Iquitos
  - Air Squadron 421 (operating DHC-6 and Y-12)
  - Air Squadron 422 (operating PC-6)
- Santa Clara Air Base – headquarters: Iquitos

== Personnel ==
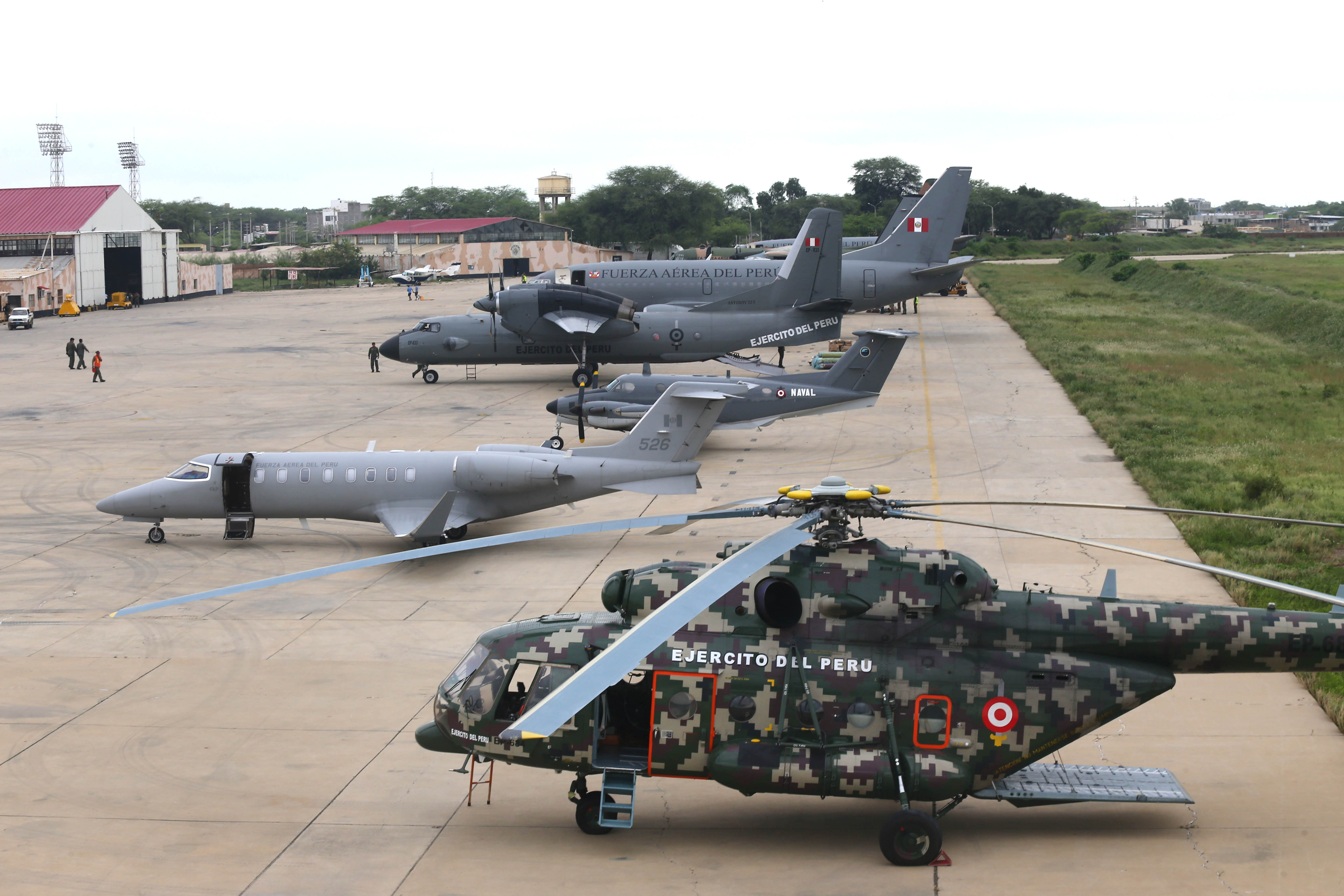
Peruvian Air Force fleet in Piura in 2017

Personnel (as of 2001)
Commissioned Officers	1,909
Non-commissioned officers	7,559
Cadets	325
NCO in training	296
Enlisted	7,880
Civilians	8,708
Total	17,969 (excl. civilians)

=== Ranks ===
Commissioned officers

Rank group	General / flag officers			Senior officers			Junior officers
Peruvian Air Force
Peruvian Air Force	General del aire	Teniente general	Mayor general	Coronel	Comandante	Mayor	Capitán	Teniente	Alférez

NCOs and enlisted

Rank group	Senior NCOs					Junior NCOs	Enlisted
Peruvian Air Force
Peruvian Air Force	Suboficial primero	Suboficial segundo	Suboficial tercero	Sargento primero	Sargento segundo	Cabo	Avionero

== Equipment ==
=== Aircraft ===
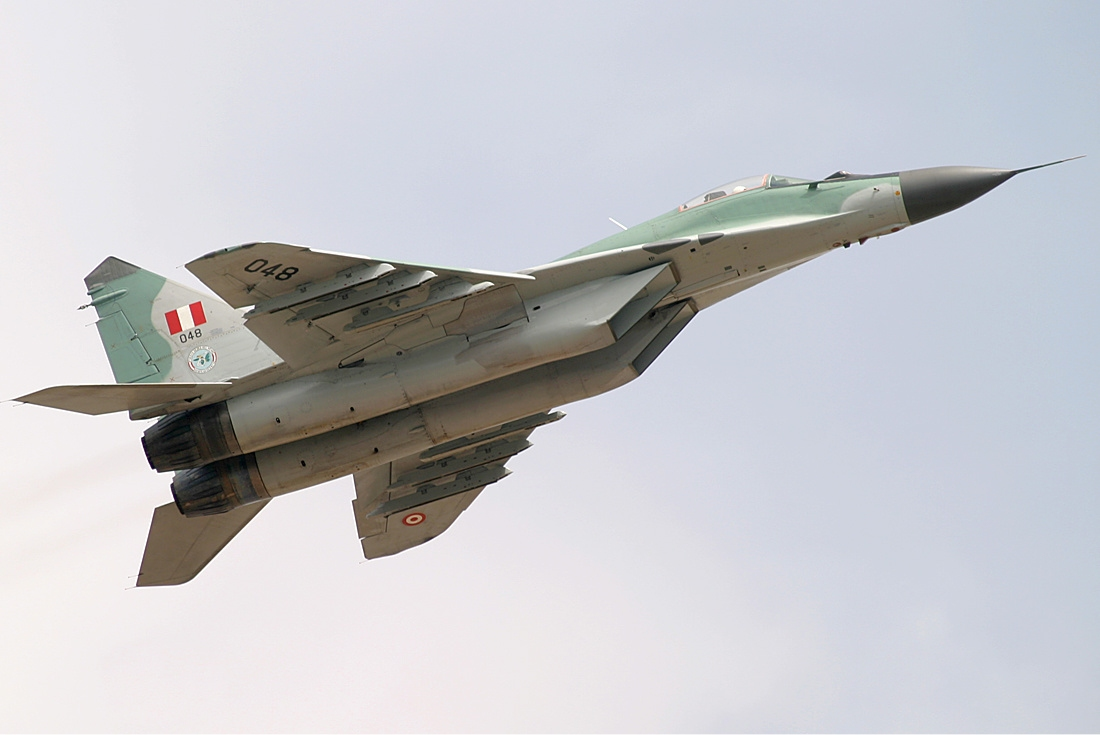
An Air Force MiG-29 at Halcon-Condor 2010 festival

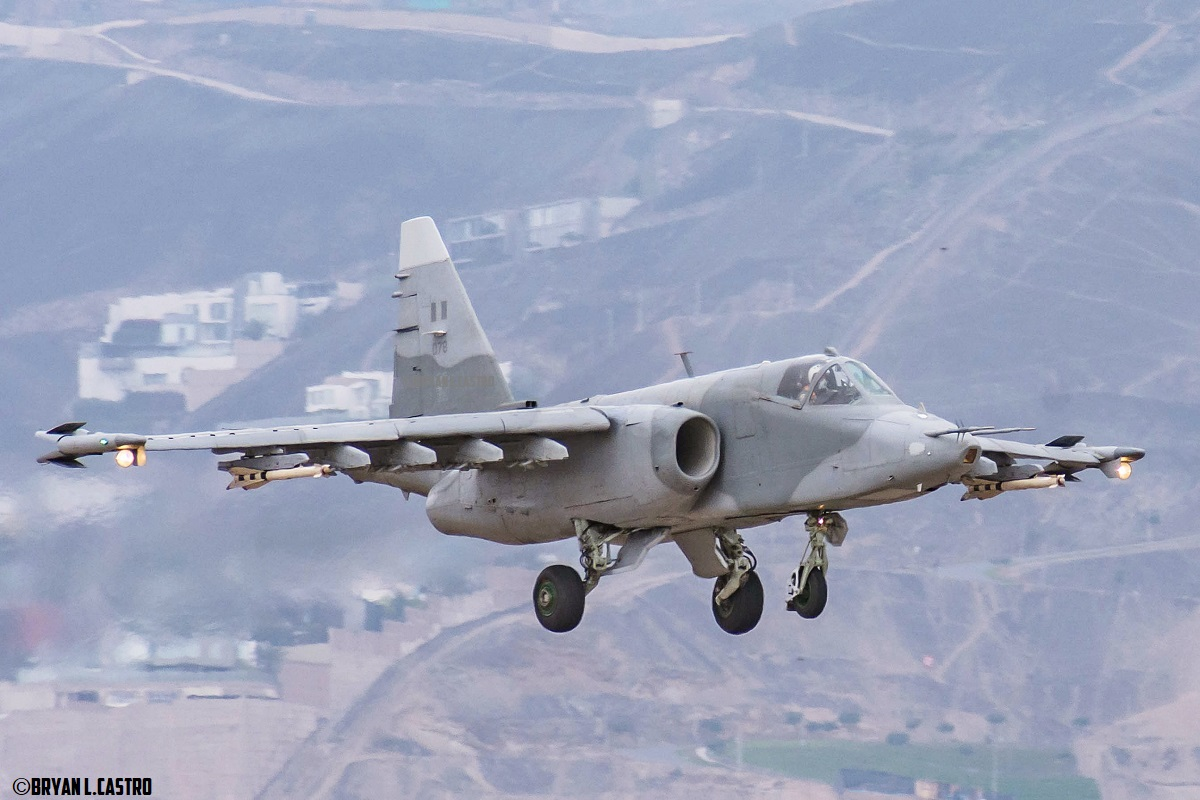
A Sukhoi Su-25 in 2024

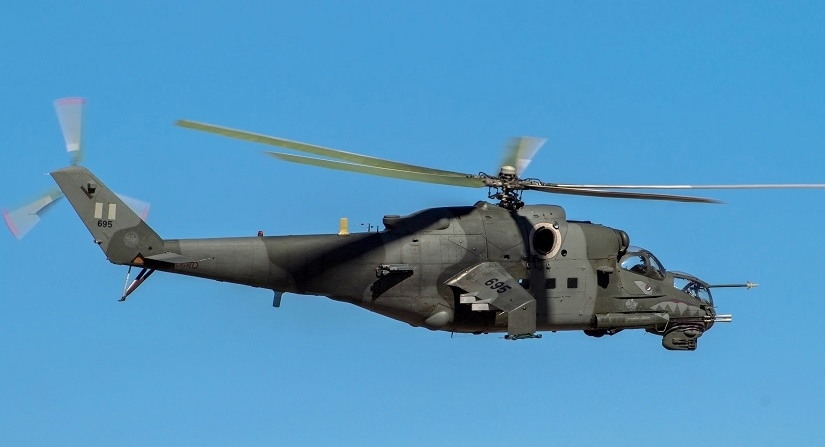
A Mi-35 in flight

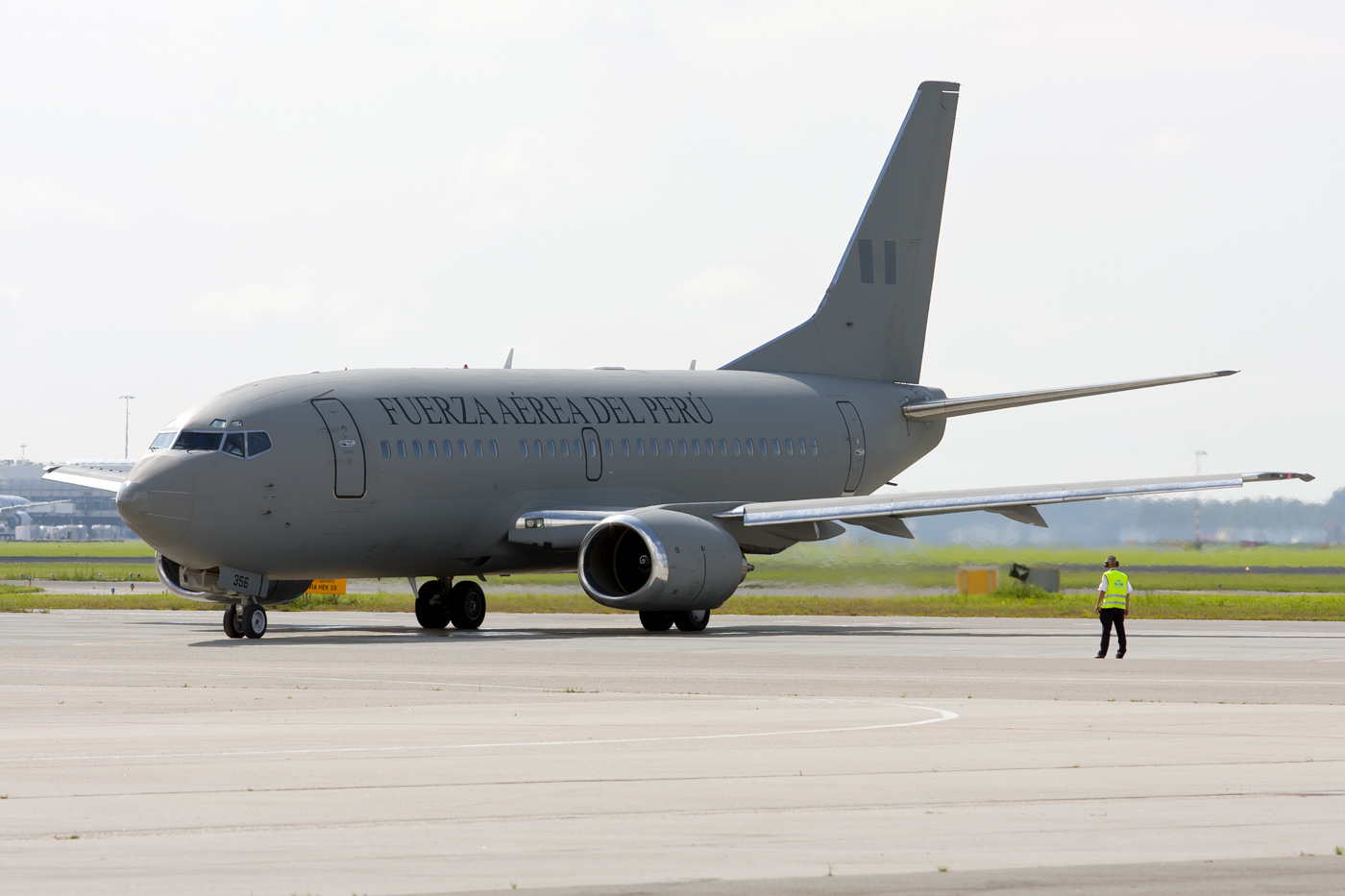
A Boeing 737 of the Peruvian Air Force in 2014

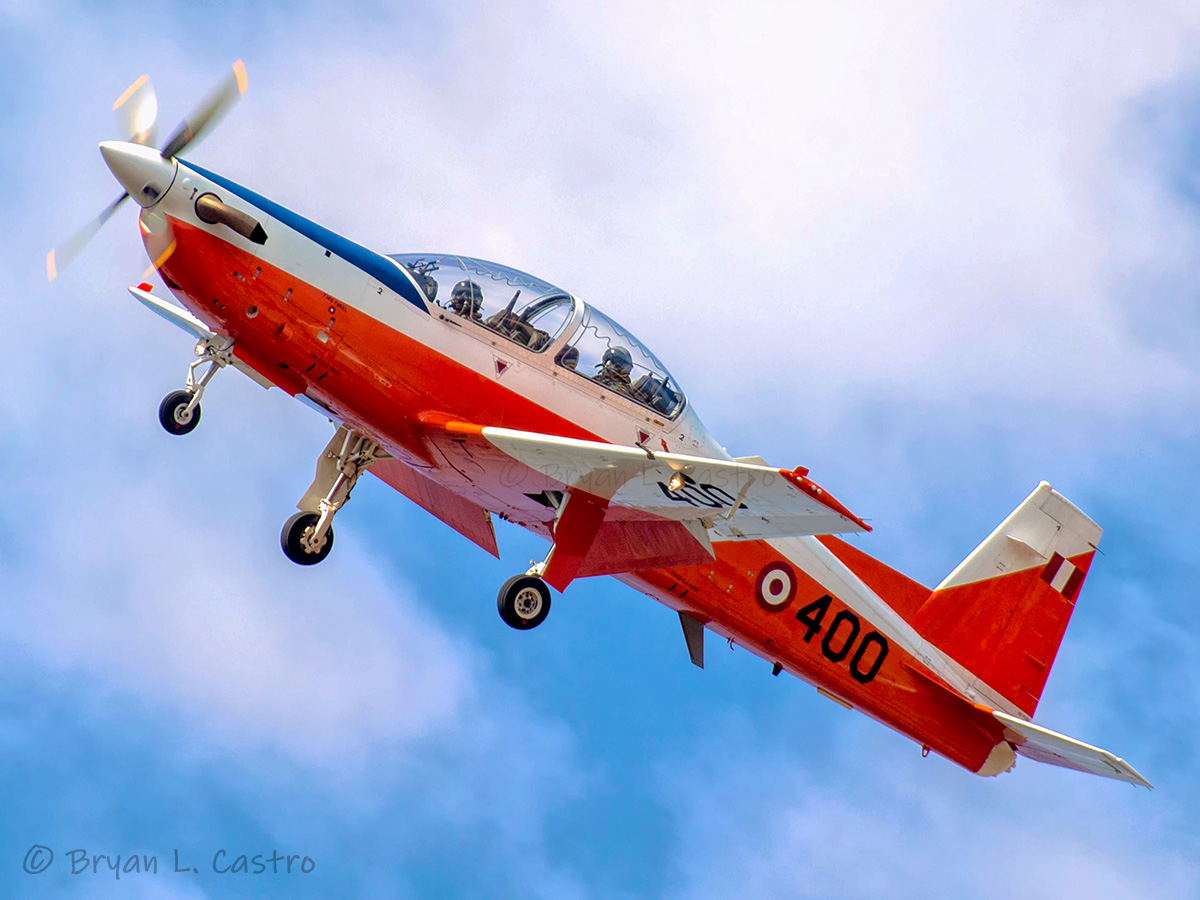
A KT-1 Woongbi in flight

Aircraft	Origin	Type	Variant	In service	Notes
Combat aircraft
Lockheed Martin F-16V Viper	United States	Multirole fighter	F-16C Block 70	0	12 aircraft ordered (10 F-16C, 2 F-16D) out of 24 planned
Lockheed Martin F-16V Viper	United States	Multirole fighter	F-16D Block 70	0	12 aircraft ordered (10 F-16C, 2 F-16D) out of 24 planned
Dassault Mirage 2000	France	multirole	2000P	9	One lost in April 2024 in a training accident.
Dassault Mirage 2000	France	multirole	2000DP	2	Used for conversion training
MiG-29	Russia	multirole	SMP/UBP	6	Two used for conversion training
Sukhoi Su-25	Russia	attack	Su-25K	2	
Cessna A-37	United States	attack	A-37B	20	
Tanker
KC-130 Hercules	United States	aerial refueling / transport	KC-130H	2	
KC-135 Stratotanker	United States	aerial refueling / transport	KC-135R	1	Part of Package F-16 deal, halted by president Balcazar as of April 21 2026
Reconnaissance
C-26 Metroliner	United States	surveillance / COMINT	C-26B	3	donated by the U.S. for anti-drug operations
Learjet 35	United States	photomapping	U-36	2	
Transport
Boeing 737	United States	VIP	500	1	
Learjet 45	United States	VIP		1	
Boeing 737 NG	United States	utility transport	800	1	
Piper PA-34	United States	utility		1	
Beechcraft Super King Air	United States	utility transport		1	
Aero Commander 690B	United States	utility transport		1	
C-27J Spartan	Italy	transport		6	
Antonov An-32	Ukraine	transport		3	
Beechcraft Baron	United States	utility		1	
DHC-6 Twin Otter	Canada	utility transport		15	STOL capable aircraft
Lockheed L-100	United States	transport		3	
Pilatus PC-6	Switzerland	utility / transport		1	STOL capable aircraft
Helicopters
Bell 412	United States	utility		2	
Bell 212	United states	utility		1	
Mil Mi-8	Russia	utility transport		1	
Mil Mi-17	Russia	utility	Mi-17/171	10	8 on order
Mil Mi-25	Russia	attack	Mi-35	18	
MBB Bo 105	Germany	utility		2	
Kaman Super Seasprite	United States	Airborne early warning	SH-2G	5	
Trainer aircraft
Zlín Z 42	Czech Republic	trainer	Z 242	3	
CH2000	United States	trainer		10	8 on order
Piper PA-44	United States	multi-engine trainer		1	
Sikorsky S-300	United States	rotorcraft trainer		4	
Enstrom 280	United States	rotorcraft trainer		4	4 on order
KT-1 Woongbi	Republic of Korea	primary trainer	KT-1P	19	1 lost in 2025
UAV
UAV FAP	Peru	Reconnaissance		6	

=== Infantry weapons ===
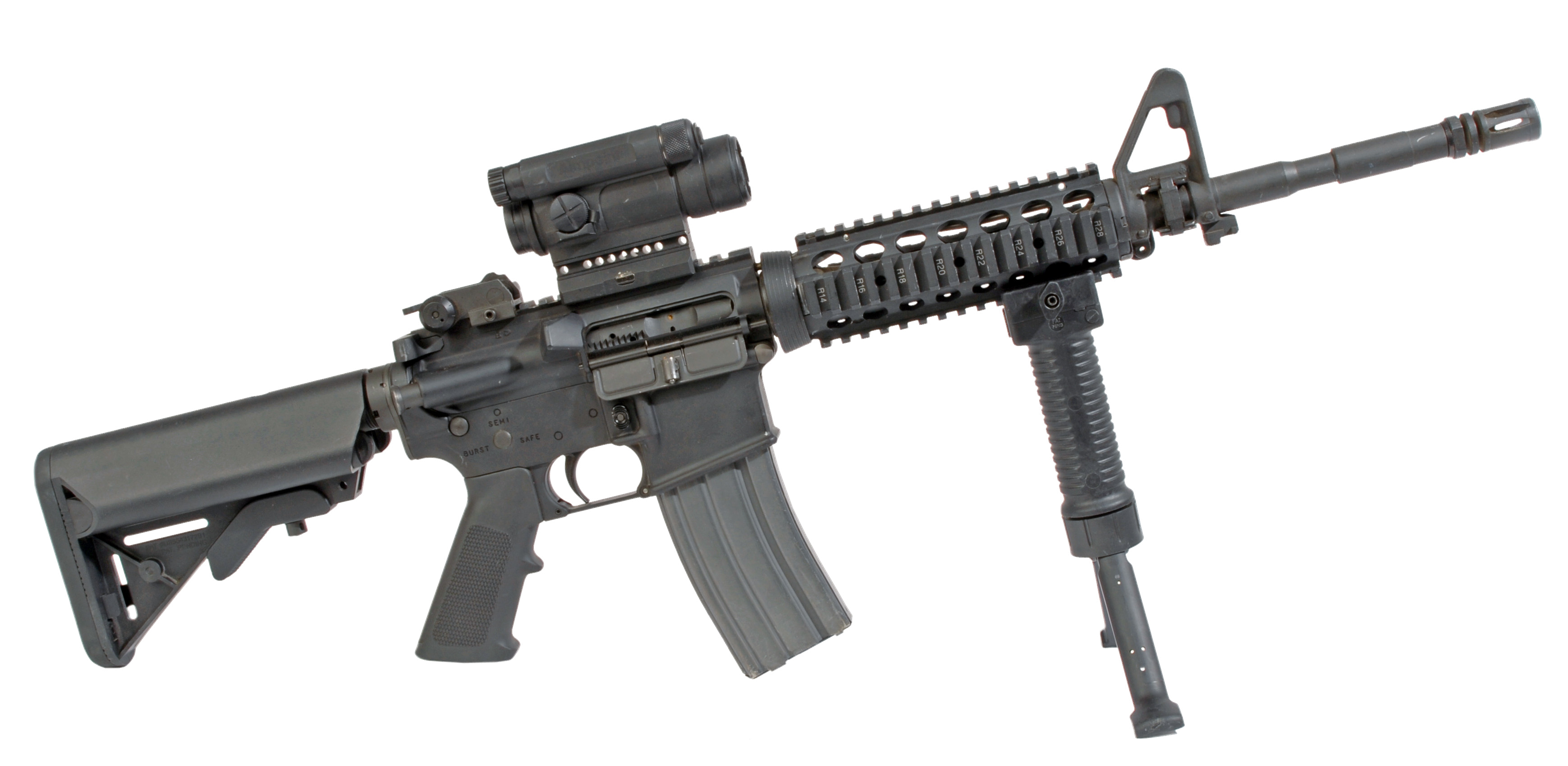
The M4 carbine

Name	Origin	Type	Variant	Notes
Small arms
Vektor SP1	South Africa	semi-auto pistol		
AKM	Soviet Union	assault rifle		
M4 carbine	United States	assault rifle	M4A1	
IMI Galil	Israel	assault rifle		
Milkor BXP	South Africa	submachine gun		
Uzi	Israel	submachine gun		
Air defense
9K38 Igla	Russia	MANPADS		
Javelin	United Kingdom	MANPADS		
Armor
BTR-60	Soviet Union	Armoured personnel carrier		amphibious capable vehicle
BRDM-2	Soviet Union	Armoured personnel carrier	Malyutka	amphibious capable vehicle

== See also ==
- Cenepa War
- Ecuadorian–Peruvian War
- Falso Paquisha War
- José Quiñones Gonzales

== Sources ==
- Cobas, Efraín, Las Fuerzas Armadas Peruanas en el Siglo XXI. CESLA, 2003.
- Marchessini, Alejo, "La Fuerza Aérea del Perú"; Defensa 295: 30–42 (November 2002).
- Marchessini, Alejo, "La aviación de combate de origen ruso de la FAP"; Defensa 342: 34–36 (October 2006).
- Marchessini, Alejo, "El Servicio de Material de Guerra de la FAP"; Defensa 355: 48–50 (November 2007).
