= Internal conflict in Peru =

Internal armed conflict in Peru in the late 20th century against Maoist groups

- Part of the Cold War (1980–1991), spillover of the Colombian conflict (1970s–present) and the war on drugs (1980–present)
- Areas of Shining Path activity in Peru
| Date | Main phase 17 May 1980 – 14 July 1999 (Note: The MRTA's first leader, Víctor Polay Campos, was captured in 1992. His successor, Néstor Cerpa Cartolini, was killed in the military operation that ended the Japanese embassy hostage crisis in 1997, ending the group's existence. The Shining Path's leader, Abimael Guzmán Reynoso, was captured in 1992. His successor, Óscar Ramírez, was captured in 1999, after which Shining Path dissolved and retreated to VRAEM Valley, beginning a period of relative peace from late 1999 to mid-2001.) (19 years, 58 days); Low-level activity 9 August 2001 – present (25 years, 83 days) |
| Location | Peru |
| Result | First phase: Government victory; Fall and dissolution of the Túpac Amaru Revolutionary Movement and the Shining Path; Exile of communist militants abroad; Second phase: Ongoing: Arrest and trial of Alberto Fujimori; Establishment of Shining Path factions in 2001 (CBMR) and 2004 (CRH); Disestablishment of the CRH in 2012; Establishment of the MPCP in 2018; Death of Abimael Guzmán in prison; Ongoing insurgency in the VRAEM; Peruvian security crisis since 2021 |

Belligerents
| Government of Peru; Rondas campesinas (Note: These autonomous units have been organised by the Armed Forces since 1982, taking the name of "Self-Defence Committees" (CAD) since 1991. Since its establishment in 2006, most rondas have been organized under the Sole National Central of Peasant Rounds of Peru (CUNARC–P).); ASPRET (since 2023) | Shining Path (PCP–SL) (1980–2000); CBMR (since 2001); CRH (2004–2012); FARC dissidents (since 2016); Comandos de la Frontera; MPCP (Note: Until 2018, the Militarized Communist Party of Peru (MPCP) was unofficially referred to as the "Shining Path remnants" (Remanentes de Sendero Luminoso) or as the "Shining Path in the VRAEM" (Sendero Luminoso en el VRAEM). The Peruvian government continues to refer to the MPCP as the direct successor to the Shining Path.): Ethnocacerists; ASPRET (2011–2023); FAR-EPT (Note: The Revolutionary Armed Forces – Tupacamarist People's Army (Fuerzas Armadas Revolucionarias - Ejército Popular Tupacamarista) was established in 2015 by Julio César Vásquez Vásquez, a former member of the MRTA.); MRTA (1982–1997) |

Commanders and leaders
| Main phase: Fernando Belaúnde; Alan García; Alberto Fujimori; Vladimiro Montesinos; Second phase: Valentín Paniagua; Alejandro Toledo; Alan García; Ollanta Humala; Pedro Pablo Kuczynski; Martín Vizcarra; Manuel Merino; Francisco Sagasti; Pedro Castillo; Dina Boluarte; José Jerí; José María Balcázar; Keiko Fujimori | Main phase: Abimael Guzmán (surrendered) #; Augusta La Torre X; Elena Yparraguirre (surrendered); Osmán Morote (surrendered); Martha Huatay (surrendered); Óscar Ramírez (surrendered); Víctor Polay (surrendered); Peter Cárdenas (surrendered); Néstor Cerpa †; Miguel Rincón #; Américo Gilvonio #; Alberto Gálvez (surrendered); Second phase: Víctor Quispe; Jorge Quispe †; Martín Quispe †; Alejando Borda †; Florabel Vargas; Comrade Basilio †; Comrade Antonio †; Florindo Flores (surrendered); Other leaders: Antauro Humala (surrendered); Marco Vizcarra Ruiz |

Units involved
| Peruvian Armed Forces; Joint Command; CIOEC (Note: The Intelligence and Joint Special Operations Command (Spanish: Comando de Inteligencia y Operaciones Especiales Conjuntas, CIOEC) carries out anti-insurgency operations in the VRAEM region.); FEC (Note: The Special Joint Force (Spanish: Fuerza Especial Conjunta) is an elite group that joins members of the Armed Forces and the Police's Special Operations Directorate (Spanish: Dirección de Operaciones Especiales, DINOES).); Peruvian Army; CRF; Grupo Colina; Peruvian Navy; IMAP; Peruvian Air Force; Peruvian Police (Note: Until their incorporation into a single police body in 1991, the police corps were divided into the Civil Guard, the Republican Guard and the Investigative Police.); DINOES; DIRCOTE; GEIN; Sinchis | People's Guerrilla Army (EGP); Revolutionary Armed Forces of Peru (FARP); Tupacamarist People's Army (EPT) |

Strength
| 1980–2000: 35,000+ troops 250,000 ronderos (1993); 2000–now: 10,000 troops 2,000 ronderos | 1980–2000: 180,000 senderistas rebels 300–2,000 emerretistas rebels 2000–now: 20,000 senderistas 3,000 emerretistas 30,000 criminals |

Casualties and losses
| 30,000 casualties | 109,000 casualties |
- Total civilian casualties: 50,000–70,000 killed or missing 600,000 displaced

The internal conflict in Peru is an armed conflict between the Government of Peru and the Maoist guerrilla group Shining Path. The conflict's main phase began on 17 May 1980 and ended in December 2000. From 1982 to 1997 the Túpac Amaru Revolutionary Movement (MRTA) waged its own insurgency as a Marxist–Leninist rival to the Shining Path.

As fighting intensified in the 1980s, Peru had one of the worst human rights records in the Western Hemisphere and experienced thousands of forced disappearances while both the Peruvian Armed Forces and Shining Path acted with impunity, sometimes massacring entire villages. Fifty thousand to 70,000 people were killed, making it the bloodiest war in the country's independent history. This includes many civilians who were targeted by all factions. The Indigenous peoples were disproportionately attacked, with 75% of those killed speaking Quechua as their native language. The conflict is characterized by multiple serious violations of human rights.

Since 2000, the number of deaths has dropped significantly, with the conflict becoming somewhat dormant.

== Background ==
The economy and demographic makeup of Peru by the 20th century left a space for the Maoist politics of the Shining Path to enter. Over 40% of the population were part of the rural peasantry, overwhelmingly from an indigenous background that lived in chronic poverty which established a support base for the Shining Path. In addition, the movement of the initially left-wing American Popular Revolutionary Alliance toward the right opened a vacuum for Marxist revolutionary thought.

The first guerrilla outbreaks arose in Peru in the early 1960s, during the Moderate Civil Reform, when the Revolutionary Left Movement (MIR), a guerrilla group founded and led by Luis de la Puente Uceda, began its first attacks against the Peruvian State in 1962. However, despite training in Fidel Castro's Cuba, the MIR was often in an unstable state, as they were based in the Amazon. As a result, its members were easily killed by the police and the armed forces. During these counterattacks, their leader and founder was killed and the group would eventually collapse completely by 1965. Another guerrilla group that also emerged during this time was the National Liberation Army (ELN), operating from 1962 until 1965, led by Juan Pablo Chang Navarro and trained in Cuba. It was made up of some former members of the MIR and other recruited people. However, this organization suffered the same fate as the MIR, with many of members being infected with leishmaniasis, leading to them being killed by the Peruvian army. After its dismantling, its main leaders fled to Bolivia where they would fight alongside Che Guevara in the Ñancahuazú Guerrilla, until they ended up being assassinated while trying to establish a guerrilla foco in the Andes.

Prior to the conflict, Peru had undergone a series of coups, with frequent switches between political parties and ideologies. On 2 October 1968, General Juan Velasco Alvarado staged a coup d'état and became Peru's 56th president under the administration of the Revolutionary Government of the Armed Forces, left-leaning military dictatorship. The political reforms of the new government led to a rise in influence of Marxist movements in Peru. The RMG favoured Marxist-orientated trade unions, so much that by 1977, pro-Communist unions were three times larger than APRA's previously dominant unions. Miner unions also came under Maoist influence in this period. While in education, about one-third of Peru's 360,000 teachers had become affiliated with Maoist unions. Workers' strikes became more common place in Peru in this period as many unions became increasingly militant. Following a period of widespread poverty and unemployment, Velasco himself was overthrown in a bloodless military coup on 29 August 1975. He was ousted by Francisco Morales Bermúdez as the new President of Peru.

Morales announced that his rule would provide a "Second Phase" to the previous administration, which would bring about political and economic reforms. However, he was unsuccessful in delivering these promises, and in 1978, a Constitutional Assembly was created to replace Peru's 1933 Constitution. Morales then proclaimed that national elections would be held by 1980. Elections were held for the Constituent Assembly on 18 June 1978, whilst martial law was imposed on 6 January 1979. The Assembly approved the new constitution in July 1979.

Many who were affiliated with Peru's Communist Party had opposed the creation of the new constitution and split of to form the organization known as the Communist Party of Peru – Shining Path. This led to the emergence of internal conflict, with the first attacks taking place a day before the elections. Despite this, national elections continued and Fernando Belaúnde was elected as the 58th President of Peru on 18 May 1980. Belaúnde had already served as the country's 55th president prior to Velasco's coup in 1968. Between February 1966 and July 1980 approximately 500 people died due to political violence.

=== Shining Path ===
During the governments of Velasco and Morales, the Shining Path had been organized as a Maoist political group formed in 1970 by Abimael Guzmán, a communist and professor of philosophy at the San Cristóbal of Huamanga University. Guzmán had been inspired by the Chinese Cultural Revolution which he had witnessed first-hand during a trip there. Shining Path members engaged in street fights with members of other political groups and painted graffiti encouraging an "armed struggle" against the Peruvian state.

In June 1979, demonstrations for free education were severely repressed by the army, with 18 people were killed according to official figures, and non-governmental estimating several dozen more deaths. This event led to a radicalization of political protests in the countryside and the outbreak of the Communist Party of Peru – Shining Path's actions.

== First phase (1980–2000) ==
=== Belaúnde administration (1980–1985) ===
When Peru's military government allowed elections for the first time in 1980, the Communist Party of Peru – Shining Path was one of the few leftist political groups that declined to take part. They opted instead to launch guerrilla warfare actions against the state in the province of Ayacucho. On 17 May 1980—the eve of the presidential elections—members of the Shining Path burned ballot boxes in the town of Chuschi, Ayacucho. The perpetrators were quickly caught and additional ballots were brought in to replace the burned ballots; the elections proceeded without any further incidents. The incident received very little attention in the Peruvian press. A few days later, on 13 June, a group of young people belonging to the "generated organization" Movement of Labourers y Workers Clasistas (MOTC) carried out an attack on the Municipality of San Martín de Porres in Lima with Molotov cocktails commemorating the Chuschi incident.

The Shining Path opted to fight in the manner advocated by Mao Zedong. They would open up "guerrilla zones" in which their guerrillas could operate and drive government forces out of these zones to create "liberated zones". These zones would then be used to support new guerrilla zones until the entire country was essentially a unified "liberated zone". There is some disagreement among scholars about the extent of Maoist influence on the Communist Party of Peru – Shining Path, but the majority of scholars consider the Shining Path to be a violent Maoist organization. One of the factors contributing to support for this view among scholars is that the Shining Path's economic and political base were located primarily in rural areas and they sought to build up their influence in these areas.

On 3 December 1982, the Communist Party of Peru – Shining Path officially formed an armed wing known as the "People's Guerrilla Army". The Peruvian guerrillas were peculiar in that they had a high proportion of women; 50 percent of the combatants and 40 percent of the commanders were women.

==== Túpac Amaru Revolutionary Movement ====
In 1982, the Túpac Amaru Revolutionary Movement (MRTA) also launched its own guerrilla war against the Peruvian state. The group had been formed by remnants of the Movement of the Revolutionary Left and identified with Castroite guerrilla movements in other parts of Latin America. The MRTA used techniques that were more traditional to Latin American leftist organizations, like wearing uniforms, claiming to fight for true democracy, and accusations of human rights abuses by the state; in contrast, the Shining Path did not wear uniforms, nor care for electoral processes.

During the conflict, the MRTA and the Shining Path engaged in combat with each other. The MRTA only played a small part in the overall conflict, being declared by the Truth and Reconciliation Commission to have been responsible for 1.5 percent of casualties accumulated throughout the conflict. At its height, the MRTA was believed to have consisted of only a few hundred members.

==== Belaúnde's response and massacres ====
President Fernando Belaúnde began the authoritarian trend of consolidating power within the executive to combat guerrilla groups, using his support in Congress to enact legislation and limit civil liberties. His crackdown mirrored strategies employed by other anti-communist regimes in the region, such as Brazil's dictatorship, which collaborated with the U.S. to suppress leftist movements under the guise of Cold War anticommunism. Gradually, the Shining Path committed more and more violent attacks on the National Police of Peru until bombings near Lima increased the gravity of the conflict. In December 1982, President Belaúnde declared a state of emergency and ordered that the Peruvian Armed Forces fight Shining Path, granting them extraordinary power. Military leadership adopted practices used by Argentina during the Dirty War, committing many human rights violations in the area where it had political control, with entire villages being massacred by the Peruvian armed forces while hundreds of civilians were forcibly disappeared by troops. The Peruvian military's tactics, including the use of U.S.-trained units like the Sinchis, paralleled broader Cold War patterns where Washington supported authoritarian regimes in Latin America to combat perceived Marxist threats, often at the cost of human rights. A special U.S.-trained "counter terrorist" police battalion is known as the "Sinchis" became notorious in the 1980s for their violations of human rights.

The Communist Party of Peru – Shining Path's reaction to the Peruvian government's use of the military in the conflict was to increase violent warfare in the countryside. Shining Path attacked police officers, soldiers, and civilians that it considered to be "class enemies", often using gruesome methods of killing their victims. These killings, along with Shining Path's disrespect for the culture of indigenous peasants, turned many civilians in the Andes away from the group.

Faced with a hostile population, Shining Path's guerrilla campaigns began to falter. In some areas, fearful, well-off peasants formed anti-Shining Path patrols called rondas campesinas or simply rondas. They were generally poorly equipped despite donations of guns from the armed forces. Nevertheless, Shining Path guerrillas were attacked by the rondas. The first-reported attack was near Huata in January 1983, where some rondas killed 13 guerrillas. In February 1983 in Sacsamarca, rondas stabbed and killed the Shining Path commanders of that area. In March 1983, rondas brutally killed Olegario Curitomay, one of the commanders of the town of Lucanamarca. They took him to the town square, stoned him, stabbed him, set him on fire, and finally shot him. Shining Path responded by entering the province of Huancasancos and the towns of Yanaccollpa, Ataccara, Llacchua, Muylacruz, and Lucanamarca, where they killed 69 people. Other similar incidents followed, such as the ones in Hauyllo, the Tambo District, and the La Mar Province. In the Ayacucho Department, Shining Path killed 47 peasants. Additional massacres would culminate in August 1985, with the infamous Accomarca massacre perpetrated by Peruvian troops on 16 August 1985 and one in Marcas that was perpetrated by Shining Path on 29 August 1985.

=== García administration (1985–1990) ===
During the government of Alan García, rivalries between the National Police and the Armed Forces increased. In one incident in 1989 in the Uchiza District, the Armed Forces ignored calls for assistance from the National Police despite being ten minutes away and having helicopters, resulting with the National Police post being captured by Shining Path.

During this period, the Shining Path had been the driving force of the Maoist Revolutionary Internationalist Movement (RIM), created a year prior. It had also allied itself with the Abu Nidal Organization (ANO), which had taught its members "urban terrorist tactics" and were linked to the attempted bombing of the U.S. embassy, both in 1988, resulting in a total payment of $4 million through the Bank of Credit & Commerce International.

=== Fujimori administration (1990–2000) ===
Under the administration of Alberto Fujimori, the state began its widespread use of intelligence agencies in the fight against Shining Path. Some atrocities were committed by the National Intelligence Service, notably the La Cantuta massacre, the Barrios Altos massacre and the Santa massacre. Under the government of Alberto Fujimori, the confrontation was waged mainly through bomb attacks and selective assassinations by the Shining Path. The government began to use death squads in order to combat and eliminate suspected communist sympathizers, including the Grupo Colina and Rodrigo Franco Command. These groups often committed human rights abuses throughout Peru. Fujimori's government also used the rondas campesinas in order to combat the Shining Path and the MRTA in the rural countryside.

Events such as the "Asháninka holocaust" perpetrated by the Shining Path also occurred at this stage. The Peruvian government began a massive crackdown on the Shining Path using unused methods. Military personnel were dispatched to areas dominated by the Shining Path, especially Ayacucho, to fight the rebels. Ayacucho, Huancavelica, Apurímac and Huánuco were declared emergency zones, allowing for some constitutional rights to be suspended in those areas.

In 1991, the government began a program to train and arm the rondas.

On 5 April 1992, Fujimori made a self-coup with the aim of dissolving the opposition-controlled Congress of Peru and replace the Judiciary branch. The 1979 Constitution was abolished and a Constitutional crisis took place. Fujimori also announced that Peru would no longer be under the jurisdiction of the Inter-American Court of Human Rights.

As Shining Path began to lose ground in the Andes to the Peruvian state and the rondas, it decided to speed up its overall strategic plan. Shining Path declared that it had reached "strategic equilibrium" and was ready to begin its final assault on the cities of Peru. In 1992, Shining Path set off a powerful bomb in the Miraflores District of Lima in what became known as the Tarata bombing. This was part of a larger bombing campaign to follow suit in Lima.

On 12 September 1992, Peruvian police captured Guzmán and several Shining Path leaders in an apartment above a dance studio in the Surquillo district of Lima. The police had been monitoring the apartment, as a number of suspected Shining Path militants had visited it. An inspection of the garbage of the apartment produced empty tubes of a skin cream used to treat psoriasis, a condition that Guzmán was known to have. Shortly after the raid that captured Guzmán, most of the remaining Shining Path leadership fell as well.

Guzmán's role as the leader of Shining Path was taken over by Óscar Ramírez, who himself was captured by Peruvian authorities in 1999. After Ramírez's capture, the group splintered, guerrilla activity diminished sharply and previous conditions returned to the areas where the Shining Path had been active. Some Shining Path and MRTA remnants managed to stage minor scale attacks, such as the January 1993 wave of attacks and political assassinations that occurred in the run-up to the municipal elections, which also targeted U.S. interests; these included the bombing of two Coca-Cola plants on 22 January (by Shining Path); the RPG attack against the USIS Binational Center on 16 January; the bombing of a KFC restaurant on 21 January (both by the MRTA) and the car-bombing of the Peruvian headquarters of IBM on 28 January (by Shining Path). On 27 July 1993, Shining Path militants drove a car bomb into the U.S. Embassy in Lima, which left extensive damage on the complex (worth some US$250,000) and nearby buildings.

The 1993 Repentance Law had substantial success in encouraging defections from the guerillas.

The MRTA's forces were decimated both by the Repentance Law and by the imprisonment of its main leaders; among them, its main leader Víctor Polay, who had escaped from prison in 1990 and was recaptured in 1992. In 1996, an armed commando of 14 members of the MRTA, led by Néstor Cerpa Cartolini, stormed the residence of the Japanese ambassador in Peru, beginning the crisis of 72 hostages that lasted 126 days. The MRTA demanded the release of 462 members of the insurgent group, imprisoned by the government to free the hostages, a demand emphatically rejected by the government. The crisis ended when the Peruvian armed forces recaptured the embassy in a military action called Operation Chavín de Huántar, which allowed the release of the hostages with the exception of Carlos Giusti Acuña, a member of the Supreme Court, who died in the exchange of shots with the subversive group. The final result was the death of the 14 subversive members, including their leader and two officers (Lieutenant Colonel Juan Valer Sandoval and Lieutenant Raúl Jiménez Chávez) who fell in combat; With this coup, the MRTA disappeared as an armed actor in the conflict.

Shining Path was confined to their former headquarters in the Peruvian jungle and continued smaller attacks against the military, like the one that occurred on 2 October 1999, when a Peruvian Army helicopter was shot down by Shining Path guerrillas near Satipo (killing five) and stealing a PKM machine gun which was reportedly used in another attack against an Mi-17 in July 2003.

Despite Shining Path being mostly defeated, more than 25% of Peru's national territory remained under a state of emergency until early 2000.

== Military analysis ==
Military historian Sara Blake, writing in the Small War's journal, analyzed the "Peruvian government effectively decapitated the Shining Path, but failed to address the root causes of the insurgency".

The Peruvian government successfully mobilized local self defence forces the "rondas campesinas", or peasant patrols. These groups relieved central military forces from garrison requirements, which both enabled their coordination against insurgents but also prevented friction between locals and soldiers as most contact between civilians and government forces involved these local groups. Military and police atrocities became less common as the conflict progressed as community groups took a greater role in security policy in the highland area. Blake notes that "the massive expansion of the organizations in 1990 and 1991 corresponded to a 30 percent decline in recorded casualties and deaths in the departments of Andahuaylas, Apurímac, Ayacucho and Junín".

President Fujimori passed a national law in 1992 giving the rondas campesina the right to bear arms, this was a highly symbolic gesture as it repealed colonial era legislation which forbade native Indians from possessing modern military technologies.

A second successful adoption of the Peruvian government in the latter period of the conflict was the passage of Repentance laws that allowed lower level supporters of Shining Path to receive amnesties or only short sentences. This separated the interests of the leadership from the rank and file. Human intelligence gathered from defectors proved useful in targeting the remaining Shining Path cells and the leadership.

Even though Peru was until 1980 ruled by a military junta there was not a complete absence of popular influence on policy especially at a local level, rural cooperatives and federations allowed the pursuit of development and expression of left-wing positions without insurgency. With the transition to democracy in 1980, leftist political parties were able to operate such as Alianza Popular Revolucionaria Americana, whose candidate Alan Garcia would win the presidency in 1985 and see the party win over 100 seats in the chamber of deputies. The expanding allowance for democratic participation for all citizens including those of left-wing perspectives increasingly undercuts Shining Path.

But neither of these successful counterinsurgency approaches would have been possible by the Peruvian government had it not been for the extreme brutality of Shining Path, which isolated it from the communities it purported to be conducting a revolution for. Carlos Iván Degregori described Andean peasant society a society "with a precarious economy that establishes intricate networks of kinship and complex strategies of reproduction. Due to the poor agricultural conditions one had to take great care to protect the labor force", this economic interest ran counter to the massacres employed by Shining Path that decimated communities. The violence further provided an incentive for many fighters to take up offers of amnesty and for others to join local defence forces.

Shining Path further failed to attract any external support, a difficult position to square with its political ideology which was "revisionist" and not compatible with any contemporaneous communist states. Shining Path's ultimate flaw was its centralized organization, with reducing popular support and many of its members deserting when offered amnesty the eventual capture of Guzmán paralyzed the organization. Colby argues that the rapid decline of Shining Path was not simply a result of its lack of leadership in the aftermath of Guzmán's capture but that the organization had been precipitously weakened by a successful counterinsurgency strategy by the Peruvian government.

Thus although Peruvian strategy had been muddled and characterized by extreme brutality especially in the early phases, it did adapt and though the employment of local forces had the most success. However, while some federal reform was enacted the broader socio-economic forces that fed the insurgency were left unaddressed.

== Truth and Reconciliation Commission ==
Alberto Fujimori resigned the Presidency in 2000, but Congress declared him "morally unfit", installing the opposite congress member Valentín Paniagua into office. He rescinded Fujimori's announcement that Peru would leave the Inter-American Court of Human Rights and established a Truth and Reconciliation Commission (CVR) to investigate the conflict. The commission was headed by the President of the Pontifical Catholic University of Peru Salomón Lerner Febres. The Commission found in its 2003 Final Report that 69,280 people died or disappeared between 1980 and 2000 as a result of the armed conflict. A statistical analysis of the available data led the Truth and Reconciliation Commission to estimate that the Shining Path was responsible for the death or disappearance of 31,331 people, 45% of the total deaths and disappearances. According to a summary of the report by Human Rights Watch, "Shining Path ... killed about half the victims, and roughly one-third died at the hands of government security forces ... The commission attributed some of the other slayings to a smaller guerrilla group and local militias. The rest remain unattributed."

According to the final report, rural areas were disproportionately affected by violence, especially those of indigenous communities. 75% of the people who were either killed or disappeared spoke Quechua as their native language, despite the fact that the 1993 census found that only 20% of Peruvians speak Quechua or another indigenous language as their native language.

Nevertheless, the final report of the CVR was surrounded by controversy. It was criticized by almost all political parties (including former Presidents Fujimori, García and Paniagua), the military and the Catholic Church, which claimed that many of the Commission members were former members of extreme leftist movements and that the final report wrongfully portrayed Shining Path and the MRTA as "political parties" rather than as terrorist organizations, even though, for example, Shining Path has been clearly designated as a terrorist organization by the United States, the European Union, and Canada.

A 2019 study disputed the casualty figures from the Truth and Reconciliation Commission, estimating instead "a total of 48,000 killings, substantially lower than the TRC estimate" and concluding that "the Peruvian State accounts for a significantly larger share than the Shining Path." The TRC later came out to respond to these statements.

== Second phase (2001–present) ==
Following the capture of Óscar Ramírez Durand in 1999, the Shining Path's remnants splintered into a number of factions which gradually based themselves in the VRAEM area—located in portions of the departments of Ayacucho, Cuzco, Huancavelica, and Junín—as participants of the local narcotrafficking scene. Due to this change in operations, the number of incidents relating to the conflict have largely decreased in comparison to the 1980–2000 period.

=== Early incidents (2001–2011) ===
On Thursday, 9 August 2001, an armed shootout between Peruvian policemen and Shining Path guerrillas took place in Satipo province. Police forces had broken through a primary line of defence as part of a special operation while underestimating the group's numbers, who had coincidentally reunited and thus increased their numbers. This led to a shootout that lasted five hours and took the lives of four policemen and twelve Shining Path fighters. In September of the same year, Gino Costa, then Vice-Minister of the Interior, stated that a comprehensive strategy was launched to promote peace and development in areas where some terrorist remnants operated.

On 20 March 2002, a car bomb exploded at El Polo, a mall located next to the U.S. embassy in Monterrico, a wealthy neighbourhood of Santiago de Surco, a district of Lima. Then president Alejandro Toledo reacted by immediately returned to the country from Monterrey. The attack took place less than 48 hours prior to the arrival of U.S. President George W. Bush, who travelled to the country nevertheless. The United States suspected that guerillas from the left-wing Shining Path terror group perpetrated the attack. In November of the same year, an ambush led to the death of one police officer, with four others injured.

On 9 June 2003, a Shining Path group attacked a camp in Ayacucho, and took 68 employees of the Argentine company Techint and three police guards hostage. The hostages worked at the Camisea gas pipeline project that takes natural gas from Cuzco to Lima. According to sources from Peru's Interior Ministry, the hostage-takers asked for a sizable ransom to free the hostages. Two days later, after a rapid military response, the hostage-takers abandoned the hostages. According to some sources, the company paid the ransom. On 12 June, an ambush on an army patrol left seven soldiers dead. On 25 June, police sub-officer Edgar García Villena was killed in Pampa Aurora, and a rondero was killed alongside two family members in Bagua, Junín. At the time, the Police's DIRCOTE unit had identified four so-called "companies" of the group:

- A company in Santo Domingo de Acobamba District ("Base 18 company") was headed by comrades "Guillermo" and "Rodolfo".
- Another company in Pangoa District ("Pangoa company") was headed by comrades "Román" and "Dalton"
- Another company to the south, in Vizcatán, was headed by comrades "Alipio" and "Raúl".
- Finally, a command post headed by "Comrade José" to the south of Pangoa also featured a security section.

In 2003, the Constitutional Court of Peru abolished Fujimori's anti-terrorism laws, leading to Guzmán's sentence of life imprisonment being overturned, with a new civilian trial taking place. The following year, 17 members of the group were arrested in September.

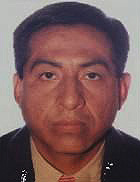
"Comrade Artemio" led a Shining Path faction until his capture in 2012.

A faction of the Shining Path in an area known as the Upper Huallaga was led by Florindo Eleuterio Flores Hala ("Comrade Artemio"), who operated through a continued series of attacks with the intended eventual release of Guzmán. This strategy failed, as Guzmán was sentenced to life in prison for terrorism charges on 13 October 2006. Víctor Polay, a former MRTA leader, had been sentenced to 32 years in prison on 22 March of the same year.

On 17 May 2007, a homemade bomb in a backpack was set off at Túpac Amaru International Market in the southern Peruvian city of Juliaca, killing six and wounding 48. Because of the timing of the attack, the Shining Path was suspected by Peruvian authorities of holding responsibility. Due to the date, the attack was suspected to be linked to the Shining Path. On the 22nd of the same month, Peruvian police arrested two Shining Path members in the town of Churcampa. On 20 September of the same year, Peruvian police arrested 3 Shining Path insurgents in the city of Huancayo, Junín province.

On 18 November 2007, Peruvian analyst Roger Rumrill claimed that local Asháninka tribes in the VRAEM had pointed to him the exact locations of the so-called "sanctuaries" where the rebels operated, and that these locations had been pointed to the Armed Forces and Police repeatedly since the 1990s, accusing them of inaction to guarantee their continued funding.

On 25 March 2008, Shining Path rebels killed a police officer and wounded 11, while they were on patrol duty. On 10 October of the same year, a military convoy in Tintaypunco was ambushed with an initial explosive charge and subsequent shooting, leading to the deaths of 19 people (of which 12 were soldiers), 11 injuries and one disappearance. On the 15th, Shining Path insurgents attacked an army patrol, killing two and wounding five. On the 20th, a group of 30 to 50 Shining Path insurgents entered a camp set up by the mining company Doe Run. After delivering a short Maoist propaganda speech, before leaving, the militants stole communications equipment and food. On 26 November, an ambush in the Huallaga Valley by the group killed four policemen and injured four others.

In 2015, the U.S. Treasury Department declared the Shining Path a narco-terrorist organization engaged in the taxing of the production, processing, and transport, of cocaine. The allegations of Shining Path drug trafficking had been made by the Peruvian government prior to the U.S. decree. This decree froze all Shining Path financial assets in the United States. U.S. Treasury official John Smith stated that the decree would help "the government of Peru's efforts to actively combat the group".

On 9 April 2009, 13 soldiers, including an officer, were killed in two ambushes that used dynamite against two patrol units to the northeast of Sanabamba, part of the VRAEM in northern Ayacucho. Additionally, four other people were injured. On 2 August of the same year, 50 rebels attacked San José de Secce with weapons and explosives, leaving 5 dead. On 26 August, two soldiers were killed in two separate incidents outside San Antonio de Carrizales, and on 31 August, three soldiers were wounded at the same place. On 2 September, Shining Path militants shot down a Peruvian Air Force Mi-17 helicopter, later killing the two pilots with small arms fire.

On 5 June 2011, a patrol sent to guide the electoral process in Choquetira (Cuzco) was ambushed by Shining Path militants, leaving five dead.

=== Peruvian counter-offensive (2012–2016) ===
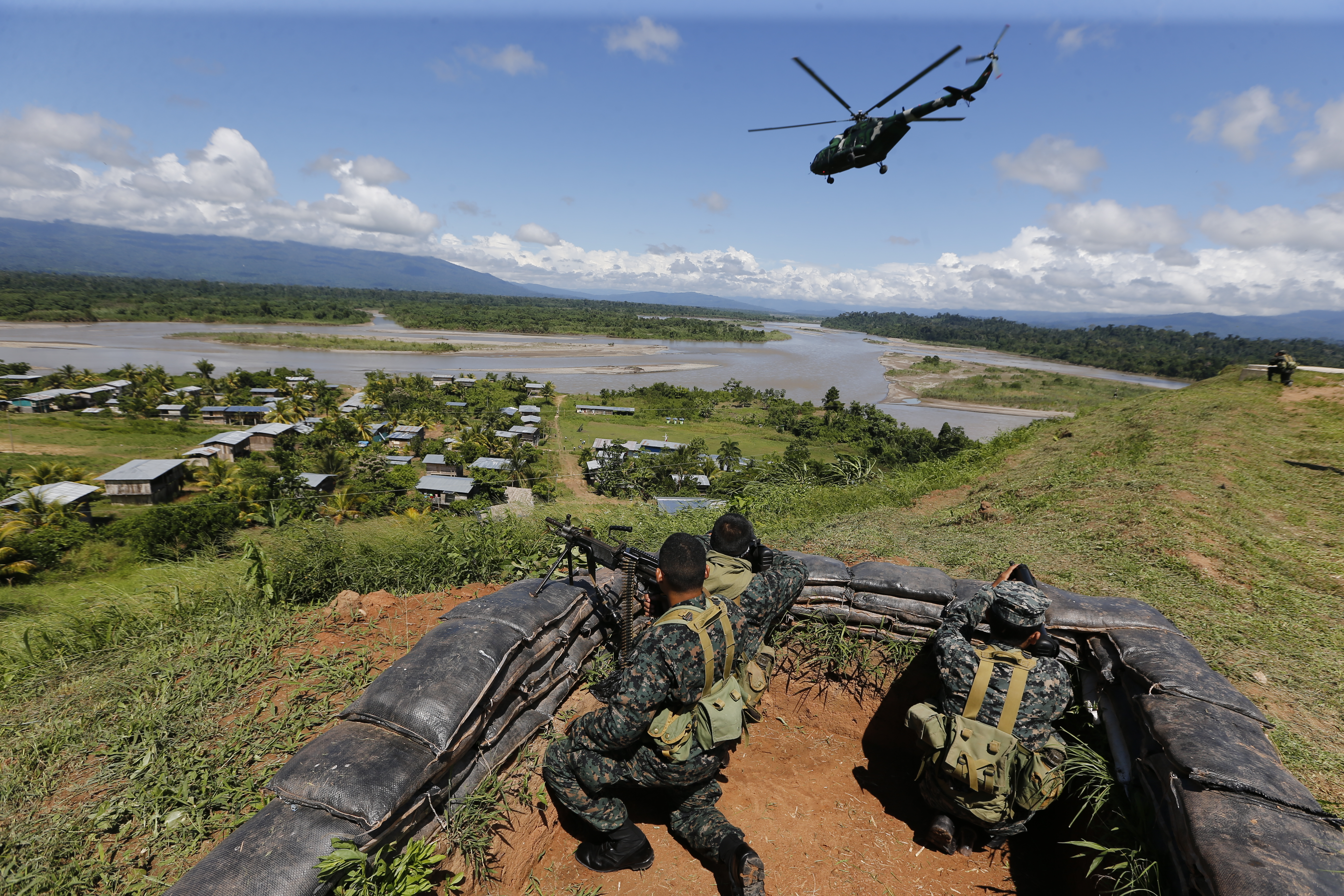
Supervision of counter-terrorism bases in the VRAEM

On 12 February 2012, the leader of the Huallaga faction, Florindo Eleuterio Flores Hala ("Comrade Artemio"), was captured by a combined Peruvian police and army force in Tocache in the midst of a firefight and wounded by a bullet. This led to the dissolution of the faction, with then president Ollanta Humala stating that the task now would be to intensify the fight against the remaining factions in the VRAEM area, the epicentre of drug trafficking in the country, led by the Quispe Palomino brothers: Jorge ("Comrade Raúl") and Víctor ("Comrade José").

On 27 April of the same year, Shining Path militants killed three soldiers and wounded two others in the aftermath of an ambush. On 9 May, the Peruvian Police began an operation in the Peruvian Amazon when Shining Path took up to 40 hostages, demanding a $10 million ransom. One-and-a-half thousand soldiers were deployed into the abduction area, and ultimately a Police Mil Mi-17 helicopter crashed after a Shining Path sniper killed its pilot, with four soldiers being wounded by the crash. By this point, 71 men of the country's security forces had been killed by Shining Path ambushes in the VRAE region and 59 wounded since 2008. On 9 September, a joint police–military operation led to the killing of Víctor Hugo Castro Ramírez ("Comrade William"), (Note: Also known as "Comrade Guillermo", "El Gringo" or "El Gato".) known as the group's sniper, after he was abandoned by his fellow rebels and ultimately surrounded in Llochegua, where he was shot eight times.

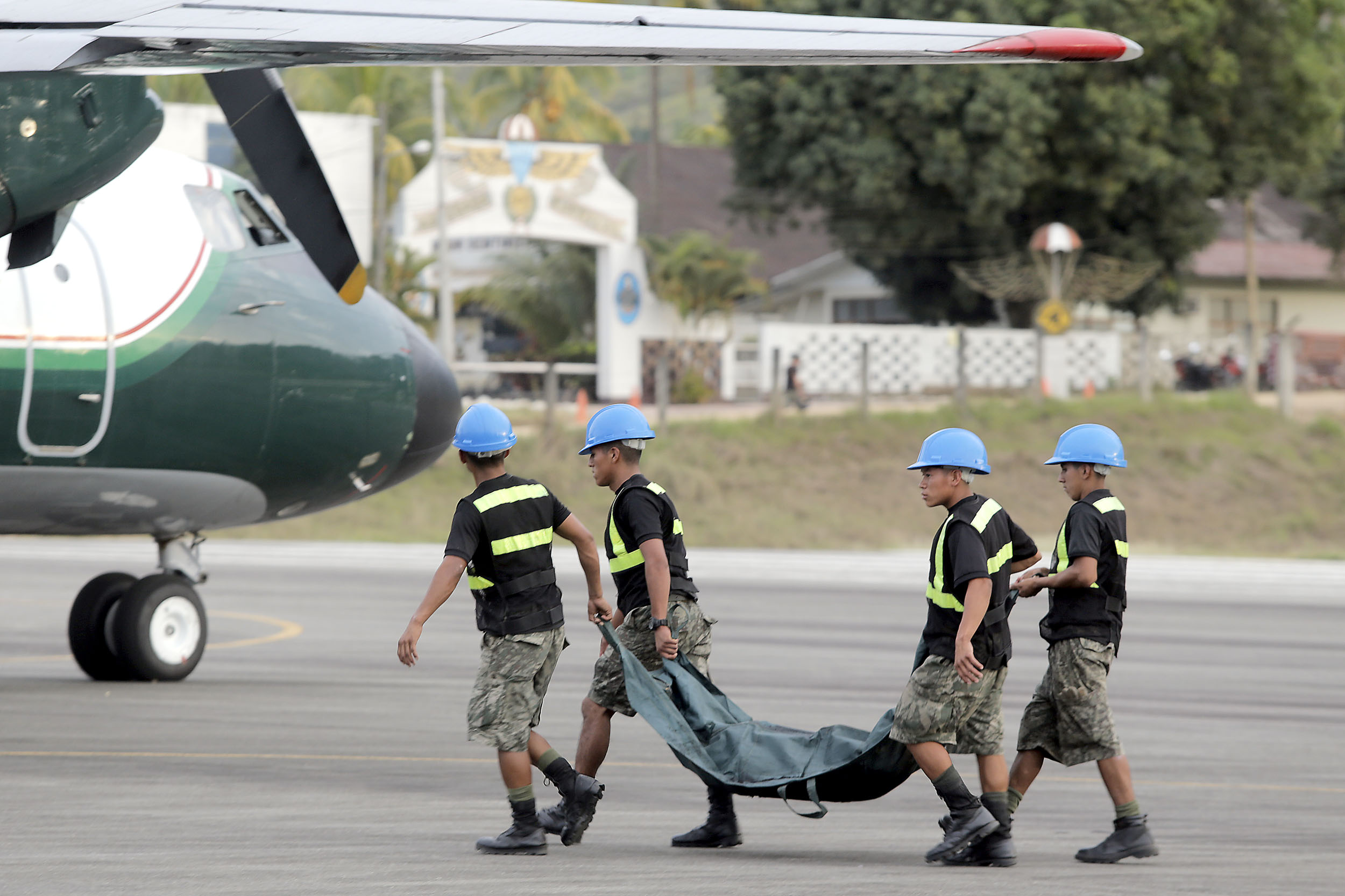
The bodies of "Alipio" and "Gabriel" at the Sinchis' base in Mazamari

On 11 August 2013, a joint police–military operation led to the killings of three Shining Path members, including Alejandro Borda Casafranca ("Comrade Alipio") and Martín Quispe Palomino ("Comrade Gabriel" and brother of "Comrade José"), numbers two and four of the organization, respectively. Their deaths were a major blow to the group, being replaced by Alexander Alarcón Soto ("Comrade Renán") and Dionisio Ramos Limaquispe ("Comrade Yuri"), respectively. Both were captured in August 2015 by DIRCOTE units, when they were in the middle of preparations for an attack on the Camisea Gas Project. On 8 November 2013, Peruvian Army General Cesar Díaz was removed from the position of Chief of the Joint Command of Special Operations and the Intelligence Command in the VRAEM. The decision came in the aftermath of 16 October 2003, aerial bombing of Mazangaro which killed one civilian and injured four others.

In February 2014, the Shining Path were reported to have attacked a Transportadora de Gas del Peru natural gas work camp in Peru's Cusco region. On 10 April of the same year, Peruvian authorities arrested 24 people on charges of Shining Path affiliation. On 18 June, Security forces killed three and injured one Shining Path insurgents during an apartment raid in the Echarate region, and on 2 October policemen were killed and at least five injured when they were attacked by Shining Path militants in the VRAEM region. On 14 October, one soldier was killed and four injured in the aftermath of an ambush conducted between Chalhuamayo and the town of San Francisco, VRAEM. A civilian was also injured in the attack. On 17 December, the garrison of the Llochegua army base, in Huanta province, successfully repelled a Shining Path attack, one soldier was wounded following the skirmish.

On 28 October 2014, a Lebanese citizen identified as 28-year-old Muhamad Ghaleb Hamdar was arrested by DIRCOTE on identity fraud and conspiracy to commit terrorism charges at his apartment in Surquillo, a district of Lima. Ghaleb had arrived in Lima a year prior, on 3 November, with a counterfeit Sierra Leonean passport. He soon married Carmen Carrión Vela, a Peruvian American with double citizenship, which allowed him to reside in the U.S. After leaving the country for Brazil on 11 March 2014, he returned on 8 July, the same day his wife also returned from the U.S. until her departure on 9 October. Upon being arrested, explosives, encrypted files, memory cards and pictures of possible targets were found in his possession. His wife was arrested on 26 November of the following year. Hamdar was convicted of identity fraud and absolved of his conspiracy charges in 2016, although the latter was annulled and a new trial began in 2019 until its annulment in 2023 due to "procedural errors", during which he was reported to have confessed to being a member of Hezbollah, and designated a Specially Designated Global Terrorist.

In 2015, new alliances were made to oppose the Peruvian government. According to later reports, Julio César Vásquez Vásquez, a former member of the defunct MRTA, had established a rump successor of the group that year, while the Shining Path had been reported to have made an alliance with the "Cafeteros", a Colombian drug trafficking group also based in the VRAEM. Politically, people linked to the Shining Path also created the "Front for Unity and Defence of the Peruvian People" (FUDEPP), which unsuccessfully sought to participate in the oncoming elections.

An operation in August of the same year led to the release from captivity of 54 Asháninka Indians, of which 34 were children. The group was subject to forced labour in so-called "production centres" of the group, among other crimes, while the children were indoctrinated into the group's ideology until the age of 15, when they were formally incorporated into the group. At the time of the operation, it was believed that 270 to 300 people were still being held captive, of which 70 or 80 were children.

On 9 April 2016, two soldiers and one civilian were killed, and six other soldiers were injured when militants believed to be part of the Shining Path group attacked a truck carrying soldiers to protect voting stations in Lima, as Presidential Elections were to be held the following day. On 2 August of the same year, the Joint Command of the Armed Forces reported that suspected militants attacked a military base in Mazamari a district of the VRAEM Valley, leaving one soldier wounded. On the 22nd of the same month, the United States Department of State designated the Shining Path's leadership (the Quispe Palomino brothers and Tarcela "Comrade Olga" Loya Vílchez) as terrorists, offering a $5 million bounty for information leading to the capture or killing of "Comrade José".

In July of the same year, reports emerged that a Hezbollah-affiliated political party based in Abancay, the Partido de Dios, intended to participate in that year's elections. In Peru, Hezbollah has been accused of being affiliated with the Shining Path. The political group was led by Argentine Sheikh Ali Abdurrahman Pohl and Edwar Quiroga Vargas, a Peruvian Islamic activist and open Hezbollah supporter involved in that year's protests against Las Bambas. Quiroga was also a former candidate of the Ethnocacerist movement in 2010, and leader of the Islamic Centre of Peru, which had intimate connections to the Plurinational Association of Tawantinsuyo Reservists (ASPRET) an ethnocacerist paramilitary.

On 27 September, at least three people—one soldier, and two civilians—were injured in a shooting, leading to one person being detained in Huancavelica. On 13 December, a policeman died during an operation in the town of Apachita in the VRAEM, and the following day, two policemen and four individuals were killed, with another policeman injured, after a clash in the VRAEM.

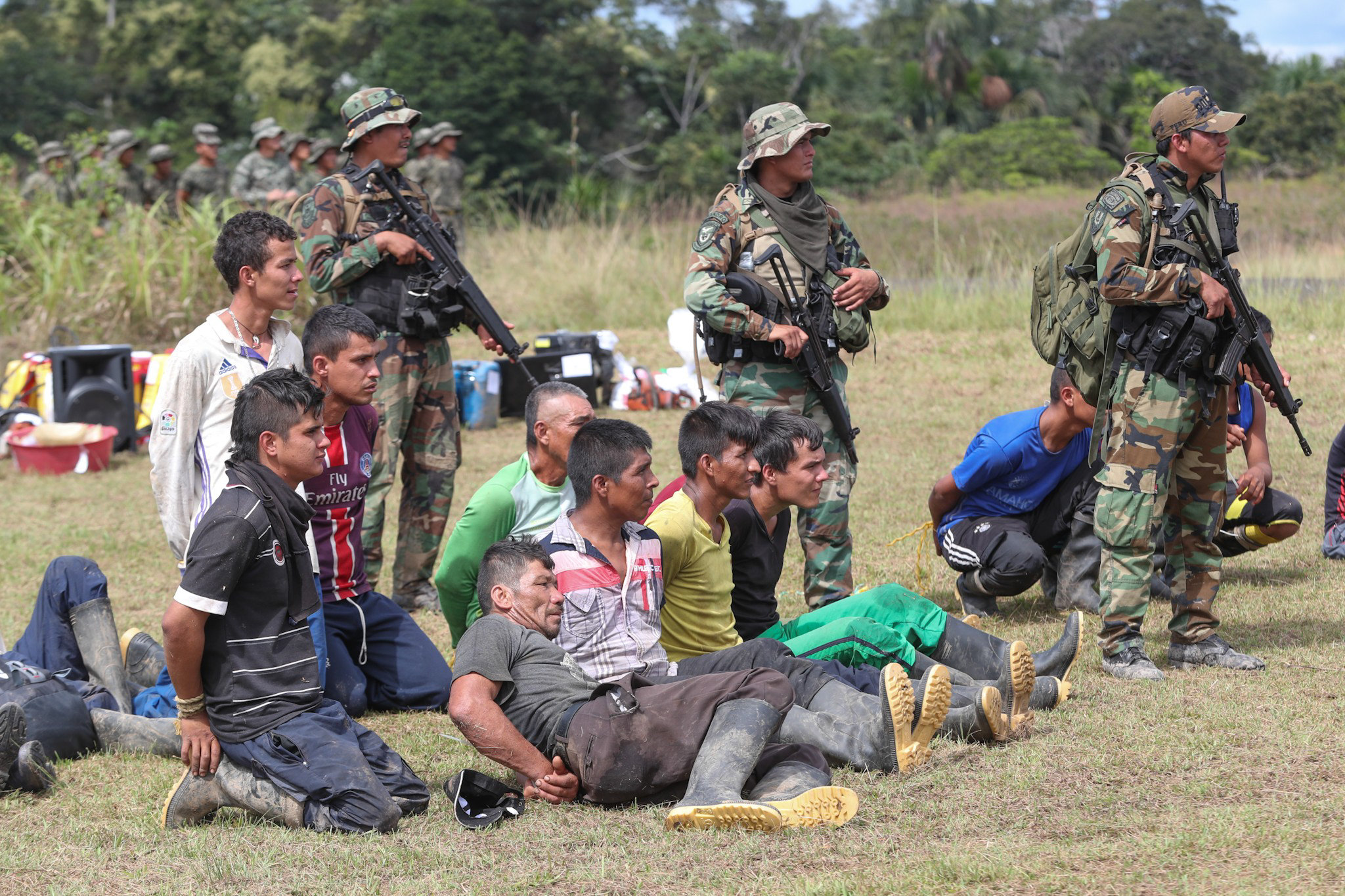
FARC dissidents arrested in Peru as part of "Operation Armageddon"

Until 2016, the Shining Path had allied itself with the Revolutionary Armed Forces of Colombia (FARC–EP), with which it had coordinated military training operations since 2006. After the group signed a final peace agreement that put an end to armed hostilities in Colombia, the Shining Path allied itself with the "Oliver Sinisterra Front", led by "Guacho" as one of many post-agreement dissident groups in the northern jungle of the Department of Loreto, specifically Ramón Castilla District. At the time, the group's Mantaro faction had been reported to have been supported by groups in four Latin American countries:

- In Chile, by the Frente Estudiantil Revolucionario y Popular (FERP), and the Partido Comunista de Chile (Red Fraction).
- In Ecuador, by the Frente de Defensa de Luchas del Pueblo (FDLP), the Partido Comunista de Ecuador Sol Rojo (PCE-SR), and the Cleomar Rodríguez Group.
- In Brazil, by the Partido Comunista do Brasil (Red Fraction), the Liga dos Camponeses Pobres (LCP), the Movimento Estudantil Popular Revolucionário, and the Movimento Feminino Popular (MFP).
- In Mexico, by the Oaxaca-based Communist Party of Mexico – Red Sun (PCM–SR).

=== Continued activity (2017–present) ===
On 12 March 2017, Shining Path militants attacked a military helicopter, which returned fire and injured a number of rebels. On 18 March, three police officers were killed in Curumpiaria (Ayacucho), a town in the VRAEM region. Another attack left one fatality and two injuries on 31 May, in Luricocha District, and another attack on 21 July left ten injuries on the Peruvian side, and 30 deaths on the rebel side, as well as one rebel captured. On 1 August, one soldier died and seven other rebels were wounded in an ambush, while one soldier and other three people were injured in another location of the same district. September saw three attacks on the 6th, where three police officers were killed in Churcampa, and on the 22nd, where a military patrol and a rebel group clashed in the VRAEM without any injuries, but another attack saw four injured, one missing, and two dead (a policeman and a guide) near the 116th kilometre of the Interoceanic Highway in Madre de Dios.

Flag used by FUDARP, the MPCP–ASPRET alliance (2018–2022)

The first attack of 2018 took place on 7 June, when four policemen were killed in an ambush in Anco District, Churcampa. Two days later, Víctor Quispe Palomino ("Comrade José") released a statement declaring himself the leader of the Shining Path, and announcing its restructuring as the Militarized Communist Party of Peru (MPCP), as well as its intention to carry out more attacks. An alliance with the Plurinational Association of Tawantinsuyo Reservists (ASPRET) to form the United Democratic Andean Revolutionary Front of Peru (FUDARP) was also announced. On the 11th, a group of militants attacked a military base in Mazángaro, injuring six soldiers. On 19 September, an ambush led to the killing of "Comrade Basilio" and an unnamed second rebel.

On 26 February 2019, a police–military operation in Pucacolpa District led to the killing of "Comrade Leonidas", who was in charge of the security forces protecting Jorge Quispe Palomino ("Comrade Raúl"). By this point, the VRAEM was the main cocaine production site in the continent, and its citizenry lived under poor conditions, with 53% suffering of malnutrition and 36% being illiterate, and 77% of houses lacking drinking water or a sewerage system. Forced labour was still in widespread use, and military forces operated in poor conditions. On 9 May, a column entered Roble District to transport materials, including chemicals. On 21 July, an attack in Huanta District led to the capture of weapons and munitions left behind by the group, believed to have acted in response to the capture of "Julio Chapo" (or "Sergio").

On 21 December 2020, one Navy serviceman was killed and three others are wounded after being shot at while patrolling the Ene River on three river hovercraft in Junín.

On 23 May 2021, during that year's elections, remnants of the Shining Path massacred civilians at San Miguel del Ene, a town in the VRAEM region. Various sources claimed that the death toll of the attack is between 16 and 18 residents.

On 11 August 2022, a joint police–military operation (codenamed Operación Patriota) took place in Vizcatán with the goal of capturing Víctor Quispe Palomino ("Comrade José"), leader of the MPCP. It led to the capture of the area, although Quispe managed to escape, albeit wounded. The operation led to the capture of documents and weaponry, and the killing of 10 to 15 terrorists, with two military soldiers also killed. Another operation took place in Huanta on 28 September, led by DIRCOTE, where weaponry and explosives were seized.

On 11 February 2023, seven police officers were killed, and another one injured, when their vehicle was ambushed in the VRAEM region, in a suspected attack by remnants of Shining Path. On 13 March, one soldier was killed in a clash at Quebrada Eloy. Four days later, the capture of "Comrade Álvaro" and "Comrade Paulino" was announced.

On 8 April, Asháninka leader Santiago Contoricón, who had previously been a vocal opponent of the group, was shot by hitmen at his home in Puerto Ocopa. In response, local asháninkas carried out a strike, which concluded with the disappearance of four people.

On 15 June, Carlos Solier Zúñiga ("Comrade Carlos") was captured in Ocaña, accused of being behind the attacks in Pichari and San Miguel del Ene. On 26 July, a military helicopter was attacked over Llochegua District, with one minor being injured. On 4 September, at least six people were killed in a clash, including four soldiers and two militants. On 25 September, a nurse, who had been kidnapped on 7 September in San Juan Mantaro, was executed by rebels after they accused him of spying for the Peruvian Armed Forces.

In September 2024, a military operation saw the capture of Octavio Vargas Ñahuicopa (also known as "Ciperian"), who was identified as a main figure in the group. In October of the same year, a police operation led to the arrest of Iván Quispe Palomino, erroneously reported as a leader of the group. Despite being one of the Quispe Palomino siblings, he had no links to them of the group since his release from prison in 2005.

On 27 September 2026 the Defense Ministry of Peru reported Peruvian special forces launched a surprise assault named Operation Zancudo in the village of San Belín de Yaricaya in the Teniente Manuel Clavero district, Peruvian Amazon, targeting members of the Colombian FARC front Comandos de la Frontera. No official casualties were reported.

== See also ==
- List of films about the internal conflict in Peru
- Communism in Peru
- Blood quota
