= 3rd Army Division (Peru) =

Division of the Peruvian Army

- III División de Ejército
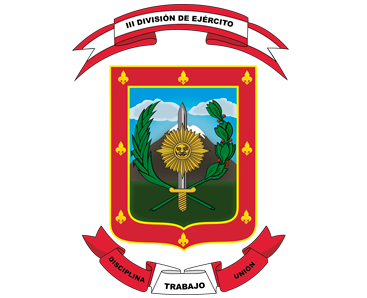
- Country: Peru
- Branch: Peruvian Army
- Size: Division
- Garrison: Arequipa
- Nickname(s): III DE
- Motto(s): Disciplina, Trabajo, Unión
- Anniversaries: 15 December
- Engagements: Internal conflict in Peru
- Website: Facebook

Commanders
- Current commander: Jorge Agramonte Aguilar

The 3rd Army Division (Spanish: III División de Ejército) is a combined infantry division unit of the Peruvian Army (EP) that specialized in combat patrol in mountain forest terrain, combined arms, irregular warfare, jungle and mountain warfare, and maneuver warfare.

== History ==
The unit was created on 15 December 1961 and activated on the same date a year later, named as the 3rd Military Region (Spanish: III Región Militar). From 2002 until 2013 it was known as the Southern Military Region (Spanish: Región Militar del Sur).

The unit's coat of arms features both Republican and Incan symbolism similar to that of other units, as well as the Misti, located in the outskirts of Arequipa.

== Organization ==
The 3rd Army Division is formed by the following units:

- 3rd Armored Brigade
- 6th Armored Brigade
- 3rd Cavalry Brigade
- 4th Mountain Brigade
- 5th Mountain Brigade
- 6th Special Forces Brigade
- 3rd Divisional Communications Brigade
- 3rd Divisional Air Defense Artillery
- 1st Services Brigade
- Anti-aircraft Rocket Group Crl. José Gálvez

== See also ==
- 1st Army Division
- 2nd Army Division
- 4th Army Division
- 5th Army Division
