= 4th Army Division (Peru) =

Division of the Peruvian Army

- IV División de Ejército
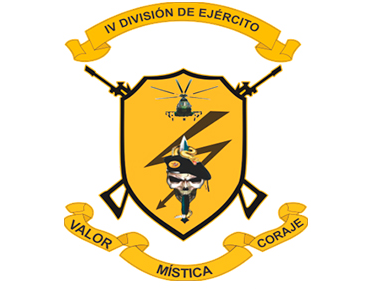
- Country: Peru
- Branch: Peruvian Army
- Size: Division
- Garrison: Fuerte Pichari
- Nickname(s): IV DE
- Motto(s): Valor, Mística, Coraje
- Engagements: Internal conflict in Peru: Hatun Asha ambush; Llochegua Clashes
- Website: Facebook

Commanders
- Current commander: Miguel Gonzales Bohórquez

The 4th Army Division (Spanish: IV División de Ejército) is a combined infantry division unit of the Peruvian Army (EP) that specialized in combat patrol in mountain forest terrain, combined arms, counterinsurgency, military engineering, and jungle warfare.

== History ==
The unit was officially established by the Peruvian Joint Command as the VRAE Military Region (Spanish: Región Militar del Valle de los ríos Apurímac y Ene) on 13 March 2008. Its jurisdiction is limited to the Apurímac–Ene Valley Area, having been specifically created in order to deal with narcoterrorism and cocaine production in the area, where much of the drug trade is controlled by remants of the Shining Path guerrilla group. The unit acquired its current name in 2013.

In 2016, on the eve of that year's general election, the division's 311th Counterinsurgency Battalion, part of the 31st Infantry Brigade, was ambushed by Shining Path insurgents, leaving 11 dead and 5 wounded.

The unit's coat of arms features two crossed Galil rifles.

== Organization ==
The 4th Army Division is formed by the following units:

- 2nd Infantry Brigade
- 31st Infantry Brigade
- 32nd Engineering Brigade
- 33rd Infantry Brigade

== See also ==
- 1st Army Division
- 2nd Army Division
- 3rd Army Division
- 5th Army Division
