= 2nd Army Division (Peru) =

Division of the Peruvian Army

- II División de Ejército
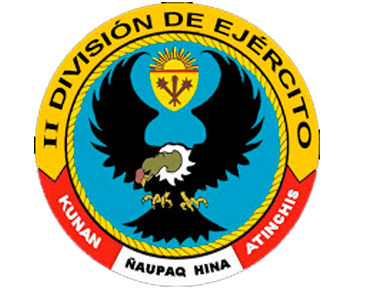
- Country: Peru
- Branch: Peruvian Army
- Size: Division
- Garrison: Rímac
- Nickname: II DE
- Mottos: Hoy como ayer, ¡vencer siempre vencer!
- Engagements: Limazo; Internal conflict in Peru
- Website: Facebook

Commanders
- Current commander: Cesar Briceño Valdivia

The 2nd Army Division (Spanish: II División de Ejército) is a combined infantry division unit of the Peruvian Army (EP) that specializes in combat patrol in mountain forest terrain, combined arms, irregular warfare, jungle and mountain warfare, and maneuver warfare.

== History ==
The 2nd Army Division was created on 15 December 1961 in Lima as 2nd Military Region. For several years it shared its headquarters with the premises of the Ministry of War.

In 1975, what started as a police strike soon turned into a riot across Lima, later known as the Limazo. After members of the Civil Guard barricaded themselves in their Radio Patrulla barracks, the 2nd Division was ordered to remove them by force, which was done on the same day.

In 1987, it was installed in the Rafael Hoyos Rubio Military Fort, located at Rímac District, province of Lima. In 2003, it was renamed as the Central Military Region (Spanish: Región Militar del Centro), name it would bear until 2012.

Its coat of arms features the division's motto in quechua, as well as a condor and an emblem featuring Incan weapons.

== Organization ==
The 2nd Army Division is formed by the following units:

- 1st Special Forces Brigade
- 3rd Special Forces Brigade
- 18th Armored Brigade
- Rural Settlement Command
- Peruvian Guard Legion
  - Hussars of Junín
- "Mariscal Domingo Nieto" Cavalry Regiment Escort
- 1st Combat Support Brigade

== See also ==
- 1st Army Division
- 3rd Army Division
- 4th Army Division
- 5th Army Division
