= San Miguel del Ene attack =

Terrorist attack in Peru

San Miguel del Ene massacre
- Part of the internal conflict in Peru
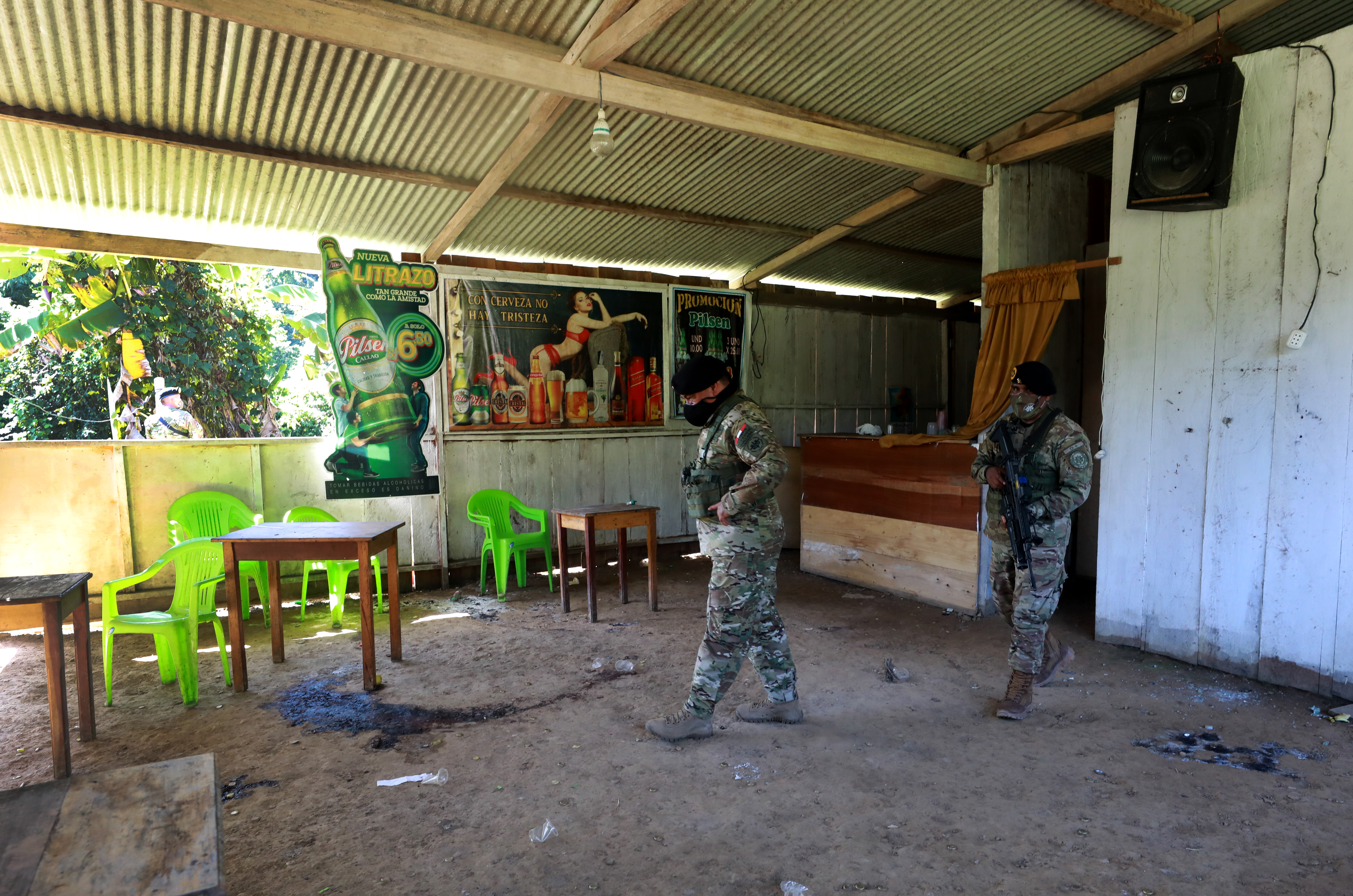

- Location of San Miguel del Ene in Peru
- Location: 12°11′20″S 74°01′33″W; San Miguel del Ene, Vizcatán del Ene district, Peru
- Date: 23 May 2021; Around 22:00 (UTC−05:00)
- Target: LGBTQ community
- Attack type: Mass shooting
- Weapon: Firearms
- Deaths: 18
- Perpetrators: Militarized Communist Party of Peru (MPCP; split of Shining Path)
- Motive: Anti-LGBT sentiment

The San Miguel del Ene attack was a massacre on 23 May 2021 in San Miguel del Ene, a rural area in the Vizcatán del Ene District of Satipo Province in Peru, in which 18 people were killed. The massacre was most likely perpetrated by the Militarized Communist Party of Peru (MPCP), a split of the Maoist terrorist organization Shining Path. The attack occurred in the Valle de los Ríos Apurímac, Ene y Mantaro (VRAEM) conflict region, where the group operates.

== Background ==
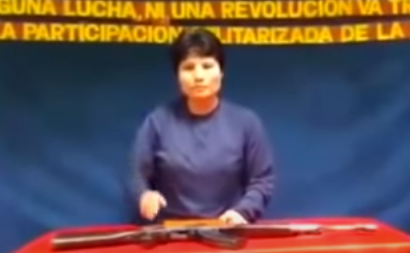
Comrade Vilma in 2018

Groups in VRAEM killed four family members in March 2021 in Huarcatán, accusing them of being police informers.

On 14 May, three weeks before the run-off vote in the 2021 presidential election, Comrade Vilma – who has close ties to Comrade José, head of the Militarized Communist Party of Peru – called for a boycott of the elections, specifically naming Keiko Fujimori and stating that anyone who voted for her would be an "accomplice in genocide and corruption". She had also made a similar call prior to the first round of the election, in which she criticized almost all the candidates but singled out Fujimori and Ollanta Humala as "direct enemies" of her organization.

== Motives ==
According to the leaflets found in the attack location, the perpetrators call upon to "clean VRAEM and Peru" of outcasts, "parasites and corrupts" as well as "homosexuals, lesbians, drug addicts" and "thieves".

== Investigation ==
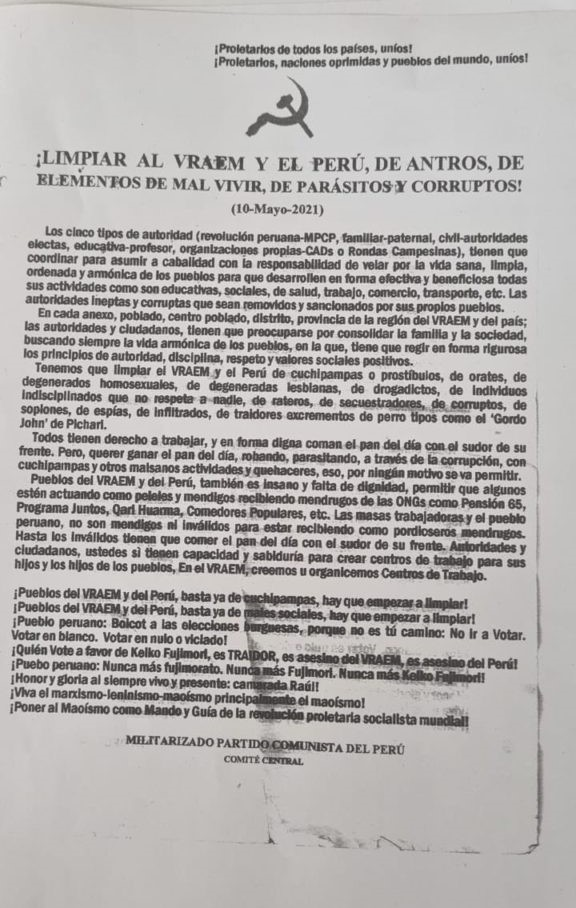
MPCP leaflet seized by the National Police of Peru dated 10 May 2021 and calling for a campaign of social cleansing.

The attack, which took place around 22:00 local time (UTC−05) on 23 May, was confirmed by general César Cervantes, commander general of the National Police of Peru, who informed about the mass shooting deaths of ten men, six women and two minors in a red-light zone bar in the locality. The Armed Forces of Peru released a statement prior to any investigations, naming Shining Path as the perpetrator, spreading confusion as the group had been long dissolved. The Ministry of Defense would later say the attack was perpetrated by the Shining Path faction led by Comrade José. It gave the death toll of 14 people. The National Police cautioned that responsibility should be assigned following a full investigation. Along with the corpses, some of which were burned, leaflets signed by the MPCP were reportedly found, featuring the hammer and sickle and defining the attack as a social cleansing operation. The leaflets also called for a boycott of the 6 June election, accusing of treason those who voted for Keiko Fujimori of the right-wing party Popular Force. The first analysis by the Counter Terrorism Directorate concluded with the preliminary result that the leaflets could have the characteristics of the language used by Shining Path.

Peruvian investigative journalism website OjoPúblico interviewed a survivor who said that the attackers were dressed in plainclothes and fired without making subversive statement. According to Jo-Marie Burt, the hurried manner in which the military and media in Peru described the attack as being perpetrated by Shining Path was an attempt to attack opposition to the conservative political establishment through an appeal to fear, especially using the terruqueo attack. OjoPúblico described the media release by the military as "an inaccurate reference to the Shining Path."

The Public Prosecution Service announced that the Huánuco and Selva Central Prosecutor Office specialized in crimes of terrorism and against humanity would take charge of the investigation and that the National Police would carry out the autopsies of the burned bodies, which would later be transferred to the Pichari District morgue.

== Reactions ==
Keiko Fujimori, presidential candidate of Popular Force, expressed categorical condemnation against the attack during a press conference in Tarapoto, as well as regret that "bloody acts" still happened in the country and her condolences to the relatives of the victims. Fujimori would go on to attempt to link Castillo to the attack.

Pedro Castillo, presidential candidate of Free Peru, expressed regret towards the events during a rally in Huánuco and solidarity towards the relatives of the victims. Castillo also urged the National Police to investigate the attack to clarify the events. Vladimir Cerrón, Secretary General of Free Peru, published a tweet saying that "the right-wing needed [Shining] Path to win". Cerrón deleted the tweet moments later, questioning afterwards which one of the ideologies needed the terrorist group to win and condemning any act of terrorism.

Prime Minister Violeta Bermúdez and Defense Minister Nuria Esparch condemned the attack and guaranteed that the electoral process would take place normally. The Episcopal Conference of Peru also joined to express its condemnation.

== See also ==
- Hatun Asha ambush, a Shining Path attack on the military in the province of Huancayo during the 2016 general election
