= Inkarri Islam =

Ethnocacerist group promoting Shia Islam in Peru

- Centro Islámico en el Perú
- Formation: 2012; 14 years ago
- Founder: Edwar Quiroga Vargas
- Purpose: Promoting Islam in Peru from Andean cosmology
- Headquarters: Peru

Inkarri Islam, officially the Islamic Center in Peru (Spanish: Centro Islámico en el Perú), is a nonprofit organization located in the Department of Apurímac. It works to unify Andean culture with Islam.

== History ==
The organization was founded by Edwar Quiroga Vargas in 2012, as an Andean Indigenous rights organizations. Vargas is a Shia convert, and a self-described Ethnocacerist. The organization was accused of inciting social protests in the High Andean Region of Peru. The organization participated in protests in 2019 against the Las Bambas copper mine. Regarding the Tia Maria mine, the organization released a statement on 6 August 2021, stating:

When Toledo was president, the Jews imposed power on PPK. He negotiated with Xstrata Cooper to sell Las Bambas, and then they resold it... Here we call for the civic-military unity to defend the homeland, this great unity of Peru and the Tahuantinsuyo... It's time for the military and civilians of the organized people to unite.

— Edwar Quiroga Vargas

In the 2021 Peruvian general election, Inkarri Islam endorsed Pedro Castillo.

== Religious synthesis ==
Dardo Lopez-Dolz, former vice minister of the Ministry of the Interior, suggested that the Twelver Shia belief of the Reappearance of Muhammad al-Mahdi mirrors the myth of the Inkarri.

== Criticism ==
The organization has been criticized for its alleged ties to remnants of the Shining Path, and alleged ties and sympathies to Hezbollah and the Islamic Republic of Iran.

Lopez-Dolz, in testimony to the United States House Foreign Affairs Subcommittee on the Middle East and North Africa, alleged that Vargas maintained ties to Shining Path through convicted drug trafficker Guillermo Bermejo Rios.

Lopez-Dolz also stated that "The cultural similarity previously mentioned between the Shiite worldview and the southern Andean world could, given funding and sufficient dedication, generate a rapid expansion of Hezbollah cells with effects that are hard to predict," and that "Iran is recruiting and using clandestine entry into Peru, constructing networks with a growing capability for action in the southern Andean region". Dolz implied that Vargas is connected to rumors within the Shia community of Peru "concerning the disappearance of a $40,000 grant awarded by Iran for the construction of a mosque, which was never built." The Counter Extremism Project reported connections between Vargas and Hezbollah-linked individuals.

== See also ==
- Edwar Quiroga Vargas
- Islam in Peru
- Inkarri
