= Martha Huatay =

Peruvian terrorist (1943–2022)

- Born: 1943; Trujillo, Peru
- Died: 2022; Buenos Aires, Argentina
- Other name: Comrade Rosa
- Organization: Shining Path
- Criminal charges: Terrorism
- Penalty: 25 years

Martha Isabel Huatay Ruiz (Trujillo, 1943 — Buenos Aires, 2022), also known as Comrade Rosa, was a Peruvian lawyer and convicted terrorist who served as a member of the Shining Path's logistical and political wing. She was sentenced to 25 years in prison over her affiliation with the group, being released in 2017.

In 2022 Huatay left Lima for Buenos Aires amid preparations for a trial regarding her involvement in the 1992 Tarata bombing.

== See also ==
- Peter Cárdenas Schulte, former MRTA member who left Peru for Sweden after his release from prison.
