= 5th Army Division =

Division of the Peruvian Army

- V División de Ejército
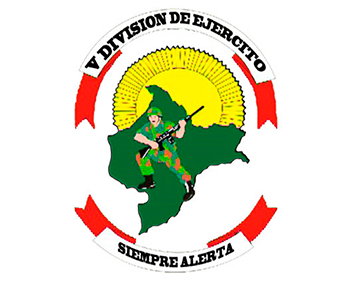
- Country: Peru
- Branch: Peruvian Army
- Size: Division
- Garrison: Iquitos
- Nickname: V DE
- Motto: Siempre alerta
- Engagements: Ecuadorian–Peruvian territorial dispute: Ecuadorian–Peruvian War; Battle of Rocafuerte; Colombian–Peruvian Border War

Commanders
- Current commander: Oswaldo Calle Talledo

The 5th Army Division (Spanish: V División de Ejército) is a infantry division unit of the Peruvian Army (EP) that specialized in combat patrol in mountain forest terrain, combined arms, counterinsurgency, jungle warfare, and military logistics.

== History ==
The unit was first created on 27 June 1961, with the name 5th Military Region (Spanish: V Región Militar). On 31 December 2002 the region was disestablished and reestablished as the Oriental Military Region (Spanish: Región Militar del Oriente), changing to its current name in 2013. The unit saw combat during the Ecuadorian–Peruvian War as part of the Northern Army Detachment in its northeastern offensive.

The unit's emblem features an outline of the Peruvian department of Loreto, a Sun and a Peruvian soldier.

== Organization ==
The 5th Army Division is formed by the following units:

- 5th Services Brigade
- 35th Jungle Brigade

== See also ==
- 1st Army Division
- 2nd Army Division
- 3rd Army Division
- 4th Army Division
- Battle of Rocafuerte
