= 1st Army Division (Peru) =

Division of the Peruvian Army

- I División de Ejército
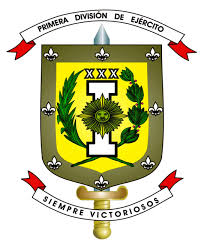
- Country: Peru
- Branch: Peruvian Army
- Size: Division
- Garrison: Piura
- Nickname: I DE
- Motto: Siempre victoriosos (Note: A longer version, meant to be a call and response chant, is as follows: I División de Ejército: "Invencible" Como en el año 41: "Victoria" Como en el año 81: "Victoria" Como en el año 95: "Victoria" Sus fronteras: "Intocables" Todo el norte: "Protegido" Viva el Perú: ¡Viva!)
- Engagements: Ecuadorian–Peruvian Border War: 1941 Ecuadorian–Peruvian War; Battle of Zarumilla; Paquisha War; Cenepa War; Expropriation of La Brea y Pariñas

Commanders
- Current commander: Orestes Vargas Ortiz
- Notable commanders: Eloy Ureta

The 1st Army Division (Spanish: I División de Ejército), formerly the Northern Army Detachment (Spanish: Agrupamiento del Norte), is a combined infantry division unit of the Peruvian Army (EP) that specialized in combat patrol in mountain forest terrain, combined arms, counterinsurgency, jungle warfare, and maneuver warfare.

== History ==
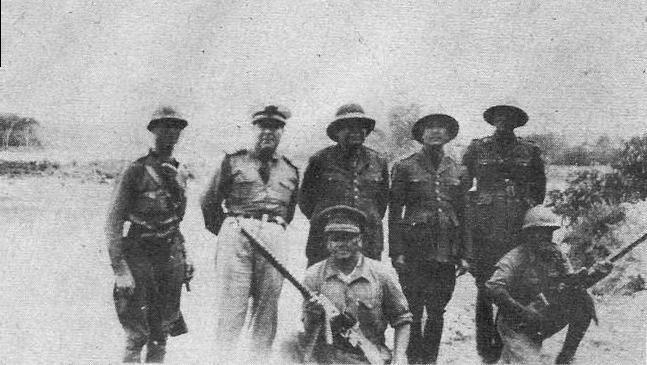
General Ureta and members of the Northern Army Detachment in 1941.

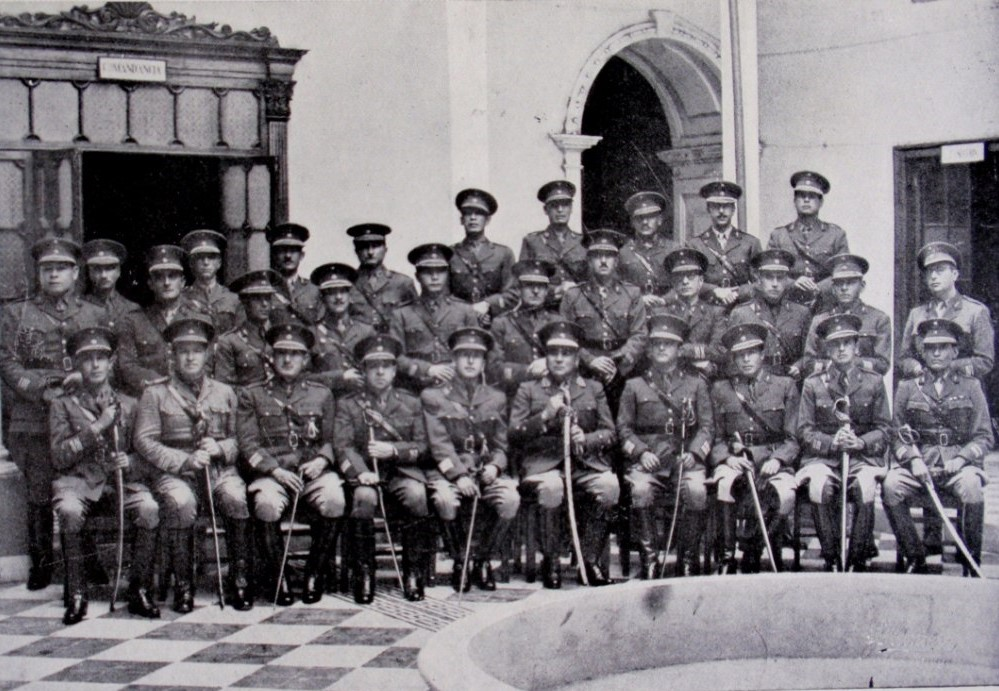
Generals of the Northern Army Detachment in 1941.

First founded as a Region, its headquarters were relocated by Luis Miguel Sánchez Cerro's administration from Lambayeque to Piura in 1930. It was then reorganized under Manuel Prado's administration and renamed as the Northern Army Detachment (Spanish: Agrupamiento del Norte) in January 1941, under the command of then General Eloy Ureta. After hostilities broke out with Ecuador on July of the same year, the division took on a major role during the conflict, carrying out an offensive on the Ecuadorian coast.

In the 1960s, the unit was again renamed to the 1st Military Region, and again in 2003 as the Northern Military Region. In 2012, by Legislative Decree No. 1137 “Peruvian Army Law”, the military regions again became army divisions. As a result, the unit's name was again changed to its current one.

The division's coat of arms features a Sun of May and other features that represent certain elements of the division.

== Organization ==
The 1st Army Division is formed by the following units:

- 1st Infantry Brigade
- 1st Cavalry Brigade
- Artillery Group Crl. José Joaquín Inclán
- 6th Jungle Brigade
- 7th Infantry Brigade
- 32nd Infantry Brigade
- 9th Armored Brigade
- 1st Services Brigade

== See also ==
- 2nd Army Division
- 3rd Army Division
- 4th Army Division
- 5th Army Division
