= Peruvian Army =

Land warfare branch of Peru's armed forces

- Ejército del Perú
- Founded: 18 August 1821
- Country: Peru
- Type: Army
- Size: 92,500 (2021) active
- Motto: Hasta quemar el último cartucho (English: "Until the last cartridge has been fired")
- Colors: Red and white
- March: "Himno del Ejército del Perú"
- Anniversaries: December 9, Army Day; June 7, Battle of Arica and National Flag Day
- Engagements: See list: Wars of Independence; War in Peru; 1st Iquicha War; War in Ecuador; War in Bolivia; Territorial disputes of Peru; Conflict with Bolivia; War of 1828; War of 1841–1842; Angulo Expedition; Hercelles Expedition; Manuripi conflict; Conflict with Brazil; Conflict with Colombia; War of 1828–1829; Conflict of 1911; War of 1932–1933; Conflict with Ecuador; War of 1857–1860; Conflict of 1903; Conflict of 1904; War of 1941; Cenepa incident; Paquisha War; Cenepa War; Conflict with Spain; Peruvian Civil Wars; War of 1834; War of 1835–1836; War of 1836–1839; 2nd Iquicha War; War of 1843–1844; War of 1856–1858; War of 1884–1885; War of 1894–1895; Insurrection of 1896; Insurrection of 1932; War of 1980–2000; War of the Pacific
- Website: https://www.gob.pe/ejercito

Commanders
- Commander-in-chief: President Keiko Fujimori
- Minister of Defence: Cesar peche
- Chief of the Joint Command: Army General Manuel Gómez de la Torre
- Commanding General of the Army: Army General Walter Córdova Alemán

- Chief of the General Staff of the Army: Divisional general David Ojeda Parra
- Notable commanders: José de San Martín (founding Commanding General); José de La Mar; Agustín Gamarra; Ramón Castilla; Francisco Bolognesi; Andrés Avelino Cáceres; Eloy Gaspar Ureta

Insignia
- Flag

The Peruvian Army (Spanish: Ejército del Perú, abbreviated EP) is the branch of the Peruvian Armed Forces tasked with safeguarding the independence, sovereignty and integrity of national territory on land through military force. Additional missions include assistance in safeguarding internal security, conducting disaster relief operations and participating in international peacekeeping operations. It celebrates the anniversary of the Battle of Ayacucho (1824) on December 9.

== History ==
Military traditions in Peruvian territory go back to prehispanic times, ranging from small armed bands to the large armies assembled by the Inca Empire. After the Spanish conquest, small garrisons were kept at strategic locations but no standing army existed until the Bourbon reforms of the 18th century. The main purpose of this force was the defense of the Viceroyalty from pirates and corsairs as well as internal rebellions.

=== Independence ===
The Ejército del Perú was officially established on August 18, 1821, when the government of general José de San Martín established the Legión Peruana de la Guardia (Peruvian Guard Legion), although some militia units had been formed before. Peruvian troops were key participants in the final campaign against Spanish rule in South America, under the leadership of general Simón Bolívar, which ended victoriously in the battles of Junín and Ayacucho in 1824.

=== 19th century ===
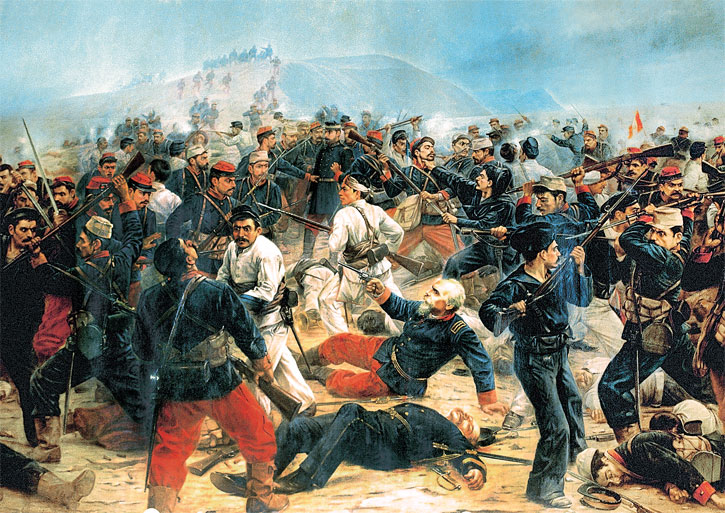
Battle of Arica, July 7, 1880. Painting by Juan Lepiani

After the War of Independence the strong position of the Army and the lack of solid political institutions meant that every Peruvian president until 1872 held some military rank. The Ejército del Perú also had a major role in the definition of national borders by participating in several wars against neighbor countries. This included a conflict against Gran Colombia (1828-1829) where naval victories were obtained and the blockade of Guayaquil but had setbacks in Tarqui, after that an armistice is signed where it is indicated that it remains in statu quo, the Great Colombia dissolves months later product of the war with Peru, the wars of the Peru-Bolivian Confederation (1836-1839), two military invasions to Bolivia and the subsequent expulsion of Bolivian troops from Peruvian soil (1828 and 1841) and a successful occupation of Ecuador (1858-1860). Starting in 1842, increased state revenues from guano. Exports allowed the expansion and modernization of the Army, as well as the consolidation of its political power. These improvements were an important factor in the defeat of a Spanish naval expedition at the Battle of Callao (1866). However, continuous overspending and a growing public debt led to a chronic fiscal crisis in the 1870s which severely affected defense budgets. The consequent lack of military preparedness combined with bad leadership were major causes of Peru's defeat against Chile in the War of the Pacific (1879–1883). The reconstruction of the Army started slowly after the war due to a general lack of funds. A major turning point in this process was the arrival in 1896 of a French Military Mission contracted by president Nicolás de Piérola. By 1900 the peacetime strength of the army was evaluated at six infantry battalions (nearly 2,000 soldiers), two regiments and four squadrons and cavalry (between six and seven hundred soldiers), and one artillery regiment (just over 500 soldiers) for a total of 3,075 personnel. A military school was reportedly operating in the Chorrillos District of Lima and French officers were continuing to assist in the army's reorganization.

=== 20th century ===
During the early years of the 20th century the Peruvian Army underwent a series of reforms under the guidance of the French Military Mission which operated in the periods 1896–1914, 1919–1924 and 1932–1939. Changes included the streamlining of the General Staff, the establishment of the Escuela Superior de Guerra (War College) in 1904, the creation of four military regions (North, Center, South and Orient) in 1905 and a general professionalization of the military career. Improvements such as these were fundamental for the good performance of the Army in the border skirmishes with Colombia (Colombian troops are expelled from the territory of La Pedrera in 1911 and the Peruvian Colombian war in 1933) and a victorious war against Ecuador (1941).

Even though the Peruvian Army was not involved in World War II, this conflict had a significant effect in its development, mainly through the replacement of French military influence by that of the United States. A US military mission started operations in 1945 followed by an influx of surplus American military equipment delivered as military aid or sold at a very low cost.

Washington also established itself as the leader of continental defense through the creation of the Inter-American Defense Board in 1942 and the signing of the Inter-American Treaty of Reciprocal Assistance in 1947. A parallel development was the founding in 1950 of the Centro de Altos Estudios Militares (CAEM, Center of High Military Studies) for the formation of officers in the major problems of the nation beyond those related to its military defense.

The Peruvian Army was the main protagonist of the Gobierno Revolucionario de las Fuerzas Armadas (Revolutionary Government of the Armed Forces), an institutionalized military government that ruled the country between 1968 and 1980. During this period, defense expenditures underwent exponential growth allowing a rapid expansion of the Armed Forces and an unprecedented level of weapon acquisitions. In the early 1970s, US influence over the Army was replaced by a massive influx of Soviet training and equipment, including T-55 tanks, the BM-21 Grad, AK series rifles and the BTR series APCs plus a new Soviet-styled national military strategy of regaining the lost southern provinces which were now part of Chile. Political power returned to the civilians in the 1980s, but the rise of the terrorist insurgent group Sendero Luminoso (Shining Path) prompted the deployment of several Army units in a counter-insurgency role. Human rights violations associated with this intervention and a sharp decrease in the defense budget due to a general economic crisis caused serious problems for the Army morale and readiness as well as a strain on civil-military relations.

In 1981 during the government of Belaúnde Terry, the Paquisha war broke out where 3 infiltrated bases from Ecuador were detected in Peruvian territory on the source of the Comaina River, ending with the eviction and bombardment of Ecuadorian bases.

The presidency of Alberto Fujimori (1990–2000) saw the Army regain protagonism in the public scene, but its increased political power led to some cases of corruption. The internal conflict ceased for the most part after the capture in 1992 of Abimael Guzmán, leader of the terrorist group Shining Path, but a brief border war with Ecuador broke out in 1995. During this period, women were incorporated into the Army first as conscripts in 1993 and then as officers in 1997. Army commandos had an important participation in operation Chavín de Huantar which put an end to the Japanese embassy hostage crisis. In 1999, one year after the signing of a peace treaty with Ecuador conscription was abolished and replaced by a voluntary military service for both genders.

=== 21st century ===
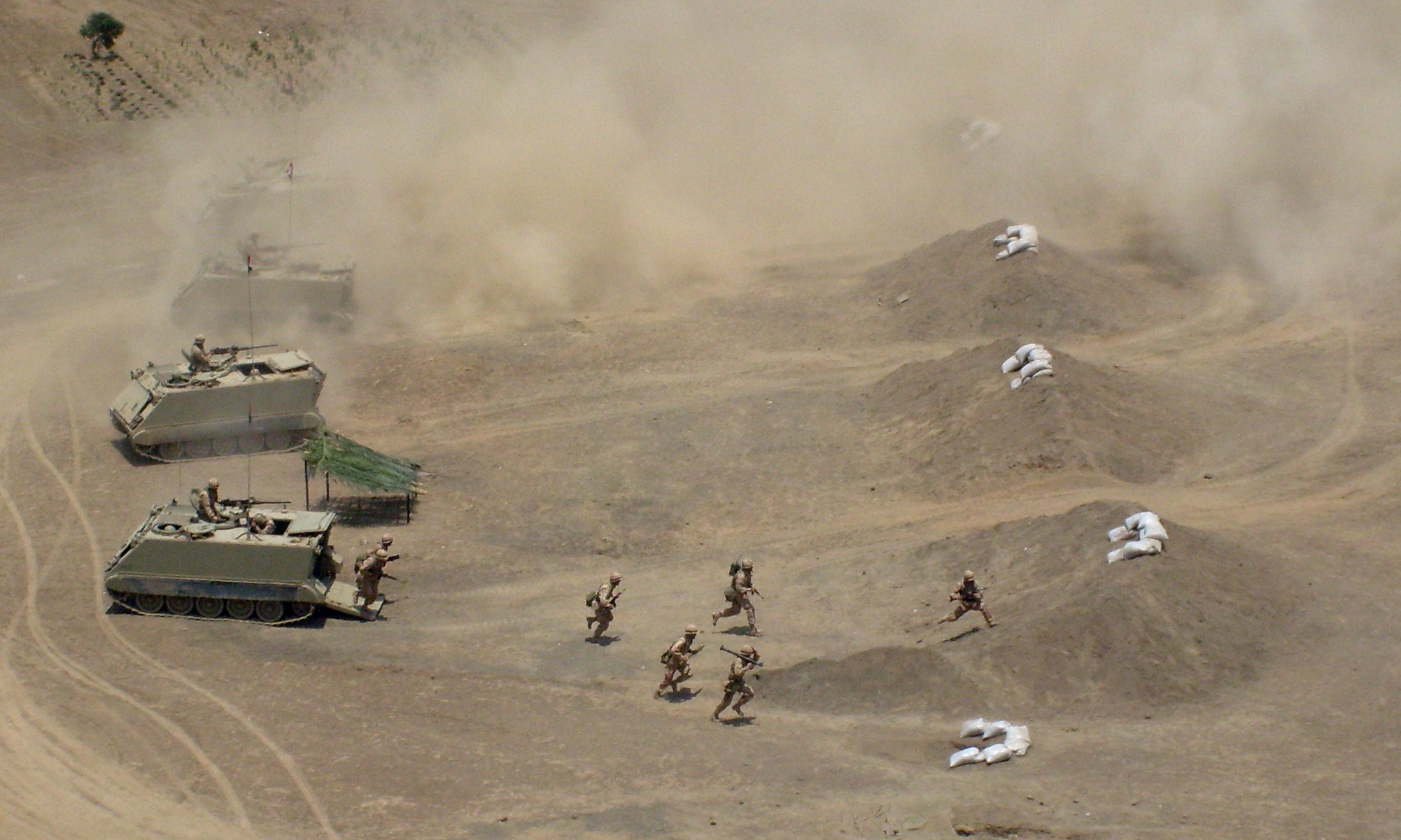
Peruvian Infantry disembarking from Infantry Fighting Vehicles in the Cruz de Hueso Exercise, 2007

The downfall of the Alberto Fujimori regime left the Peruvian Army in a difficult state, with some of its senior officers compromised in scandals of corruption and human rights violations. Several reforms were undertaken during the presidencies of Valentín Paniagua (2000–2001) and Alejandro Toledo (2001–2006), among them the prosecution of criminal cases related to the military, the reorganization of the military rank system and an increased civilian supervision through a revamped Ministry of Defense. The outcome of this and other initiatives is a major factor of order, major preparation, new equipment and development of the Ejército del Perú. G-3 America (G3 and Associates International Corporation) facilitated the incorporation of new technology to eliminate or reduce terrorism. They have been working tenaciously in getting the right equipment for the Armed Forces while working with the US State Department and US companies to accomplish it.

The Ollanta Humalla administration has also had the Army engaged in training members of Peru's indigenous peoples for the duties of national defense as well as, through the BECA 18 program, helping to reduce poverty while teaching the youth of the values of national service. His term also saw the revival of the Army's modernization process with the arrival of the Type 81 MRL, pushing its BM-21s into retirement.

The Peruvian Ministry of Defence has awarded a US$67 million contract to General Dynamics Land Systems-Canada for 32 Light Armoured Vehicles (LAVs) for the Peruvian Marines. The contract was signed through the Canadian Commercial Corporation, a Crown corporation of the Government of Canada. In 2016, the Defense Security Cooperation Agency of the United States made a determination to approve a possible Foreign Military Sale to Peru of 178 reconditioned Stryker infantry carrier vehicles. In 2023, amidst the 2022 Russian invasion of Ukraine, the United States was reported to be pushing Central and South American countries with large quantities of Russian equipment to provide them to Ukraine, by either donating them or exchanging them for U.S. military equipment. Analysts report that Peru is a likely candidate, due to their large quantities of Russian equipment.

== Organization ==
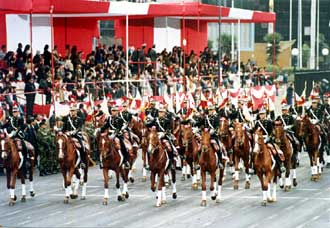
Cavalry Regiment of the Chorrillos Military School.

The current Commanding General of the Peruvian Army is General Oswaldo Martín Calle Talledo. Land forces are subordinated to the Ministry of Defense and ultimately to the President as Commander-in-Chief of the Armed Forces. They are organized as follows:

- Comandancia General del Ejército (Army General Command)
- Estado Mayor General del Ejército (Army General Staff)
- Inspectoría General del Ejército (Army General Inspectorate)
- Secretaría General del Ejército (Army General Secretariat)

Operational units are assigned to one of the following military regions, which are directly subordinate to the Army General Command through the Ground Operations Command.

=== 1st Army Division ===
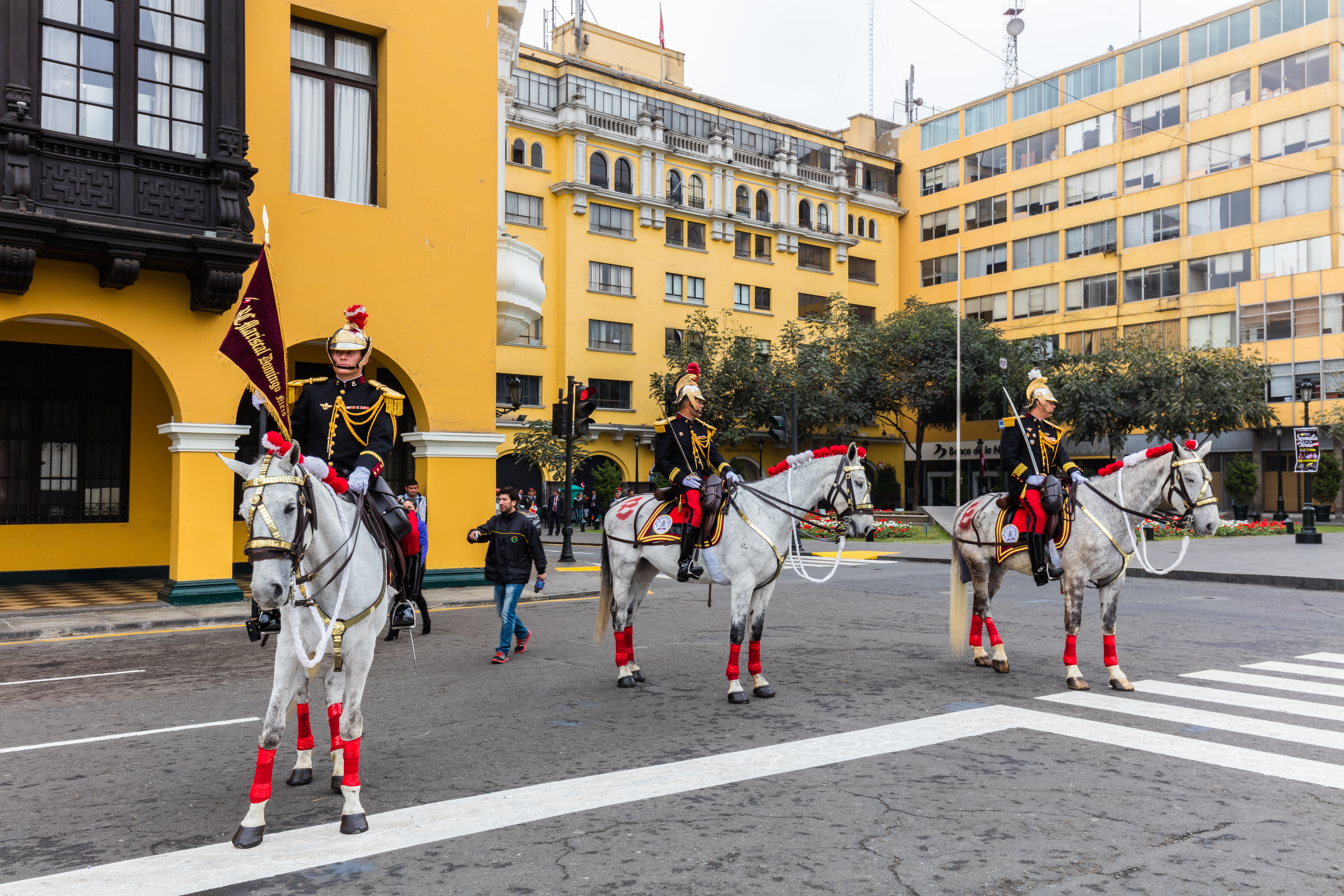
Peruvian cavalry at the Plaza de Armas - Lima, Peru.

North Military Region and 1st Division, formerly known as the Northern Army Detachment. Headquartered at Piura.

- 1st Cavalry Brigade (Sullana)
- 1st Infantry Brigade (Tumbes)
- 7th Infantry Brigade (Lambayeque)
- 32nd Infantry Brigade (Trujillo)
- 6th Jungle Brigade (El Milagro)
- 9th Armored Brigade

=== 2nd Army Division ===
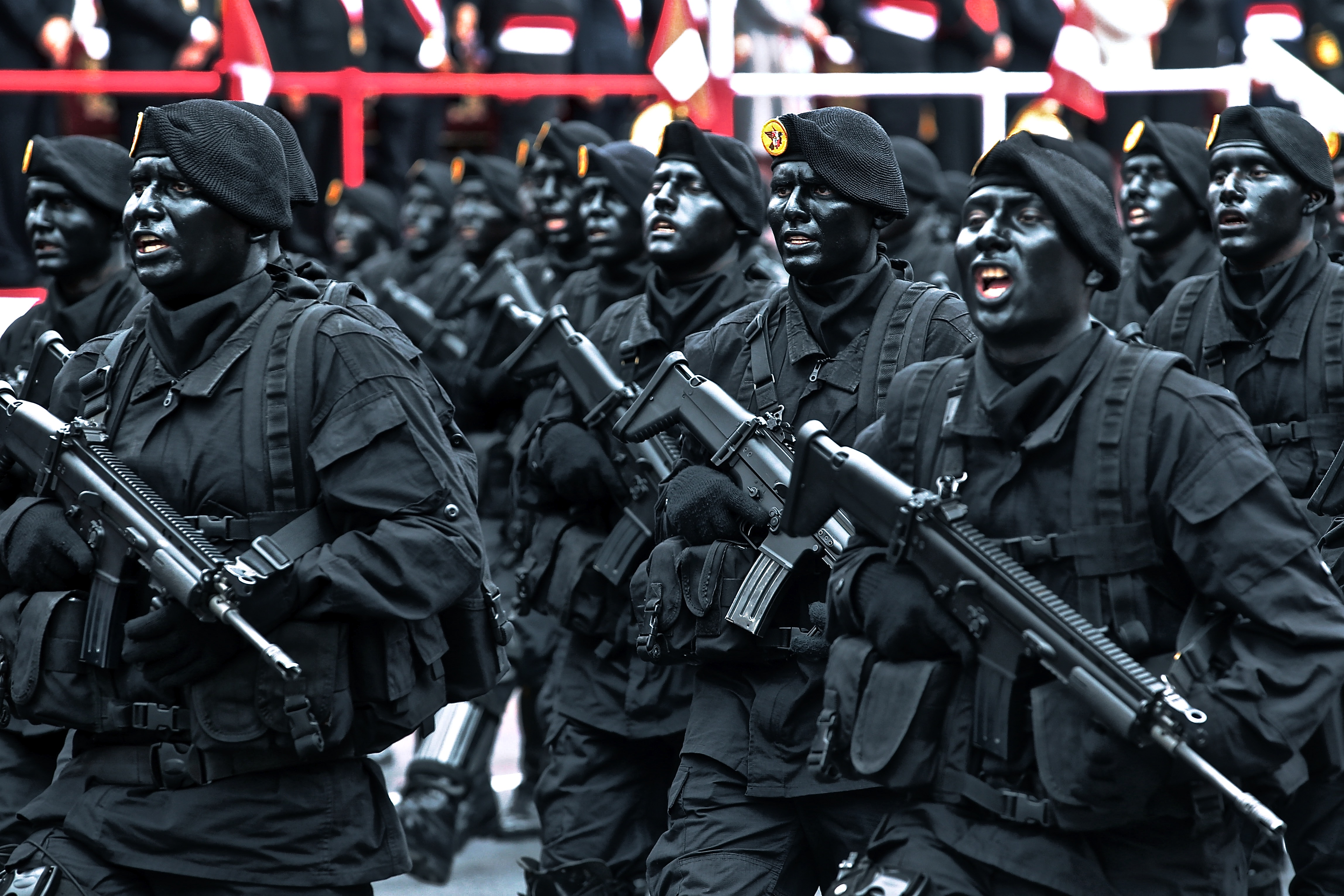
Peruvian Special Forces marching in 2016.

Central/North Central Military Region and 2nd Division, headquartered at Lima.

- 18th Armored Brigade (Lima)
- 2nd Infantry Brigade (Ayacucho)
- 1st Special Forces Brigade (Lima)
- 3rd Special Forces Brigade (Tarapoto)
- 1st Army Aviation Brigade (Callao)
- "Mariscal Domingo Nieto" Cavalry Regiment Escort (Lima)
- Guard Brigade of the Army "Peruvian Guard Legion" (Lima)
  - 1st Mechanized Cavalry Regiment "Hussars of Junín" (Lima)
  - 1st Mechanized Infantry Battalion Peruvian Legion of the Guard
  - 1st Artillery Battery (Separate)
- 1st Combined Arms Brigade
- 21st Infantry Brigade (Reserve)

=== 3rd Army Division ===
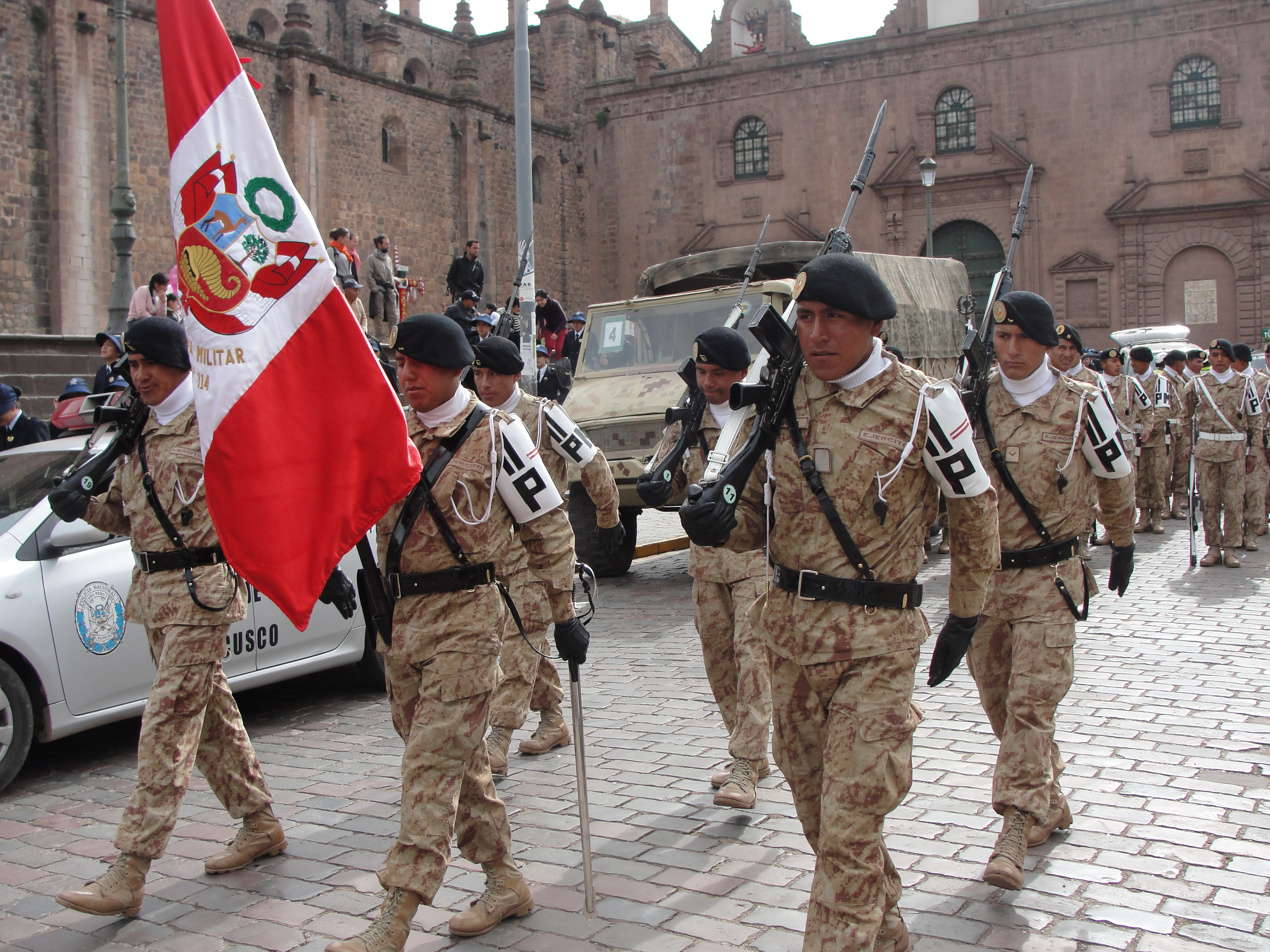
Peruvian Army March – Cusco, Peru

South Military Region and 3rd division, headquartered at Arequipa.

- 3rd Armored Brigade (Moquegua)
- 6th Armored Brigade
- 3rd Cavalry Brigade (Tacna)
- 4th Mountain Brigade (Puno)
- 5th Mountain Brigade (Cuzco)
- 6th Special Forces Brigade
- 3rd Divisional Communications Brigade
- 3rd Divisional Air Defense Artillery

=== 4th Army Division ===
4th (South Central) Military Region and Division.

- 2nd Infantry Brigade
- 31st Infantry Brigade
- 32nd Engineering Brigade
- 33rd Infantry Brigade

=== 5th Army Division ===
Eastern Military Region and 5th Division, headquartered at Iquitos.

- 5th Jungle Brigade (Iquitos)
- 35th Jungle Brigade
- 115th Logistics Brigade

== Personnel ==
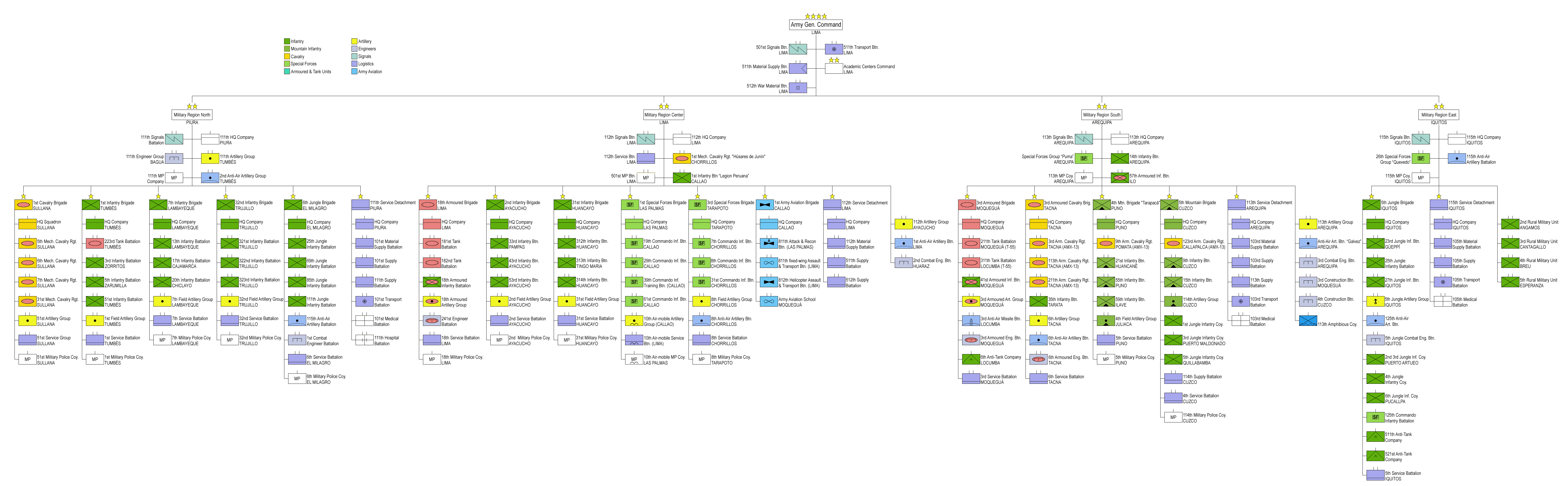
Order of battle (click to enlarge)

Personnel (as of 2001)
Commissioned Officers	6,231
Non-commissioned officers	13,586
Cadets	1,090
NCO in training	1,000
Enlisted	54,321
Civilians	11,480
Total	76,228 (excl. civilians)

== Ranks ==
- Ranks of the officers, sub-officers and others enlisted of the Army.

Officers

Rank group	General / flag officers				Senior officers			Junior officers
Peruvian Army
Peruvian Army	Gran Mariscal del Perú	General de ejército	General de división	General de brigada	Coronel	Teniente coronel	Mayor	Capitán	Teniente	Subteniente

Enlisted

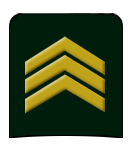
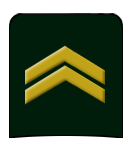
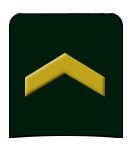
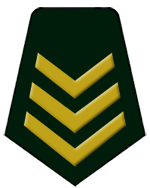
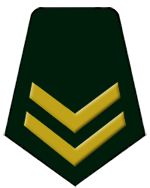
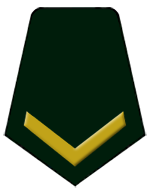
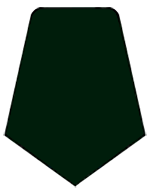
Rank group	Senior NCOs					Junior NCOs	Enlisted
Peruvian Army
Peruvian Army	Suboficial primero	Suboficial segundo	Suboficial tercero	Sargento primero	Sargento segundo	Cabo	Soldado

== Heroes and Patrons ==
- Patron of the Army: Francisco Bolognesi Cervantes
- Patron of the Infantry branch: Andrés A. Cáceres Dorregaray
- Patron of the Cavalry branch: Ramón Castilla y Marquezado
- Patron of the Artillery branch: José Joaquín Inclán Gonzáles Vigil
- Patron of the Engineering branch: Pedro Ruiz Gallo
- Patron of the Communications branch: José Olaya
- Patron of the Legal Service: Mariano Melgar
- Patron of the Health Service: José Casimiro Ulloa Bucello
- Patron of the War Material Service: Leoncio Prado Gutiérrez
- Patron of the Intendancy Service: Pedro Muñiz Sevilla

== Anthem of the Army ==
Spanish lyrics

El ejército unido a la historia
por fecunda y viril tradición,
se corona con lauros de gloria
al forjar una libre nación.
El ejército unido a la historia
por fecunda y viril tradición,
se corona con lauros de gloria
al forjar una libre nación.

Se corona con lauros de gloria
al forjar una libre nación.

Evocando un pasado glorioso
del Incario su antiguo esplendor,
Ayacucho, Junín, Dos de Mayo
libertad conquistó con valor.

Zarumilla, La Breña y Arica
gestas son que a la historia legó
Bolognesi ¡oh, sublime soldado!
por patrono ejemplar te aclamó.

El ejército unido a la historia
por fecunda y viril tradición,
se corona con lauros de gloria
al forjar una libre nación.
El ejército unido a la historia
por fecunda y viril tradición,
se corona con lauros de gloria
al forjar una libre nación.

Se corona con lauros de gloria
al forjar una libre nación.

Las fronteras altivo defiende
cual guardián del honor nacional
de su pueblo recibe las armas
y es bastión de justicia social.

Soy soldado que en filas milito
y un deber tengo yo que cumplir,
a la patria vivir consagrado
y por ella luchar a morir.

El ejército unido a la historia
por fecunda y viril tradición,
se corona con lauros de gloria
al forjar una libre nación.
El ejército unido a la historia
por fecunda y viril tradición,
se corona con lauros de gloria
al forjar una libre nación.

Se corona con lauros de gloria
al forjar una libre nación.

English translation

The army united to history
by a fecund and virile tradition,
is being crowned with laurels of glory
by forging a free nation.
The army united to history
by a fecund and virile tradition,
is being crowned with laurels of glory
by forging a free nation.

Is being crowned with laurels of glory
by forging a free nation.

Evoking a glorious past
from the Incas its ancient splendor,
Ayacucho, Junín, Dos de Mayo
liberty conquered with bravery.

Zarumilla, La Breña and Arica
The heroic deeds are bequeathed to history
By Bolognesi, oh, sublime soldier!
As exemplary patron, you're acclaimed.

The army united to history
by a fecund and virile tradition,
is being crowned with laurels of glory
by forging a free nation.
The army united to history
by a fecund and virile tradition,
is being crowned with laurels of glory
by forging a free nation.

Is being crowned with laurels of glory
by forging a free nation.

The borders he proudly defends
like a guardian of national honor
from his people receives the arms
and is bastion of social justice.

I am soldier who in these militate ranks
and a duty I have to fulfill,
to the Fatherland I shall live consecrated
and for it I will fight to the death.

The army united to history
by a fecund and virile tradition,
is being crowned with laurels of glory
by forging a free nation.
The army united to history
by a fecund and virile tradition,
is being crowned with laurels of glory
by forging a free nation.

Is being crowned with laurels of glory
by forging a free nation.

== See also ==
- Cenepa War
- Ecuadorian–Peruvian War
- Inca army
- Paquisha War
- War of the Pacific

== Sources ==
- (in Spanish) Basadre, Jorge, Historia de la República del Perú. Editorial Universitaria, 1983.
- (in Spanish) Cobas, Efraín, Las Fuerzas Armadas Peruanas en el Siglo XXI. CESLA, 2003.
- Cruz, César, "Latin America Air Forces Survey – Peru". Air Forces Monthly 220: 77–78 (July 2006).
- International Institute for Strategic Studies, The Military Balance 2000–2001. IISS, 2000.
- (in Spanish) Mejía, Lewis and César Cruz, "La Aviación del Ejército del Perú".
  Defensa 290: 42–48 (June 2002).
- (in Spanish) Ministerio de Defensa del Perú, Libro blanco de la defensa nacional.
- (in Spanish) Rial, Juan, Los militares tras el fin del régimen de Fujimori-Montesinos.
  https://web.archive.org/web/20070927210407/http://www.resdal.org/art-rial.htm
- (in Spanish) Tecnología Militar, N°1/2006 ISSN 0722-2904
- (in Spanish) Marchessini, Alejo, "Plan Bolognesi: Actualidad y Futuro del Ejército del Peru". Defensa 347 (March 2007).
- Aircraft information files Brightstar publishing File 344 sheet 4
