= Llochegua Clashes =

Series of armed confrontations on July 21, 2017 in Peru

Battle of Llocheuga (2017)
- Part of Peruvian conflict
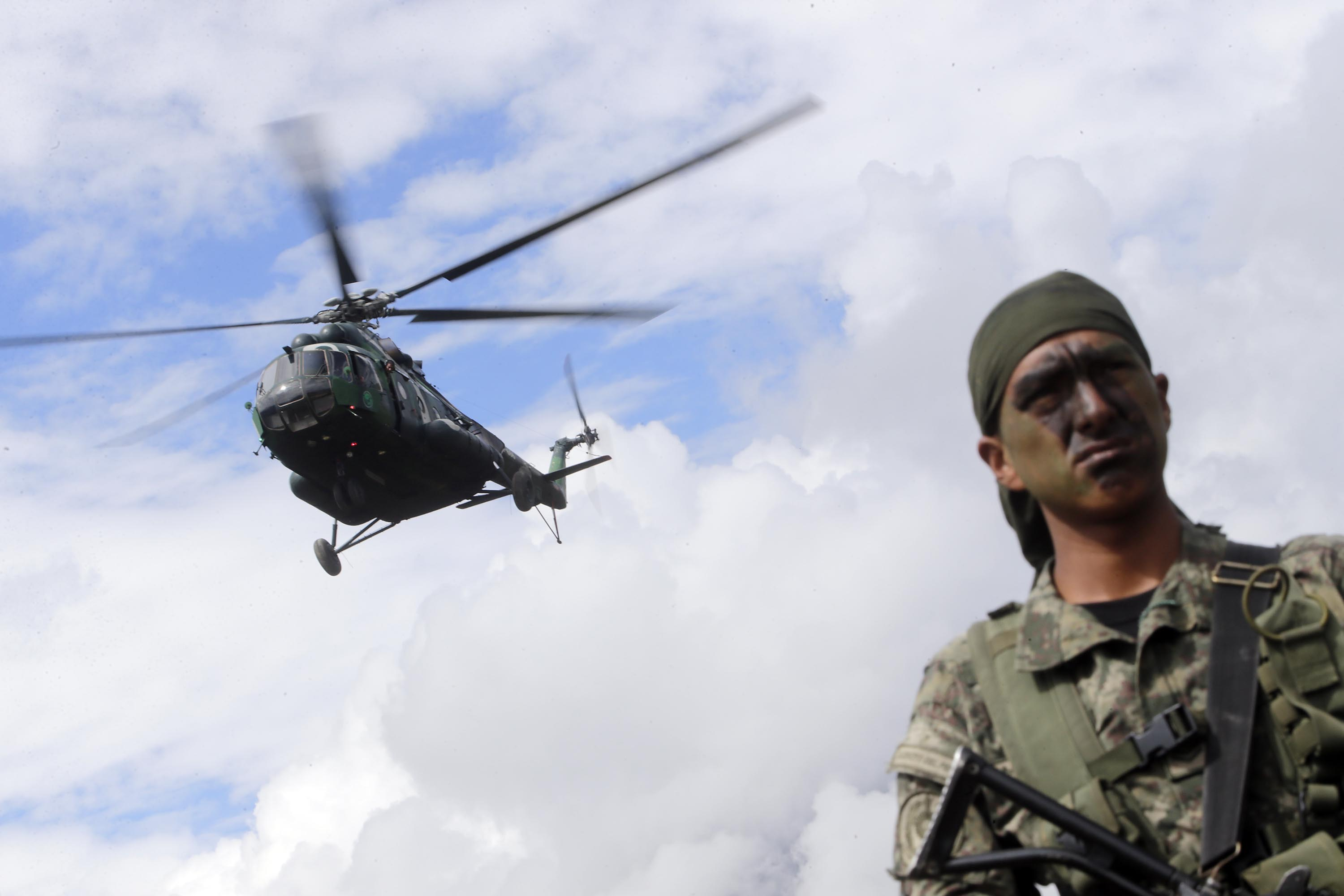
- VRAEM Special Command Operatives, seen in 2012. They would later be involved in the clashes.
Date	17 July 2017
Location	Llochegua District, Peru
Result	Peruvian government victory: Narcoterrorists failed to rescue Ali Cueva Rojas

Belligerents
Peru: Peruvian Armed Forces; Peruvian Police	Narcoterrorists; La Gran Grifa

Commanders and leaders
Daniel Sánchez Pacheco (WIA)	Ali Cueva Rojas (surrendered)

Units involved
1 patrol car 1 helicopter	

Casualties and losses
10 injured (9 police officers, 1 prosecutor); 1 police car destroy	30 killed in action 1 captured

The Llochegua Clashes were a series of armed confrontations that took place on the afternoon of Friday, July 21, 2017, in the Peruvian district of Llochegua within the framework of the narcoterrorist insurgency in the VRAEM, the specific location of the attack was in the Los Angeles area, located in the highway that connects the districts of Llochegua and Pichari—when members of the Peruvian National Police were carrying the drug trafficking leader Ali Cueva Rojas. The combat originated as a response by the insurgents to the destruction of their clandestine drug production laboratories. The joint command of the Vraem forces ordered the sending of a helicopter to the conflict area to provide air support to the police forces. The confrontation left nine police officers, as well as a prosecutor, injured, at the same time the drug trafficking leader who was trying to escape was captured again.

== Background ==
In the area known as VRAEM, the President of the Republic Pedro Pablo Kuczynski had incorporated the Peruvian Air Force to take control of the skies as part of a plan that his government implemented in 2016 in the face of growing drug trafficking throughout the country. Given the implementation of the air force, the insurgents were discovered in several areas previously not visible to army and police patrols, resulting in a chain of attacks between both sides, which also included kidnappings and attacks.

== Combat ==
=== Destruction of laboratories ===
Days before, the national police had begun destroying clandestine drug laboratories belonging to drug trafficking groups. One of the objectives of the destruction was to find and capture drug trafficking leaders who usually ally themselves with the remnants of the terrorist group Sendero Luminoso to jointly confront government forces.

=== Capture of Ali Cueva Rojas ===
The Police Front of the Valley of the Apurímac, Ene and Mantaro Rivers had information obtained through the reward program of the Ministry of the Interior that Ali Cueva Rojas, the main leader of the narcoterrorist group La Gran Grifa, was hiding in the town of Periabente (LGG), the command sent to capture him intervened in the town and forcibly captured the leader due to fierce civil resistance. Later, shots were exchanged between the police and the villagers loyal to La Gran Grifa. The police managed to expel the men from the town.

=== Narcoterrorist ambush ===
The police patrol car was heading to the town of Pichari to transport Cueva to the city of Lima. On that journey, passing through the Los Angeles area, the patrol car was ambushed by forces of La Gran Rifa, the police vehicle was shot down, the police They evacuated on the way to a high wooded area that they used as a shield, the attackers besieged the police who did not stop shooting, the latter managed to ask for help from the VRAEM Special Command who sent a helicopter to repel the narcoterrorist offensive.

=== Aftermath ===
The ambush left nine police officers and a prosecutor injured and despite the seriousness of the attack, the narcoterrorists did not achieve their main objective, which was to rescue Ali Cueva Rojas. The wounded and the detainee were sent to Pichari and later to Lima.

=== Casualties ===
The following were injured as a result of the clashes:

- Felipe Sánchez Pacheco
- Durand Cunyas Gutiérrez
- Jairo Florida Palma
- Armando Melgar Pérez
- Luis Llontop Loayza
- Marco Antonio Bassilio Chaupis
- Melgar Pérez
- MexicoFigueroa
- Hidalgo Ramos
- Salazar Bonilla

== See also ==
- Peruvian conflict
