= Hatun Asha ambush =

2016 attacks in Santo Domingo, Peru

Santo Domingo de Acombamba and Llochegua attack
- Part of the Internal conflict in Peru
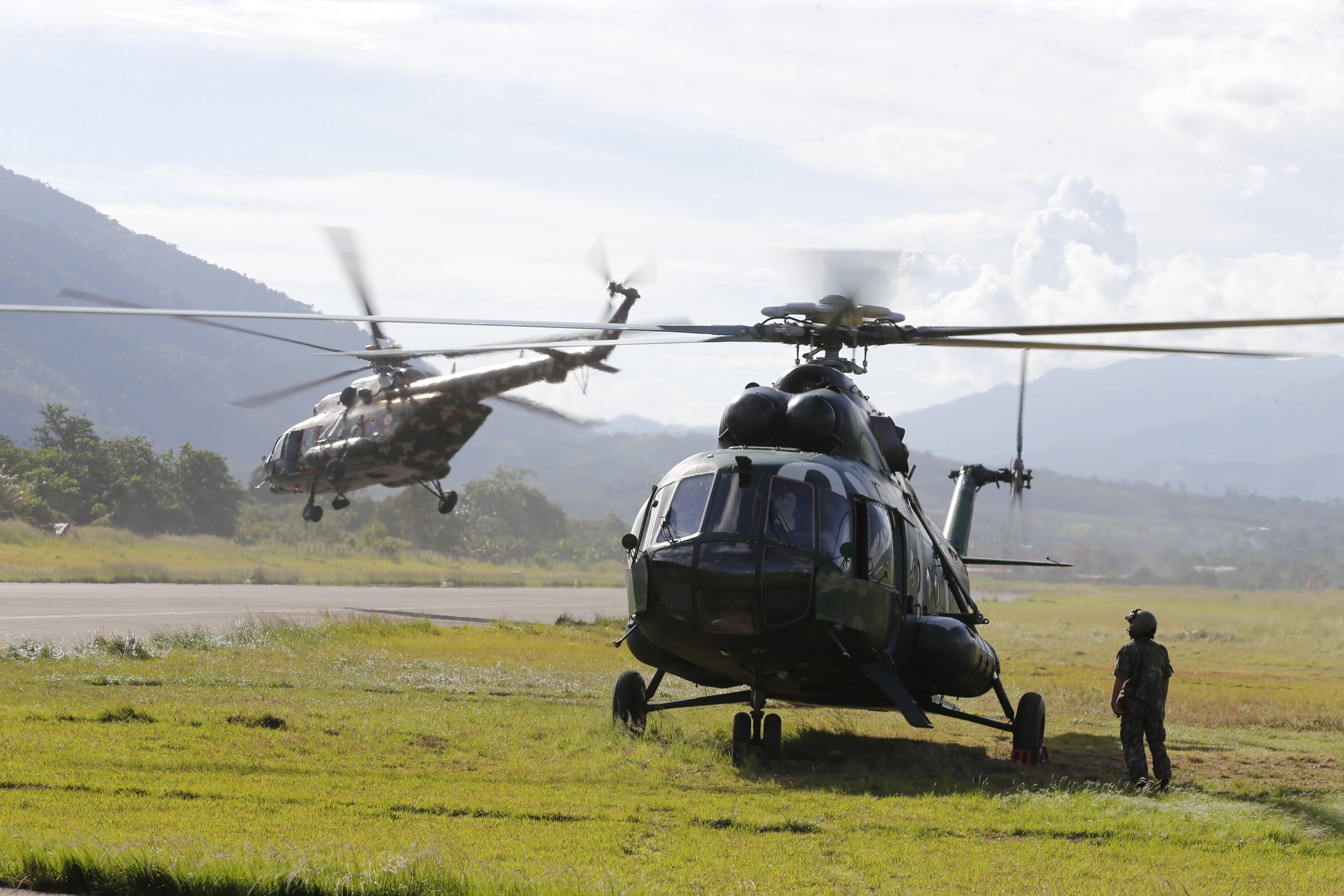
- Peruvian Army helicopters land in the VRAEM Area
- Location: Santo Domingo de Acobamba District, Huancayo; and Llochegua District, Junín Province, Peru
- Date: 10 April 2016 (PET)
- Target: 311th Counterinsurgency Battalion convoy
- Deaths: 9 soldiers 2 civilian contractors
- Injuries: 5 soldiers
- Perpetrators: Shining Path members Jorge "Comrade Raul" Quispe and Abel "Comrade Alejandro" Auqui

2016 attacks in Santo Domingo de Acobamba and Llochegua took place on the eve of the 2016 Peruvian general election, when groups of Shining Path guerrilla fighters armed with long-range rifles and grenades, ambushed a Peruvian military caravan of eight vehicles at Hatun Asha. The ambush began at approximately 5:00 (a.m.), when guerrillas targeted a Peruvian military patrol along a rural road within the Santo Domingo de Acobamba District, located in the District of Huancayo. The vehicles were transporting election ballots and related materials and their transport was handled by soldiers of the 311th Battalion of the Peruvian Armed Forces, who were tasked with guarding polling places in the central Junin region, while the patrol was also to serve in Lima. The ambush left a total of nine government soldiers and two civilian contractors dead as well as five others who escaped wounded. Two hours after the attack, a second attack occurred in Mayapo, on the Llochegua District in Ayacucho, where one police officer was injured and taken to a hospital in Pichari.

The government responded with helicopters being called in to respond to the incident to hunt down the perpetrators, at the same time reassuring that elections would still take place, and that nothing had changed regarding them. The attack was condemned by various figures, including then president Ollanta Humala, and prominent politicians like Pedro Pablo Kuczynski, Alan Garcia, Alejandro Toledo, and Verónika Mendoza. It was also condemned by the Office of the Public Defender and the Organization of American States.

The ambush marked the deadliest Shining Path attack in years and a resurgence of the group to disrupt the Peruvian general elections.
