= Vizcatán del Ene District =

Vizcatán del Ene Distrito de Vizcatán del Ene
- District
- Location in Peru
- Coordinates: 12°11′54″S 74°14′35″W
- Country: Peru
- Region: Junín
- Province: Satipo
- Founded: October 2, 2015
- Capital: Vizcatán del Ene

Government
  - Alcalde: Alejandro Atao Guerreros (Fuerza Popular)

Population (2017 census)
  - Total: 4,765
- Time zone: UTC-5 (PET)
- UBIGEO: 120609

Vizcatán del Ene district is one of the nine constituent districts of Satipo Province situated in the eastern part of the Department of Junín, Peru.

== History ==
The district was founded on 2 October 2015 by the government of President Ollanta Humala by enactment of Law Number 30346.

In May 2021, the San Miguel del Ene attack was perpetrated in the area, resulting in the deaths of 18 people.
