= Rodrigo Franco Command =

Peruvian paramilitary organization

The Rodrigo Franco Command was a paramilitary organization that acted as a death squad in Peru from 1985–1990. The group was closely aligned with the American Popular Revolutionary Alliance (APRA), which governed Peru under Alan García during the years of the Rodrigo Franco Command's existence. The group took its name from Rodrigo Franco Montes, a member of the APRA who was assassinated by Shining Path militants, and was made up of people trained in North Korea.

According to the Truth and Reconciliation Commission, the group committed various human rights violations, including the murder of a human rights lawyer, the murder of a member of the Communist Party of Peru (Red Fatherland), the murder of a member of the Túpac Amaru Revolutionary Movement, and the placement of a car bomb in front of a newspaper's headquarters.

== See also ==
- Grupo Colina
