= Edwar Quiroga Vargas =

Peruvian activist

Personal details
- Born: Joys Edwar Quiroga Vargas; 1 January 1963 (age 63)
- Party: Inkarri Islam
- Other political affiliations: Ethnocacerist Movement (from c. 2010); Kechwa Apurímac Integration Movement (2006–2010)

Edwar Husain Quiroga Vargas (born Joys Edwar Quiroga Vargas, 1 January 1976) is a Peruvian Islamic activist and politician who is the founder of Inkarri Islam, a non-profit organization which aims to unify concepts of Andean culture and the precepts of Islam. Quiroga Vargas has been described as a follower of Marxism–Leninism, who holds sympathies for Hezbollah and the Islamic Republic of Iran.

== Biography ==
Born on 1 January 1976, Quiroga Vargas founded the Kechwa Apurímac Integration Movement and was its leader from 2006 to 2010. He ran as a candidate of the Ethnocacerist Movement for the regional presidency of Apurímac in 2010.

In 2017, he organized the First National Congress for the Decolonization of Peru and Tahuantinsuyo where he made a "call for the union of the social forces committed to seizing and recovering the sovereignty and self-determination of the peoples of Peru and the Tahuantinsuyu" inspired by the "libertarian and decolonizing spirit of Tupac Amaru II". In the Las Bambas protests, he took the lead after the arrest of protest leader Gregorio Rojas. During the protests, he gave a speech calling for a "civic-military union" against "colonizing companies."

During the 2021 Peruvian presidential election, he endorsed the candidacy of Pedro Castillo of Free Peru, whom he considers his "brother in struggle." During a program hosted by Beto Ortíz, audio was played where Quiroga Vargas expressed his intention to carry out "revolutionary process[es]".
