= Hezbollah in Latin America =

- Leader: Hussein Ahmad Karaki (alleged by Argentina)
- Dates active: 1980s–present
- Active regions: Latin America
- Ideology: Shia Islamism
- Part of: Hezbollah

Hezbollah in Latin America (Note: Spanish: Hezbolá en América Latina, Portuguese: Hezbollah na América Latina, Arabic: حزب الله في أمريكا اللاتينية) is a splinter organization of the Shia Islamist Lebanese political party and militant group Hezbollah which operates in Latin America.

== History ==
The group was established in the 1980s in the tri-border region of Paraguay, Brazil and Argentina which was considered a safe haven for the group's operations of smuggling, recruitment, and planning of attacks. They expanded into Venezuela, allegedly with some degree of sponsorship from the Venezuelan state. The establishment was seen by the United States government as a way for Iran to get more leverage against the US and set up a South American terrorist proxy network. The group's "hub" is in Ciudad del Este, Paraguay. Through their establishment in the tri-border countries, members of Hezbollah in Latin America have expanded their operations into areas of Chile and Bolivia. According to Italian political scientist Emanuele Ottolengh of the Foundation for Defense of Democracies (FDD), Hezbollah had an established presence in both of the countries for two decades years as of 2024. Besides the constant funding and revenue building, operations done by Hezbollah in Latin America are mostly minimal when it comes to terrorist attacks and other forms of paramilitary activity in order to keep a low profile.

Hezbollah in Latin America has been suspected of being involved in the 1994 AMIA bombing, in which the Argentine Israelite Mutual Association building in Buenos Aires was destroyed, and 85 people were killed.

In 2017, the United States arrested two suspected members of Hezbollah in Latin America, Samer el Debek and Ali Kourani, who were both Lebanese United States citizens, Samer el Debek who was born in Dearborn, Michigan, was plotting on attack the Israeli embassy with Ali Kourani, Debek received paramilitary training outside the United States in Panama in a training base that was hosted and funded by Hezbollah in Latin America.

=== 2020s ===
In 2021, members of Hezbollah in Latin America were planning on assassinating an Israeli national in Colombia as revenge for the assassination of Qasem Soleimani which was part of a larger operation of revenge attacks by Hezbollah.

In September 2023, the United States Department of State designated Hezbollah in Latin America and other operatives associated with them as terrorists.

After the 2023 October 7 attacks during the Gaza war, Hezbollah has been accused by Israel of planning to carry out terrorist attacks against Jewish and Israeli targets in Brazil.

In November 2023, two men suspected of links to Hezbollah in Latin America and Hezbollah at large were arrested by Brazilian police. One of the men was arrested in the São Paulo/Guarulhos International Airport after coming from Lebanon into Brazil. The plan that the men had was to attack Jewish communities in Brazil, but the plan was foiled with assistance from the Mossad intelligence agency. In addition to these arrests, the Brazilian police executed 11 search warrants in relation to the recruitment of extremists in Brazil. These search warrants included homes and storage facilities in São Paulo, the capital Brazil and all over the state of Minas Gerais.

On December 30, 2023, the United States Department of Justice announced charges against Samuel Salman El Reda, a Lebanese Colombian man which they identified as a member of the Islamic Jihad Organization and Hezbollah in Latin America, including conspiring to provide and providing material support to a designated terrorist organization among other terror-related charges. The DOJ alleged that he helped plan and execute terrorist attacks in the 1990s, including the AIMA bombing

In 2025, the Saudi Al-Hadath Channel reported that 400 field commanders from Hezbollah recently left Lebanon along with their families and relocated to South American countries such as Venezuela, Ecuador, Colombia, and Brazil, citing a source at the Argentine embassy in Lebanon. This move is due to concerns about being monitored as part of the dismantling of Hezbollah’s military infrastructure following the ceasefire agreement with Israel in November.

In 2026, it was reported that Hezbollah was recruiting Brazilian convicted criminals to carry out attacks against Jews and Israelis in Latin America.

==== 2024 allegations by the Argentine government ====
In 2024, Argentine Minister of Security Patricia Bullrich alleged that the leader of Hezbollah in Latin America was Hussein Ahmad Karaki and that he masterminded most attacks by Hezbollah in Latin America, including the 1994 AMIA bombing and 2023 attacks against Jews in Brazil. They asserted that Karaki took direct orders from the then-leader of Hezbollah, Hassan Nasrallah, before his assassination by the Israel Defense Forces. Karaki is currently believed to live in Lebanon. According to the Argentinian government, Venezuelan authorities helped him escape persecution by giving him legal documents in order to get around any arrest warrants.

The government alleged that he had worked alongside mafias such as 'Ndrangheta and Camorra of Italy and the Primeiro Comando da Capital (PCC) of Brazil in order to expand drug smuggling operations and money laundering operations.

== Finances ==
As of 2018, American officials alleged that around one-third of the funds Hezbollah generated came from South America, specifically pointing to the Argentina, Paraguay, and Brazil tri-border area. According to Emanuele Ottolengh of the FDD, they were generating $200 Million from and moving $600M total through the region per year.

Corporate consultant and former Colombian military colonel John Marulanda said in a 2022 interview with The Jerusalem Post that he believes selling illegal goods made up around 60–70% of Hezbollah in Latin America's revenue.

== Opposition ==
Hezbollah was designated as a terrorist group by Argentina in 2019, Paraguay in 2019, Colombia in 2020, Guatemala in 2020, and Honduras in 2020.

United States sanctions have targeted specific suspected members of Hezbollah in Latin America, such as Amer Mohamed Akil Rada whom the US described as “one of the operational members” behind the AMIA bombing. In 2023, the US Treasury sanctioned seven individuals in and businesses related to his family in South America and Lebanon.

== Alleged support ==
=== Cuba ===
In 2011, Italian newspaper Corriere della Sera alleged that Hezbollah militants had established a base in Cuba where it was planning an attack on an Israeli target in retribution for the assassination of Hezbollah's Chief of Staff Imad Mughniyah in 2006 by the CIA and Mossad.

=== Nicaragua ===
In 2012, Israeli media including The Times of Israel alleged that Hezbollah had set up a training camp in northern Nicaragua. Some outlets cited "local media" in Nicaragua, despite no local reporting existing on the alleged camp. Spokesmen for US Southern Command in Florida Jose Ruíz asserted that they had no knowledge of any Hezbollah presence in Nicaragua. Speaking about the allegations, he said that, "[t]his is definitely the first time I have heard of any Iranian presence in Nicaragua of this nature."

In response to the allegations, foreign policy advisor to the President of Nicaragua Miguel d'Escoto said that, "[t]he only ones who train terrorists in this world—that I know of—are the United States in the first place, and in second place the Zionists" and that the claims were "absurd craziness".

=== Russia ===
Some weaponry that Hezbollah in Latin America has used have been traced back to Russian suppliers, but Russia has denied any involvement in the funding of Hezbollah in Latin America, saying that the weapons could have been placed in their hands by accident.

== See also ==
- Ayman Saied Joumaa
