= Santo Domingo de Acobamba District =

Santo Domingo de Acobamba Aqupampa
- District
- Interactive map of Santo Domingo de Acobamba
- Country: Peru
- Region: Junín
- Province: Huancayo
- Founded: September 6, 1920
- Capital: Santo Domingo de Acobamba

Government
  - Mayor: Isaias Felipe Grabel Cano

Area
  - Total: 778.02 km^{2} (300.40 sq mi)
- Elevation: 2,200 m (7,200 ft)

Population (2005 census)
  - Total: 8,157
  - Density: 10.48/km^{2} (27.15/sq mi)
- Time zone: UTC-5 (PET)
- UBIGEO: 120135

Santo Domingo de Acobamba District is one of twenty-eight districts of the province Huancayo in Peru.

== Ethnic groups ==
The people in the district are mainly indigenous citizens of Quechua descent. Quechua is the language which the majority of the population (71.96%) learnt to speak in childhood, 27.47% of the residents started speaking using the Spanish language (2007 Peru Census).
