= Peter Cárdenas Schulte =

Peruvian terrorist (born 1955)

- Born: Peter David Peabody Cárdenas Schulte; May 15, 1955 (age 71); Lima, Peru
- Education: National University of Cordoba
- Military career
- Allegiance: PRP (1974-1976); PSR-ML (1976-1979); MRTA (1982-1992)
- Rank: Commander in Lima
- Known for: Co-founding the MRTA; Heading logistics and finances of the MRTA

Peter David Peabody Cárdenas Schulte, also known as Comrade Alejandro and El Siciliano, is a Peruvian terrorist and former convict known as a co-founder and the second-in-command of the Túpac Amaru Revolutionary Movement (MRTA). Within the MRTA, Schulte served as the head of logistics and finances. Schulte was known as the architect behind the idea of people's prisons.

== Biography ==
Schulte was born on May 15, 1955, in Lima, Peru. He studied at the Carmelitas de Miraflores school in Miraflores District, and intended on becoming a priest. In 1974, Schulte traveled to Argentina to study at the National University of Córdoba. Schulte began taking part in attacks by the People's Revolutionary Army (PRP) between 1974 and 1976, learning guerrilla tactics in the process. After the 1976 Argentine coup d'état by Jorge Rafael Videla, Schulte was arrested twice. The first arrest was at a street protest, and the second was in connection to a murder of a policeman. Due to a lack of evidence, Schulte was released and returned to Peru where he worked at El Tigre chocolate factory in Lima. At El Tigre, Schulte began doing union work and contacted militants within the Revolutionary Socialist Party (PSR), although this failed after new laws instated by the 1968 Peruvian coup d'état.

Schulte then moved to Huancayo, where he worked for an NGO and the local Radio Huancavelica. In Huancayo, Schulte founded a newspaper called Pucutay and served as a delegate of the PSR in the city. He participated in the PSR's congress where the group split and became the Marxist–Leninist Revolutionist Socialist Party (PSR-ML). In 1979, Schulte was contacted by Luis Varese to form the Anti-imperialist Revolutionary Front for Socialism (FRAS). In the late 1970s, Schulte was trained in guerrilla tactics at the Nico Lopez cadre school in Cuba due to friendly relations between the PSR-ML and the communist Cuban government. In 1980, Schulte participated in the Revolutionary Left Alliance (ARI). He separated from his wife in 1981, and his wife and son Alejandro returned to Argentina that same year. Schulte married another woman and would have two children with her later on.

=== Tupac Amaru Revolutionary Movement ===
Schulte co-founded the Tupac Amaru Revolutionary Movement (MRTA) with Víctor Polay, and dedicated himself to recruiting members for the group between 1982 and 1984. In 1984, Schulte conducted an attack against the Villa El Salvador police station, marking the MRTA's first terrorist attack. He was arrested for the first time in 1988 at the Lima airport when attempting to travel to Mexico with Hugo Avellaneda to attend a meeting, and was released in 1989 due to lack of evidence of being with the MRTA.

Following his arrest, Schulte was appointed as the MRTA's commander in Lima and coordinated attacks for the group in the city. Schulte coordinated and participated in the kidnapping of businessman Hector Delgado Parker and the assassination of General Enrique López Albujar Trint. Schulte developed the people's prisons methodology employed by the MRTA, where the group's opponents were kidnapped and tortured. MRTA members would taunt the families with photos of the victims and Schulte would set ransoms.

In 1990, Schulte participated in the escape of Victor Polay and Lucero Cumpa which took place from a tunnel. Schulte was one of the most wanted terrorists in Latin America at the time of his arrest. He was arrested nine days after the 1992 Peruvian self-coup by Alberto Fujimori in a house located in a middle-class neighborhood next to a people's prison he operated. Schulte was sentenced to life imprisonment, and his release was one of the main demands of Néstor Cerpa Cartolini during Cartolini's seizure of the Japanese embassy in Lima in 1996.

=== Post-MRTA activity ===
Schulte claimed he and other MRTA members were arrested for "opposing the Fujimori dictatorship" in 2003. Schulte reconnected around that time with his son Alejandro, who wrote and directed a movie about him named Alias Alejandro, which released in 2005. The film was part of a competition by the German Film and Television Academy in Berlin, and Alejandro won a scholarship from the movie.

After serving 25 years in prison at the Callao Naval Base, Schulte was released in 2015. His sentence had been overturned, and he received a new trial by the Inter-American Court of Human Rights. After being released, Schulte traveled to Sweden.

In a 2016 interview, Schulte announced his intention to participate in politics through the Broad Front, and saw it as the only viable party. In the 2016 Peruvian general election, Schulte supported Verónika Mendoza in the first round and Pedro Pablo Kuczynski in the second. In the 2020 Peruvian parliamentary election, Schulte supported the Broad Front, Together for Peru, and Free Peru. He supported Pedro Castillo in 2021, and stated that he would return to Peru and enter politics if Castillo won.
