= Law enforcement in Peru =

Law enforcement in Peru is carried out by two organizations under the direction of the Ministry of the Interior:

- The National Police of Peru (Spanish: Policía Nacional del Perú, PNP), which acts as the national police force of Peru, and functions at both a state and local level. It acts mainly as a traffic control force, although other squadrons nominally fight crime, such as the Black Eagles, the only effectively organized of them.
- Watchmen Units (Spanish: Unidades de Serenazgo), which function as a dedicated municipal police force with limited jurisdiction in certain Peruvian cities and districts of Lima. Serenazgo officers have fewer legal powers than the National Police.

The majority of the police force is plagued by corruption.

== History ==
The history of law enforcement in Peru dates back to the age of the Incan Empire and subsequent Viceroyalty of the Spanish Empire. The establishment of a police force as a separate institution, however, only took place after the country's war of independence, operating as part of the Peruvian Armed Forces alongside separate watchmen units between 1825 until the establishment of the Peru–Bolivian Confederation in 1839.

A police force known as the Civic Militia (Milicia Cívica) was established in 1821 to keep public order. Its inspector general was José Bernardo de Tagle y Portocarrero, Marquis of Torre Tagle, who would later occupy the presidency of the country in 1823.

Under San Martín, the presidents of departmental governing bodies (juntas departamentales) were given the function of "police judges" (Jueces de Policía). As such their task was to oversee public morals and social progress in general. In 1822–23 police functions were organised under “commissioners” (Comisarios) and section leaders (Decuriones), with the support of the pre-existing neighbourhood leaders ( Alcaldes de Barrio). A secret police force, known as the Civil Brigade (Brigada Civil), also came into being at that time. Its mission was to identify those conspiring against independence, whose agents were infiltrating into the administrative structures of the new government, and even into the young armed forces.

The country's first constitution was promulgated in 1823, under the presidency of José Bernardo Tagle, and created three new ministries: Government and Foreign Relations (which took responsibility for policing), War and the Navy, and Finance. Although this constitution laid down that municipal councils should be in charge of the Policía de Orden, responsible for security and public order, it also included the Milicia Cívica and the Guardia de Policía as part of the land-based armed forces, together with the army. The Milicia Cívica would maintain “public security” within each province, while the Guardia de Policía would maintain “private security”, e.g. dealing with highway robbers, and prosecuting criminals.

In a decree issued on 7 January 1825, Simón Bolívar converted the Milicia Cívica into the Civil Forces (Fuerzas Civicas), with the task of ensuring public order within the provinces. The Civil Forces of the departamental capitals, modeled after the French National Guard, was staffed by soldiers released from army service and was organised on military lines; it remained part of the armed forces and constituted the army reserve. The 1826 constitution transferred police functions from municipal government (a relic of the viceroyal period) to the Ministry of Government, working through the prefectures and Intendencias. On 20 January 1827, during his first presidency, Andrés de Santa Cruz issued a provisional set of police regulations.

In 1834, under the presidency of Luis José de Orbegoso, the serenos (town watchmen) of the viceroyal period were re-constituted, now properly armed and in uniform. Soon afterwards, the “Arequipa regulations” created the posts of Inspector and Guard (Celador), and the Order and Internal Security Forces came under the superintendent of police in Lima, and under the sub-prefects in the provinces. Andrés de Santa Cruz's second administration (1836–1837) ordered increased security patrols nationwide, and the town level watchmen's detachments were cited during his term of office, previously, these detachments made up of paid watchmen mounted permanent surveillance duties.

In 1852, under José Rufino Echenique's presidency, the police forces were reorganized into one body, creating the Peruvian National Gendarmerie, which was activated on the same year. Like the National Guard, the Gendamerie was organized along military lines. The first Gendarmerie provisions were enacted in 1853 and 1855.

In 1855, under Ramón Castilla's second presidency, the gendarmerie was reorganized and merged into the existing Police Corps on April 7, 1856, setting strict entry requirements and increasing their numbers. In 1856, however, Juan Manuel del Mar raised a 150-man company of Guardsmen for the duties of public security in Lima, independent from the Gendarmerie proper, due to its pressing needs for security. On August 7 of 1861, the old organization of the Gendarmerie was disbanded. Replacing it, the infantry component of the Gendarmerie were, by now, the 1st and 2nd Gendarme Infantry Battalions, and the Gendarme Cavalry Squadron.

An 1873 decree by president Manuel Pardo once again reorganized the police forces of the country. The decree officially set the stage for a nationwide police reform, under which law enforcement was to be organized in the following:

- Neighborhood Organization, composed by the neighborhood residents against criminals, by the Mayors of the respective municipalities or cities.
- Police Services, composed of the Security Police in markets and public places.
- Police for Establishments
- Rural Police
- Prison Guards
- Port Police, regulated by the Peruvian Navy.
- Organization of the permanent forces, for the preservation of public order, preventing crimes and other similar problems.

=== 20th century ===
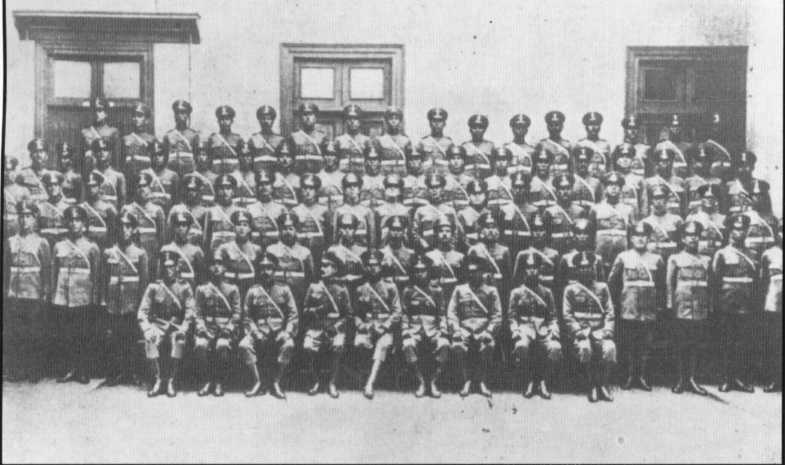
First Class of the Civil Guard Instruction School in 1923.

Under Augusto B. Leguía's second government, the police forces were again reorganized. The Republican Guard was formally established by supreme decree on August 7, 1919, having been modelled after the French Republican Guard at the suggestion of the Peruvian Army General Gerardo Alvarez. The Guard Battalion's mandate was to ensure security in all government buildings, especially "the security of the Government Palace and the National Congress."

Also modelled after a foreign unit, the Civil Guard was reorganized on the same year with the Spanish Civil Guard serving as a blueprint for the police body. A Spanish mission approved by King Alfonso XIII was sent to Lima with the purpose of providing full assistance in the modernization and reorganization of the police forces, working with veterans of the old Civil Guard and the remainder of what was then the National Gendarmerie. After arriving and having been received by the President, the mission started organizing the reform of the police forces, delivering within a month of their arrival, the documentation on January 21, 1922, having presented to President Leguía and the Minister for Police 14 bills that comprised the complete plan of reorganization of the state security forces were by then a topic of discussion in the National Congress. This study was approved no less than the President himself, who considered the plan proposed in the 14 projects mentioned, in order for the development of the national economy and to improve the security situation. As a result:

- The Civil Guard Charter for Peru was framed, similar to that used by the Spanish Civil Guard, with its 1st article stating Honor is the principal emblem of the Civil Guard, a distinction that must never be hurt, for when it is done it will never be repaired, and formalizing the proposals of the Spanish military mission to make it a uniformed, independent service away from the Armed Forces and the War Ministry and as part of the Police Ministry, but will keep its military form and traditions.
- The wartime role would be to reinforce the Armed Forces in the defense of the nation, also as stated in the Charter.
- The peacetime role would be for public security in rural communities, customs and port security, highway patrol, and border security and defense among others, also as stated in the Charter.
- The "GC" abbreviation, the same one used in Spain, will be formally adopted by the new service.

A Civil Guard instruction school was opened in 1922, also organized under the tutelage of the Spanish mission. During its inauguration ceremony, the Peruvian cry of "Viva el Perú" (Spanish: Long live Peru) was replaced by "Viva el Perú y la madre España" (Spanish: Long live Peru and the Spanish motherland).

After the creation of the School due to the Supreme Decree of July 3, 1922, there were first and a very careful recruitment of qualified personnel for the installation of the campus, getting the nomination very honorable and excellent military history for the kind of Captains, Lieutenants and Ensigns to be commissioned. Class sections for security and investigation were met with great care to conduct background and education and to that extent that every cadet's qualifications were met.

On October 12 of the same year, the Investigation and Surveillance Brigade (ISB) (Spanish: Brigada de Investigación y Vigilancia, BIV) was established, organized into the following:

- Presidential Section
- Foreigners Police
- Investigative Operations and Detection Section
- Fingerprinting Section

The tree units would continue to be reorganized, such as the ISB being renamed to the Peruvian Investigative Police in 1960; and cooperate with each other in armed conflicts during the early to mid 20th century, such as the Ecuadorian–Peruvian War of 1941, the 1965 Revolutionary Left Movement guerrilla conflict, the Púcuta Antisubversive Campaign (Spanish: Campaña Antisubversiva de Púcuta).

The revolutionary government of Juan Velasco Alvarado reached levels of discontent among the general public in the mid-1970s that reached the police. Low salaries and a particular incident where a subordinate of the Civil Guard publicly was insulted and slapped by the Head of the Military House, General Enrique Ibáñez Burga, for failing to comply with his orders of not allowing journalists to approach the President's vehicle, led to protests and strikes in the Peruvian capital. The protests later spiraled out of control, resulting in the deployment of the Peruvian Army and its violent suppression. These events became known as the Limazo, and led to even more discontent, bringing about the downfall of Alvarado's government in a coup d'état in 1980 known as the Tacnazo, organized by General Francisco Morales Bermúdez, which led the way to democracy through elections on the same year.

The Internal conflict in Peru began during the 1980 elections, escalating in the following decade. During the conflict, both the Republican Guard and the Civil Guard, as well as other government forces, were targets to attacks and assassinations, with 282 Civil Guard and 116 Republican Guard members being killed during the conflict between 1980 and 1988. The violent nature of the conflict led to atrocities and extrajudicial executions by both entities, with both claiming that those executed were terrorists.

During Alan García's presidency in this period, the 1986 Police Forces Act was signed, which formally laid the foundations for the definitive establishment of a new National Police. The Act established a single command (i.e. the Directorate General of Police) and also the formation of a single study center for the preparation of police officers (in the basis of Civil Guard Instruction Center "Mariano Santos" in La Campina – Chorrillos, and to be called the National Police Officer's School) and a national school for the guards and agents (referred to National Police headquarters at the former Republican Guard Superior Institute in Puente Piedra, today the National Police Technical College), directly under the Ministry of the Interior.

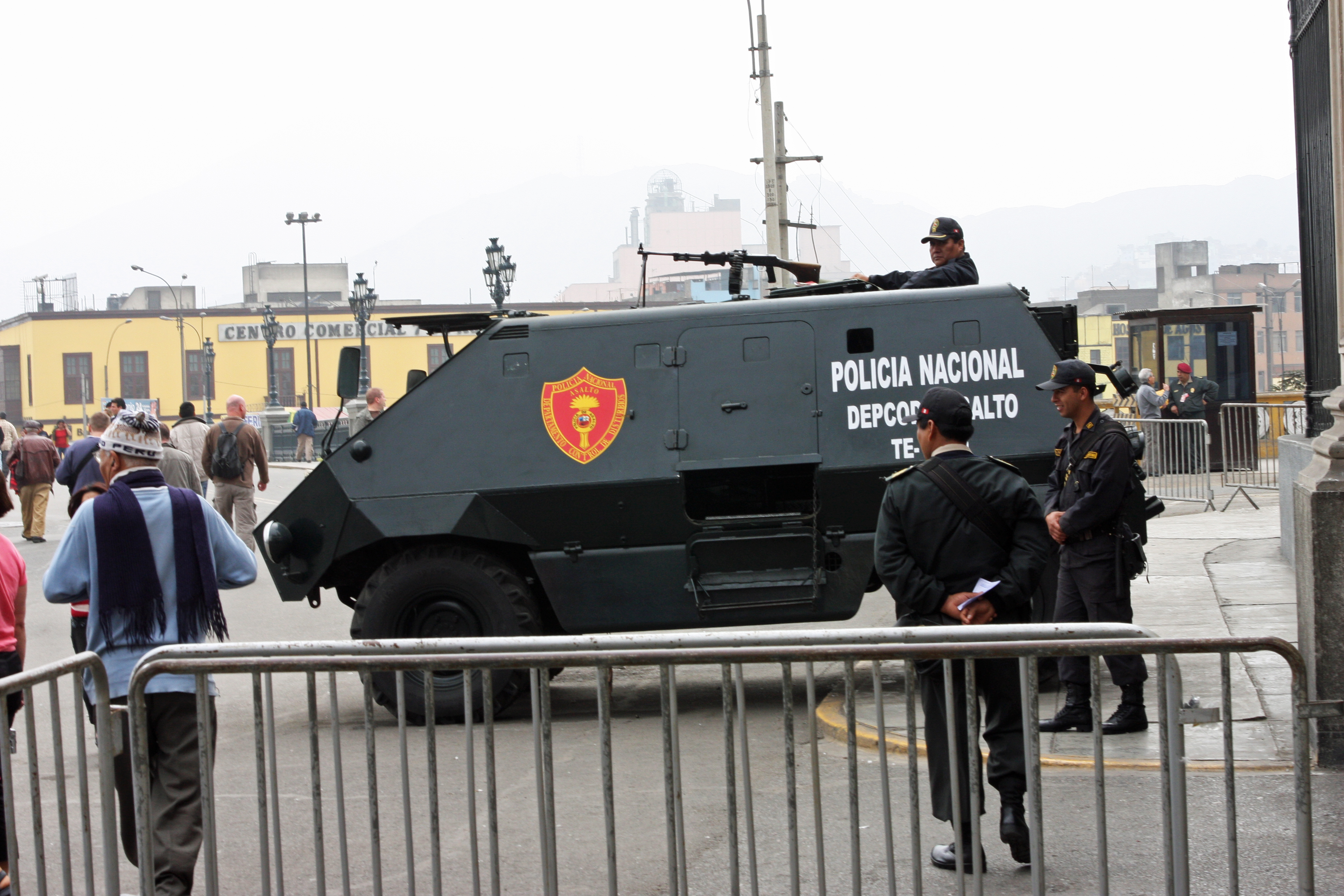
A Peruvian National Police checkpoint in Lima.

Law 24949 was finally enacted on December 6, 1988, amending the relevant articles of the 1979 Constitution of Peru with the aim of the formal foundation of the National Police of Peru, and took effect the next day. The objectives sought were, among others, to integrate the three police forces to make better use of economic resources, eliminate the conflict that existed between them caused by "double role" problems and, above all, provide better services to society.

With the unification of the police forces the Civil Guard became known as the "General Police" (Spanish: Policia General), the Republican Guard became the "Security Police" (Spanish: Policía de Seguridad) and the Investigative Police became the "Technical Police" (Spanish: Policía Técnica) until 1991, when all 3 commands of the National Police (PNP) were abolished and a single command created in its place.

A women's unit of the PNP began working in 1992, with its first class graduating on January 1, 1993. Subsequently, the second promotion of the School of Non-commissioned Officers of the Women's Police of the National Police of Peru entered, made up of 136 students who graduated on December 17, 1993. The unit's patron is 3rd PF-PNP Sub-Officer Marilyn Marisel Solier Gavilán, who was killed in an ambush set up by narcoterrorists in 2008.

== Defunct police agencies ==
- Civil Guard
- Republican Guard
- Peruvian Investigative Police

== See also ==
- Crime in Peru
