= Officers' School of the National Police of Peru =

Police academy in Peru

Coordinates: 12.1761°S 76.9917°W

Officers' School of the National Police of Peru Escuela de Oficiales de las Fuerzas Policiales
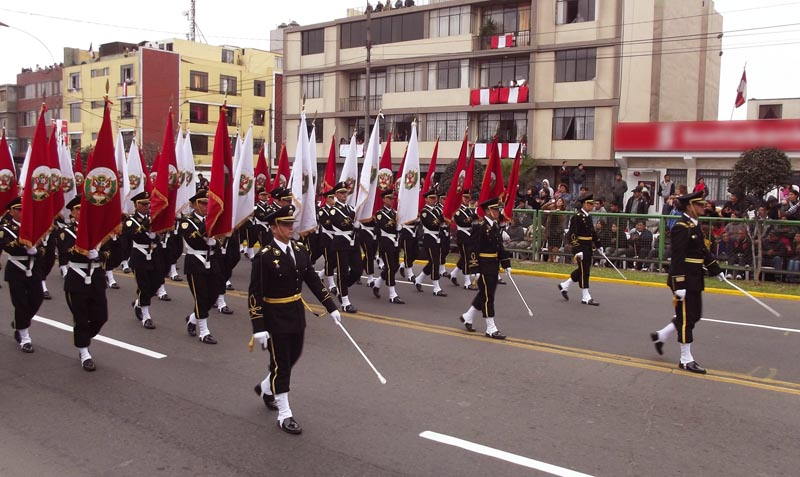
- School cadet company during the 2012 Great Military Parade of Peru

Location
- Chorrillos, Lima, Peru

Information
- Other name: EOPNP
- Former name: See list: Police School of the Republic (1922); Instruction Centre of the Civil Guard and Police (1922–1946); National Police School (1946–1960); Training Centre of the Civil Guard and Police (1960–1982); "Mariano Santos Mateo" Civil Guard Instruction Centre (1982–1987); EO-CIGC
- Type: Police academy
- Motto: Honor, Disciplina, Lealtad (Honour, Discipline, Loyalty)
- Patron saint(s): Mariano Santos Mateo
- Established: 1 November 1922
- Authority: National Police of Peru; Civil Guard (1922–1987)
- Headmaster: Ulises Benel Galarreta
- Song: Himno del Cadete

The Officers' School of the National Police of Peru (Spanish: Escuela de Oficiales de la Policía Nacional del Perú "Mariano Santos Mateo", EOPNP) is a police academy in charge of training law enforcement recruits in Peru. It is based in the Chorrillos District of Lima, and is considered the alma mater of the police officers of the country. Training at the school is carried out for 5 years, with the first year of education as an aspiring cadet and the remaining 4 years as a cadet.

The school's stated mission is to train cadres of police officers with university-level higher education, recognized by law. It plans, organizes, directs, coordinates, permanently executes, and evaluates educational activities, aimed at imparting humanistic knowledge and police science, as well as developing skills, abilities, and attitudes necessary for the efficient performance of the police function within the legal and disciplinary framework; ethical; and institutional values.

Currently, by Legislative Decree No. 1318 of January 3, 2017, the Officers' School is part of the National Police Professional Training School (Spanish: Escuela Nacional de Formación Profesional Policial).

== History ==
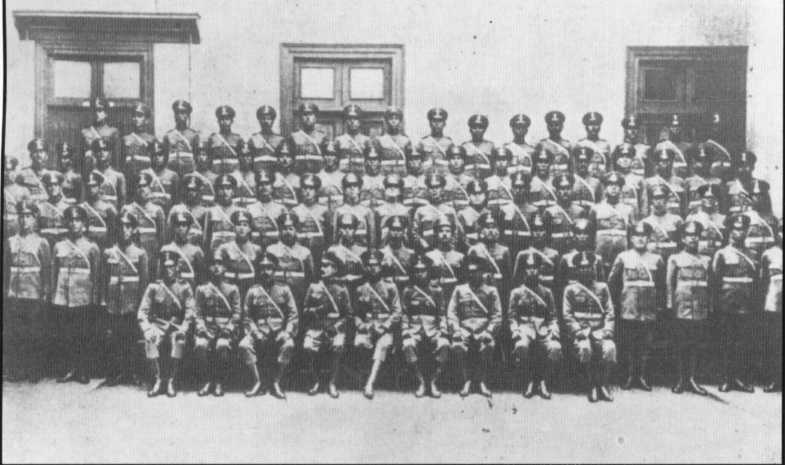
First Class of the Civil Guard Instruction School in 1923.

A Civil Guard instruction school was first opened in 1922, under the tutelage of a Spanish mission. During its inauguration ceremony, the Peruvian cry of "Viva el Perú" (Spanish: Long live Peru) was replaced by "Viva el Perú y la madre España" (Spanish: Long live Peru and the Spanish motherland).

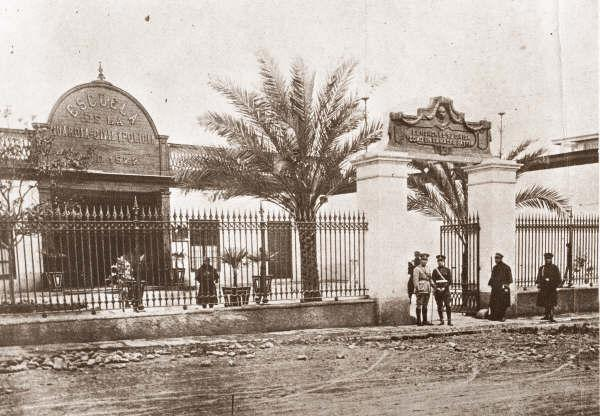
The Civil Guard Instruction School in 1923.

After the creation of the School due to the Supreme Decree of July 3, 1922, there was first a very careful recruitment of qualified personnel for the installation of the campus, getting the nomination of very honorable and excellent military history for the kind of Captains, Lieutenants and Ensigns to be commissioned. Class sections for security and investigation were met with great care to conduct background and education, and to the extent that every cadet's qualifications were met.

The location chosen for the State Police Academy was the former Hospice of Mercy Hospital, 796 Sebastian Lorente Ibáñez Avenue (formerly known as the Avenue of the Incas) in the traditional Lima District, which was renovated days after the decree took effect. The academy officially opened its doors on November 1 the very same year. The opening was presided over by President Augusto B. Leguía, together with government officials, the diplomatic corps, and military officials and attaches attending. The Spanish community of Lima also graced the event and the Spanish mission chief, LTCOL Pedro Pueyo y España, SCG, entrusted the State War Color to the academy as its director after it was blessed officially by military chaplains and handed over to the President. It was followed by the oath-taking of the first cadets of the academy. A plaque was unveiled by the presiding officers to commemorate the occasion of its formal opening, and the first Corps of Cadets performed its first march past.

As part of the opening a giant sign was made in the school entrance with the words of the Civil Guard motto, El honor es su divisa como la madre patria (Honor is its emblem with the mother country), made by no less than President Leguía himself who adapted to Peru the Spanish Civil Guard motto. Classes commenced on November 4, 1922, and its first graduation and passing out parade was held on Sept. 3, 1923, for the first of what became 59 graduating classes of officers.

The strength of the first class of graduates from the Police Academy, addressed to the Commissioners for Lima, constituted the State Security Corps and the first Corps of Cadets was made up of:

- 30 Peruvian Army Officer Cadets
- 104 Officer and NCO Cadets
- 19 Technical Cadets of the course of Investigation

In December 1965, during the closing ceremony of the academic year at the academy, its new premises were inaugurated at its current location. At the beginning of 1966, the progressive transfer of the C.I.G.C. facilities began, starting with the Guards School, to its new premises located in the La Campiña urbanization in Chorrillos. The total transfer of the C.I.G.C. It culminated in the first days of September 1973 with the complete installation of the C.I.G.C Officers School that began in 1972.

Like the Civil Guard, the Peruvian Investigative Police and the Republican Guard also had their own schools, also merged into the EOPNP in 1987.

== List of headmasters ==
From 1922 to 1986 the School had 33 headmasters, officially known as directors:

| No. | Rank | Name | Years |
|---|---|---|---|
| 1 | GCE Colonel | Pedro Pueyo España | 1922-1923 |
| 2 | GCE Colonel | Bernardo Sanchez Visaires | 1923–1924; 1926–1927; 1928 |
| 3 | GCE Colonel | Antonio Sanchez y Sanchez | 1924-1925 |
| 4 | GCE Colonel | Juan Vara Teran | 1925-1926 |
| 5 | GCE General | Juan Gil de León | 1929-1930 |
| 6 | EP Lt. Col. | Jose F. Vasquez Benavides | 1930-1931 |
| 7 | GC Lt. Col. | Emilio Vega y Vega | 1931-1935 |
| 8 | GC Colonel | Manuel Pio Portugal Ramirez | 1935-1936 |
| 9 | GC Colonel | Isaias Moron Marquez | 1936-1937 |
| 10 | GC Colonel | Elias Rosas Moran | 1937–1941; 1945; 1946 |
| 11 | GC Colonel | Fernando Rincón Jaramillo | 1941-1945 |
| 12 | GC Colonel | Jose Caceres Valdivia | 1946 |
| 13 | GC General | Teobaldo Castro León | 1947-1948 |
| 14 | GC General | Guillermo Rivera Ballon | 1948-1955 |
| 15 | GC General | José Valdivia Stambury | 1955-1957 |
| 16 | GC General | Luis Rizo Patrón Lembcke | 1957-1958 |
| 17 | GC General | Jose Monzon Linares | 1958 |
| 18 | GC General | Andres Arcentales Velez | 1959 |
| 19 | GC General | Enrique Canales Gutierrez | 1959-1961 |
| 20 | GC General | Julio Samaniego Hilares | 1961-1966 |
| 21 | GC General | Antonio Nuñez Vidalon | 1966-1968 |
| 22 | GC General | Eduardo Rada Cordova | 1969-1971 |
| 23 | GC General | Gastón Zapata de la Flor | 1971-1973 |
| 24 | GC General | Manuel Legarda Catalán | 1973-1974 |
| 25 | GC General | Humberto Flores Valverde | 1975-1976 |
| 26 | GC General | Hector Ordoñez Garcia | 1977-1978 |
| 27 | GC General | Ernesto Aguilar Heredia | 1979-1980 |
| 28 | GC General | Raúl Pareja Gutiérrez | 1981 |
| 29 | GC Colonel | Danilo Agramonte Gutierrez | 1982 |
| 30 | GC General | Hector Rivera Hurtado | 1982-1983 |
| 31 | GC General | Julio Hernan Alzamora Garcia | 1984 |
| 32 | GC General | Ruben Romero Sanchez | 1985 |
| 33 | FF.PP. General | Eduardo Ruiz Botto | 1986 |

== See also ==
- Law enforcement in Peru
