= Limazo =

1975 riot in Lima

- Part of the Revolutionary Government of the Armed Forces of Peru
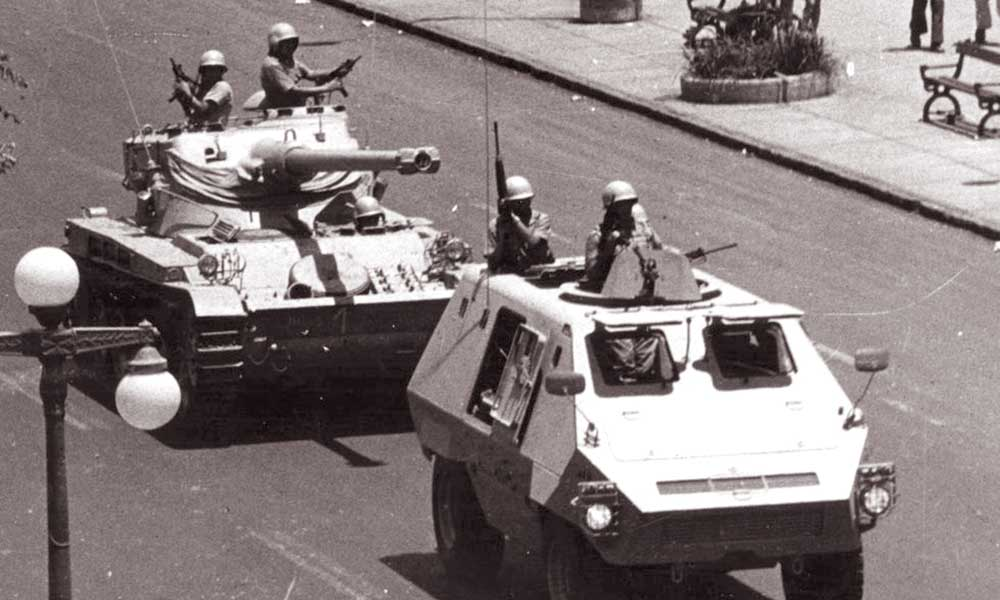
- Military vehicles during the riots
| Date | 3–5 February 1975 |
| Location | Lima, Peru |
| Result | Suppressed by the Peruvian Army; Persecution of communists by the Peruvian Armed Forces |

Belligerents
| Peruvian government: Peruvian Armed Forces; (Peru) Peruvian Army; Investigative Police | Peruvian police (Note: The Peruvian police was then divided into three independent branches: the Civil Guard (GC), Investigative Police (PIP) and Republican Guard (GR). Of the three, the first was the oldest and had the largest number of members and the largest budget. In 1988 the three branches were unified by the García government into the National Police of Peru (PNP).): Republican Guard; Civil Guard; American Popular Revolutionary Alliance: Student Revolutionary Alliance (ARE); Supported by United States (alleged): CIA (alleged) |

Commanders and leaders
| Juan Velasco Alvarado | Insurgent members of the Civil Guard; APRA militants |

Units involved
| Peruvian Army: 2nd Army Division; Armored Division | Civil Guard: 9th Region; Radio Patrulla Garrison; APRA militants CIA (alleged) |

Casualties and losses
| 71 killed and wounded | 170 killed and wounded 1,012 arrested 53 policemen prosecuted |

The Limazo (from Lima and the Spanish suffix azo, meaning blow or violent), also known as the Febrerazo, was a police strike and citywide unrest that occurred in Lima, beginning on February 3, 1975. The unrest was allegedly instigated by the CIA and APRA, and was violently suppressed by the Peruvian Armed Forces by February 5.

The chaos and perceived lack of proper government response caused by the insurrection brought as a consequence the worsening of the political crisis faced by the government of Juan Velasco Alvarado, which would be deposed by a coup d'état by Francisco Morales Bermúdez in August 1975, ending the first phase of the revolutionary government.

== Background ==
The Revolutionary Government of the Armed Forces that seized power in 1968, had for over 6 years introduced a series of reforms, mostly of a nationalist and left-wing nature. One of them involved the expropriation of media. The television stations and radios were expropriated in November 1971 and, at midnight from Friday 26 to Saturday 27 July 1974, the headquarters of the last Lima newspapers that still maintained their autonomy, La Prensa (owned by Pedro Beltrán), Ultima Hora, El Comercio, Correo, and Ojo, were occupied. As a consequence of the expropriations, for the first time in the streets of Lima there were demonstrations against the government. On July 28–30, in the district of Miraflores, a protest was organized in the streets and squares of Lima. In response, more than 400 civilians were detained and government propaganda limited itself to ridiculing the protest, referring to it as being of an oligarchic nature.

== Timeline ==
Popular discontent also reached members of the police, mostly from popular and lower middle sectors, who felt neglected by the military forces, who considered them as “auxiliary forces” and, furthermore, had no representation whatsoever in government agencies. Other causes of police discontent were their low salaries and an incident where a subordinate of the Civil Guard publicly was insulted and slapped by the Head of the Military House, General Enrique Ibáñez Burga, for failing to comply with his orders of not allowing journalists to approach the President's vehicle.

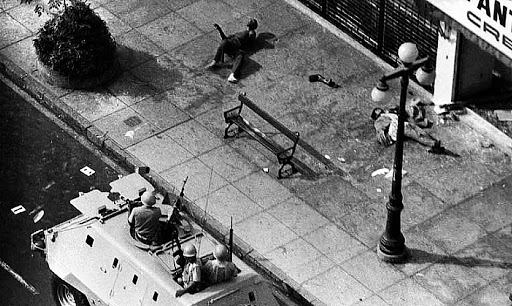
A tank drives past two wounded civilians during the unrest

The police demonstration began on Saturday, February 1, 1975, and the next day it spread from police station to station, forming a representative commission that was installed at the headquarters of Radio Patrulla, on 28 de Julio Avenue in the district of La Victoria. The policemen threatened a total strike if their claims were not addressed; When the negotiations failed, they consummated the threat and on Tuesday the 5th Lima was completely unguarded. In the late afternoon of that day, the consequences began to be felt, especially due to traffic congestion and the increase in robberies and crime.

Around midnight from Tuesday 4 to Wednesday 5 February, armored units of the Army besieged Radio Patrulla demanding the surrender of the police leaders and the end of the strike; As there was no response, at four in the morning the premises were seized violently. Many policemen fled and others surrendered. In the surrounding neighborhoods, the population could hear the clatter of machine guns and the roar of tanks. Due to the military siege of the area, which prevented access, it was never possible to specify the number of deaths and injuries among the strikers. The official version denied that there had been casualties. After completing its work, the Army withdrew.

In the streets of Lima the situation was one of uncertainty. The population feared leaving their homes, but little by little the lack of control resulting from the strike motivated criminal groups and opponents of the regime to form vandalism mobs that dedicated themselves exclusively to looting and setting fires. The mobs ran through the city and set fire to the Military Casino (located in San Martín Plaza), the premises of the Correo newspaper and the Civic Center (where the government's SINAMOS offices were located). These attacks were reportedly led by Aprista students who were attempting to direct looting of government buildings. The rioters then headed towards the headquarters of the Expreso newspaper, but its workers blocked the entrances with huge reels of paper and defended themselves. At the same time, the rest of the city was looting shops and supermarkets.

From the Government Palace the departure of the troops of the II Military Region, based in Lima, was ordered by General Leonidas Rodríguez Figueroa. The troops, mounted in tanks, tanks and even helicopters, left at noon and repressed the looters with blood and fire. Likewise, through an official statement, the government suspended constitutional guarantees and declared a curfew as of 6 in the afternoon. On the 6th, it was arranged that the curfew was at 8 p.m. Later it was at 10 p.m., and finally at midnight, but some time passed without her being able to retire permanently.

From the Government Palace the departure of the troops of the II Military Region, based in Lima, was ordered by General Leonidas Rodríguez Figueroa. The troops, mounted in tanks and helicopters, left at noon and violently repressed the looters. Likewise, through an official communiqué, the government suspended constitutional guarantees and declared a curfew from 6 in the afternoon. On the 6th, it was arranged that the curfew was at 8 p.m. Later it was at 10 p.m., and finally at midnight.

== Aftermath ==
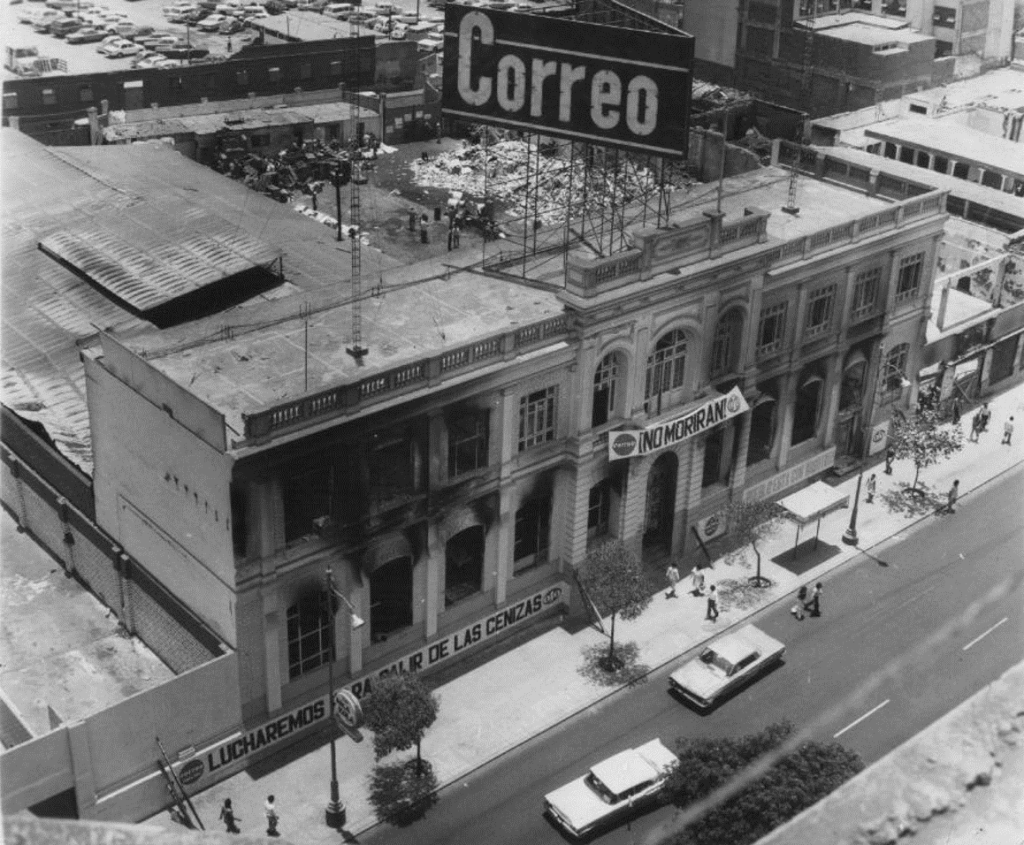
Correo headquarters after the fire.

The government officially accused the CIA and the Aprista Party of encouraging the riots and protests, and general discontent by the Peruvian public continued to increase as a result of the event. The official figures released by the government were: 86 dead, 1,550 wounded, 1,012 detained and 53 police officers on trial.

The APRA was criticized, with Correo, whose building had been attacked during the events, publishing a caricature of Víctor Raúl Haya de la Torre surrounded by arsonist thugs with the caption "Only APRA will burn Peru", in reference to the party's motto, "Only APRA will save Peru".

The same year there was talk about an imminent declaration of war against Chile, giving the date, according to rumors, as the first days of August in commemoration of the battle of Junín. These provisions were not fulfilled and the situation became definitely unsustainable, since unemployment and the cost of living rose constantly while inflation reached 24% due to the lack of investment due to insecurity. Finally, on August 29, a coup led from Tacna by General Francisco Morales Bermúdez, former Minister of Finance of the regime, dismissed Velasco and began the second phase of the Revolutionary Government of the Armed Forces.

== See also ==
- Tacnazo
