= Sinchis =

Paratrooper unit in Peru

- Dirección Táctica Rural "Los Sinchis"
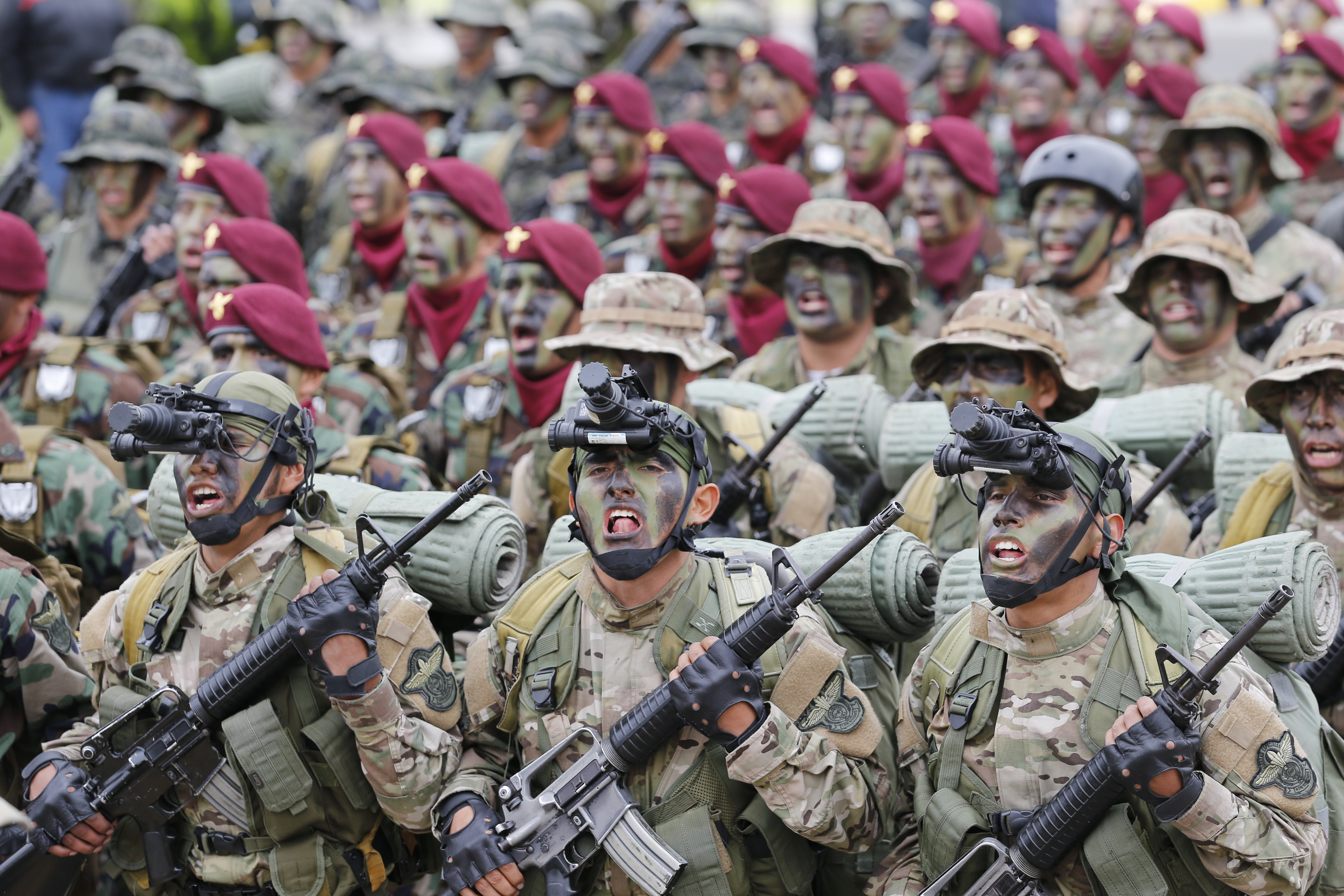
- Members marching in Chorrillos
- Active: 1965–present
- Country: Peru
- Allegiance: President of Peru
- Type: Police tactical unit
- Role: Air assault Anti-irregular military Bodyguard; Bomb disposal Clandestine operation Close-quarters battle Countering illicit drug trafficking Counterinsurgency; Counterterrorism; Crowd control Direct action Force protection Hostage rescue Jungle warfare Law enforcement Long-range penetration Manhunt; Mountain warfare Parachuting; Patrolling; Raiding; Riot control Reconnaissance; Special operations Special reconnaissance Tracking; Urban warfare
- Part of: National Police of Peru; Civil Guard (1965–1991)
- Garrison/HQ: Mazamari
- Motto(s): Worthy of life are those alone who are willing to die for a noble cause (Spanish: Sólo merece vivir quién por un noble ideal está dispuesto a morir)
- March: Sinchi Anthem (Spanish: Himno Sinchi)
- Anniversaries: 21 June
- Engagements: 1965 guerrilla conflict in Peru; Internal conflict in Peru

The Sinchis (from the Quechua word sinchi, 'strong, brave'), also known as the Sinchis de Mazamari after their training location, are a police tactical unit of the National Police of Peru specialized in air assault and airborne operations, anti-irregular military, countering illicit drug trafficking, counterinsurgency, counterterrorism, hostage rescue crisis management, and operating in difficult to access terrain especially in mountainous forest areas.

The commando unit was part of the Civil Guard from its formation in 1965 until 1991, when it was incorporated into the National Police of Peru. The Sinchis played an important role in the counterinsurgency war against the Shining Path during the internal conflict in Peru in the 1980s and 1990s. According to the Truth and Reconciliation Commission, the commando unit is responsible for operating in difficult to access terrain and serious crimes committed against the Quechua population of the regions of Ayacucho, Apurimac and Huancavelica.

== Mission ==
The unit's missions primarily involve anti-irregular military, apprehension of armed and dangerous criminals, countering illicit drug trafficking, counterterrorism and hostage rescue crisis management, counterinsurgency, executive protection, high-risk tactical law enforcement situations, operating in difficult to access terrain especially in mountainous forest areas, protecting high-level meeting areas, providing security in areas at risk of attack or terrorism, special reconnaissance in difficult to access and dangerous areas, support crowd control and riot control, and other tactical special operations.

== Etymology ==
In all Quechuan languages, the word sinchi is frequent and has the meaning “hard, resilient, stubborn, strong, brave”. In Ayacuchan Quechua, its main meaning is “abundant” or, as an adverb, “enough”. It applies both to people and to things or conditions, and for this reason it can also mean "huge, great". It can also mean “warrior” or “soldier”, especially in the context of the Incas. The plural of sinchi in Quechua is sinchikuna.

== History ==
The unit was first created during the first government of Fernando Belaúnde Terry as the 48th Command of the Civil Guard on June 21, 1965, in the town of Mazamari. At that time the Revolutionary Left Movement, a guerrilla group led by Luis de la Puente Uceda, was operating in the province of Satipo. The Sinchis were trained in commando styles by the Central Intelligence Agency (CIA) and United States Army Special Forces (Green Berets), and financed entirely by the United States. In 1966, the Armed Forces of Peru managed to defeat the guerrillas.

After Juan Velasco Alvarado's coup, the Sinchis no longer received US support. However, in 1969 the unit was sent to Huanta in the Department of Ayacucho to put down widespread violent protests against the imposition of a charge of at least one hundred soles on those who failed a course. In the so-called Huanta Rebellion, some twenty students and peasants were killed by the Sinchis and other police forces. Nevertheless, the Velasco dictatorship repealed the decree.

On September 5, 1979, peasants from the community of San Juan de Ondores occupied the lands of the Atocsaico estate, which had been taken over by the Cerro de Pasco Copper Corporation in 1926 and in the Agrarian Reform of 1969 was not returned to the community but rather handed over to the Túpac Amaru Agricultural Society of Social Interest, although in 1963 a court had annulled the sale of Atocsaico. The peasants demanded the restitution of the lands to the community. On December 18, 1979, the government of Francisco Morales Bermúdez sent 300 Sinchis who forced the peasants to vacate the state lands. The latter responded with stones. The Sinchis opened fire resulting in two peasants being killed, some 15 wounded and 44 detained.

On October 12, 1981, when the Shining Path attacked the Tambo police post in the La Mar Province in Ayacucho, President Fernando Belaunde Terry declared a state of emergency in Ayacucho and sent 193 police officers, including 40 Sinchis, to Ayacucho. The Sinchis had their headquarters in the city of Huamanga, where there were never more than 120 of them. However, in their helicopters they arrived very quickly at the towns of the region, never more than nine men. Almost all of the Sinchis were coastal residents who did not speak the language of the region’s peasant population, Ayacuchan Quechua, or know anything about their culture. According to testimonies kept by the Truth and Reconciliation Commission, the Sinchis committed numerous human rights abuses.

In September 1982, the Sinchis arrived in two helicopters in Chalcos, presented themselves as protectors against the Shining Path terrorists and organized sports activities. After two weeks, however, they got drunk, arrested the teachers and killed them, accusing them of being terrorists.

In January 1983, the Sinchis entered the community of Uchuraccay and instilled in the peasants to kill everyone who came on foot because the Sinchis always came by helicopter. A few days later, on January 26, 1983, the community members killed eight journalists and two other people, calling them terrorists. In the months afterward, the town was eradicated by the Shining Path.

One of the most well-known atrocities was the Socos (or Soccos; Quechua: Suqus or Soqos) massacre, a community in Huamanga Province, in which 32 men, women and children were murdered on November 13, 1983 by one unit of Sinchis.

On February 8, 1984, criminal proceedings were opened by the First Court of Huamanga for aggravated homicide and attempted homicide, and on July 15, 1986, eleven defendants were sentenced, including six Sinchis, for the murder of the 32 inhabitants of Socos and for attempted murder, while 15 defendants were acquitted. The subjects were sentenced to prison terms between 10 and 25 years, but the first was released on December 1, 1988, the last on June 17, 1991, with parole. Civil Guard Lieutenant Luis Alberto Dávila Reátegui, sentenced to no less than 25 years, was released on parole on April 5, 1991.

In 1989, the Shining Path began to infiltrate the Ene River valley in the Satipo Province in the Department of Junín. The Drug Enforcement Administration (DEA) and the Green Berets took over the Cutivireni mission in the Río Tambo District of the same province, where some 700 Asháninka lived with Franciscan missionaries, as a military base to combat terrorists and drug traffickers. Some Ashaninkas abandoned the mission and joined Shining Path, while others began to fight with the Sinchis against the guerrillas. Many Ashaninka on both sides fell. 169 Asháninka under the direction of Father Mariano Gagnon were transferred to Kirigueti, a Machiguenga town in the Urubamba valley.

== See also ==
- Paratrooper Company, another paratrooper unit deployed during the 1941 Ecuadorian–Peruvian War

== Bibliography ==
- Gorriti Ellenbogen, Gustavo (2009). Sendero: historia de la guerra milenaria en el Perú (2nd ed.). Editorial Planeta Perú.
- Ludescher, Monika (1999). Estado e Indígenas en el Perú. Una Análisis del Marco Legal y su Aplicación. Vol. 10. Martinus Nijhoff Publishers.
