= Mariano Santos Mateo =

Peruvian war hero

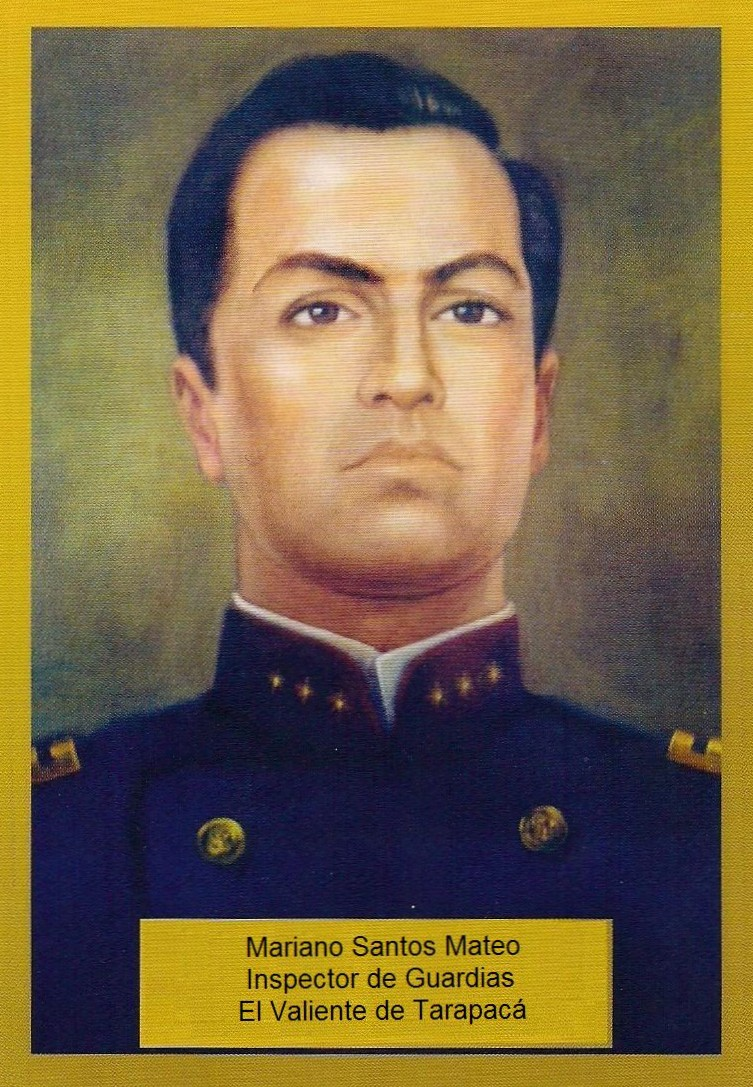
- Posthumous portrait
- Nickname: The Brave man of Tarapacá
- Born: 1850; Lucre, Peru
- Died: 7 October 1900 (aged 49–50) Cusco, Peru
- Allegiance: Peru
- Branch: Civil Guard
- Service years: 1875–1883
- Rank: Inspector de Guardias (Civil Guard); Gran General (Police, posthumous)
- Conflicts: War of the Pacific; Battle of San Francisco; Battle of Tarapacá; Battle of Tacna (WIA)
- Awards: National Hero of Peru (1981)

Mariano Santos Mateo (1850 – 7 October 1900) was a Peruvian Civil Guard officer who fought in the War of the Pacific. He became famous by capturing, during the Battle of Tarapacá, the war ensign of the 2nd Infantry Regiment "Maipo" of the Chilean Army, for which he was nicknamed the Brave Man of Tarapacá.

== Early life ==
Santos was born in 1850 in Lucre District, Cuzco. His parents were Colonel Carlos Santos Ego, an Argentine soldier who arrived in Peru with the Liberating Expedition of Peru commanded by General José de San Martín, and Antonia Mateo Chara, who lived in Cuzco. At 20 years of age he left his hometown for Arequipa, where in 1875 he joined the Civil Guard of Peru.

== Military career ==
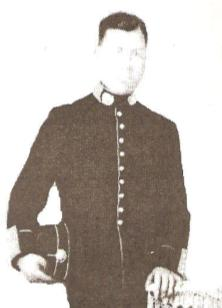
Mateo in military uniform.

In 1879, a war with Chile broke out. As a result, the Peruvian government ordered the creation of new military bodies who were to fight in the conflict. The first to be called up to the ranks of the army were the civil guards from different cities, who due to their training and the characteristics of their job, were in a situation comparable to that of the line army soldiers.

Colonel Alejandro Bezada, then Prefect of Arequipa, organized a division of 560 men, whose command he himself assumed, setting off southward in the first half of April 1879. These forces were made up of two columns of the Civil Guard of Arequipa, the Gendarmerie of Arequipa and Puno and the National Guard of Arequipa, the same ones that later formed with the Ayacucho Battalion the Third Division of the Peruvian Army of the South. Mariano Santos was in the 1st Company of Column "A" of the Civil Guard of Arequipa. In this way, the Arequipa Guards Battalion was formed, made up of six Civil Guard Companies and a Gendarmes Column, with a total of 560 men.

Shortly after his arrival in Iquique, Bezada died in an accident, being replaced by Colonel Manuel Carrillo y Ariza. As a result, the Third Division of the Army of the South was commanded by Colonel Francisco Bolognesi Cervantes.

When news of the seizure of the Peruvian port of Pisagua was heard, the Arequipa Guards Battalion marched to face the Chilean Army. As part of the Third Division of the Peruvian Army of the South, the Arequipa Guards Battalion took part in the Battle of San Francisco, commanded by Colonel Carrillo y Ariza, together with the Ayacucho Battalion of Colonel Manuel Antonio Prado. After the defeat, the unit marched to San Lorenzo de Tarapacá, where on 27 November 1879 the battle of the same name would take place and in which the battalion to which Mariano Santos belonged would be entrusted the defense of it.

=== Battle of Tarapacá ===
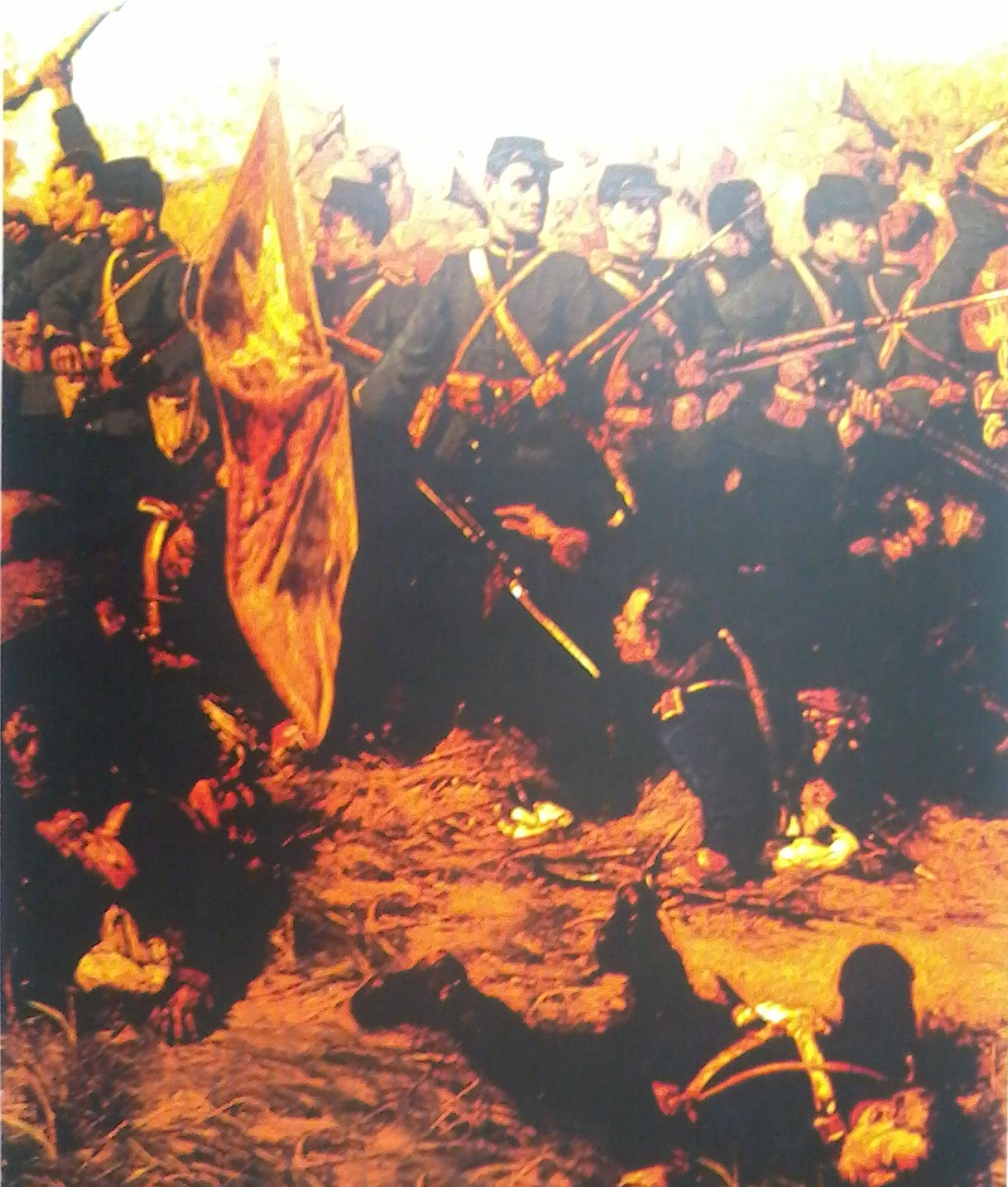
Painting of Santos Mateo holding the captured Chilean flag.

On 27 November 1879, Tarapacá was attacked by the 2nd Infantry Regiment "Maipo" of the Chilean Army. During the combat, which took place in the streets of the town, Santos, with a bayonet in hand, managed to seize the war ensign of the Chilean regiment after a bloody fight in which the entire escort perished.

For this action, Mariano Santos was called the Brave Man of Tarapacá (Spanish: El valiente de Tarapacá), with Colonel Bolognesi highlighting the event and the soldier himself in his later writings detailing the battle.

On the Chilean side, the new commander of the regiment Liborio Echanez (due to the death of his first commander) wrote to his superiors the following:

Equally deserving of special distinction is the escort of the banner made up of brave veterans, all awarded... These individuals, fighting like lions in defense of their beloved deposit, all perished at their posts, and before they died, three of the last to fall took the timely precaution of burning the banner, rather than allow it to be insulted and sullied by the enemies of their country.

Shortly after learning that the banner had been captured by the Peruvian troops, the Chilean press circulated the version that Second Lieutenant Barahona, when he was mortally wounded, had rolled wrapped in the banner at the bottom of the ravine without the rest of the regiment being able to recover it and where the Peruvians allegedly recovered it.

After the victory, the Peruvian Army continued its march to the port of Arica. In a solemn ceremony held on 31 January 1880 at the door of the Cathedral of San Marcos, Rear Admiral Lizardo Montero decorated and promoted Santos Mateo to Inspector de Guardias, a Civil Guard rank equivalent to that of Army Lieutenant at that time. The captured trophy remained in the church of that city, from where it was later transferred to that of Tacna, where it would later be found by Chilean troops some time later and returned to its regiment before the Lima campaign.

Mariano Santos would later fight in the Battle of Tacna where he would be seriously injured. When he arrived in Arequipa with the remnants of the Southern Army, after recovering from the wound he suffered, he was honored by the city's authorities by awarding him a gold medal. He was given a new uniform by the city in order to replace the torn and blood-soaked one in which he had returned from the campaign, the same one he wore at the banquet held in his honor on 24 September 1880.

== Later life ==
After the end of the war he returned to Cuzco, where he married Julia Herrera, with whom he had children, living a peaceful life cultivating his family's land. He died in the city of Cuzco on 7 October 1900. His remains were buried in the Oropesa cemetery in Quispicanchi.

== Legacy ==
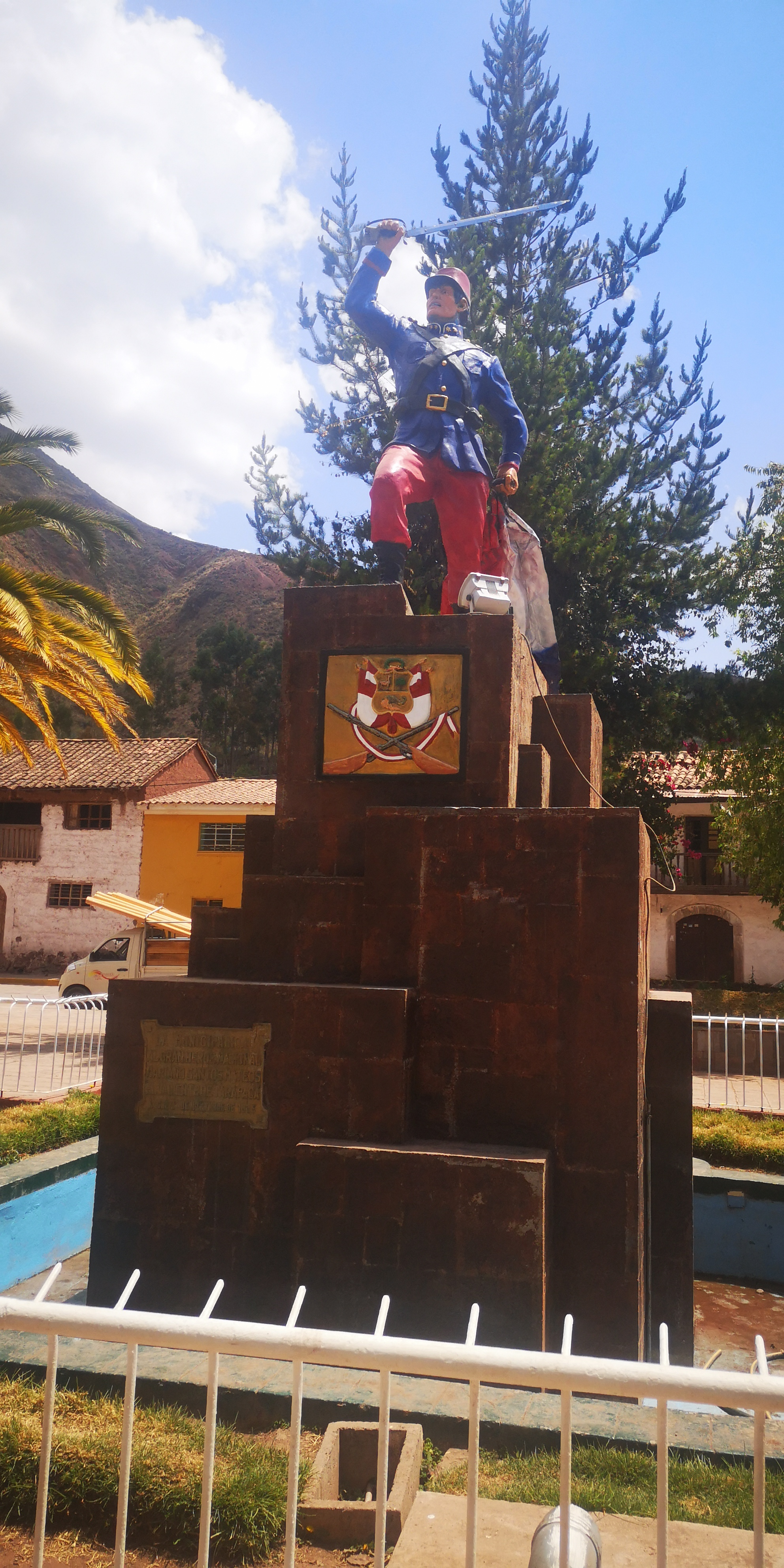
Monument to Santos in his hometown.

The Congress of the Republic of Peru, through Law No. 23316, published in the Official Gazette El Peruano on 7 November 1981, declared him a National Hero. Subsequently, it passed Law No. 27018 of 21 December 1998, by which his hierarchy in the National Police of Peru was specified, granting him the Police Rank of Alférez.

On 25 August 2000, his remains were transferred to the Crypt, built in the Camposanto "Santa Rosa de Lima" Ecological Park, destined to preserve the remains of the heroes and martyrs of the National Police of Peru.

Law No. 29161 of 18 December 2007 conferred on Mariano Santos Mateo the honorary rank of Grand General of the National Police of Peru.

On Monday, 31 December 2007, the Minister of the Interior, Luis Alva Castro, announced that the Hall of the Ambassadors of the Government Palace of Peru would bear the name of the national hero Mariano Santos Mateo.

== See also ==
- Alipio Ponce
- José Quiñones Gonzales

== Bibliography ==
- Peraltilla Díaz, Artemio (1984). El Héroe de Arica nació en Arequipa en 1822 [The hero of Arica was born in Arequipa in 1822] (in Spanish). El Sol.
