= Alipio Ponce =

Peruvian war hero

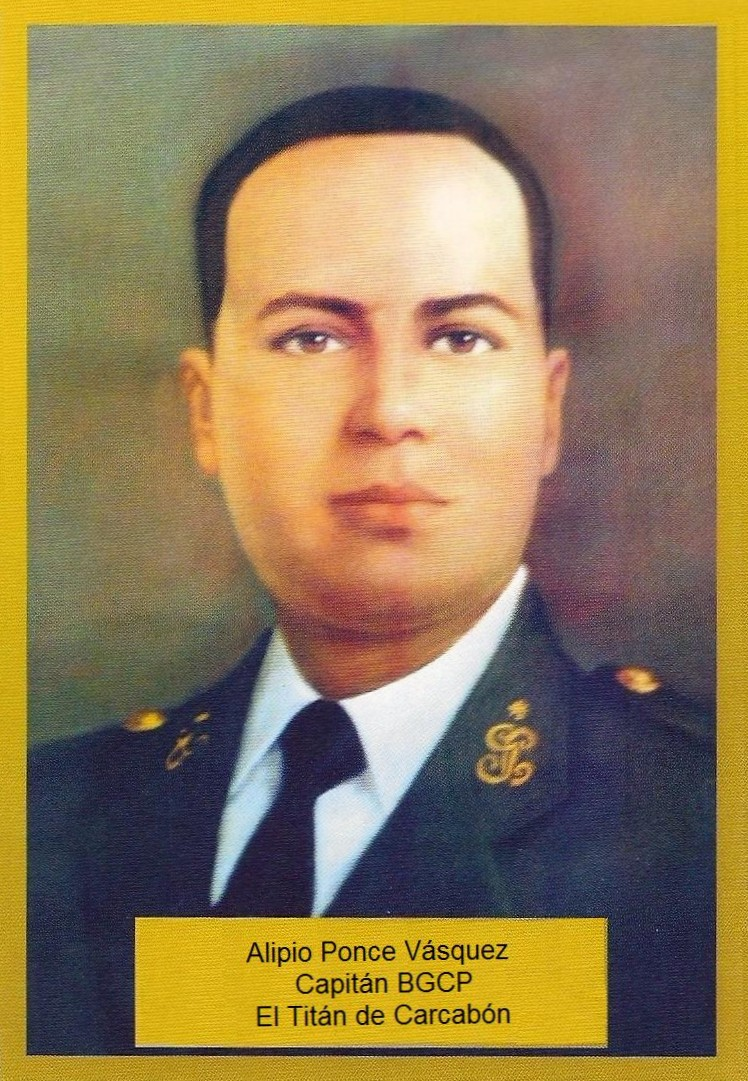
- Posthumous portrait
- Nickname: The Titan of Carcabón
- Born: Alipio Ponce Vásquez; August 15, 1906; San Lorenzo, Jauja, Peru
- Died: September 11, 1941 (aged 35) Porotillo, Ecuador
- Allegiance: Peru
- Branch: Civil Guard
- Service years: 1924–1941
- Rank: C.G. Captain (posthumous)
- Conflicts: Ecuadorian–Peruvian War: Battle of Zarumilla; Porotillo Ambush †
- Awards: Hero of the Civil Guard (1978); Patron of the Civil Guard (1978); National Hero of Peru (1987)

Alipio Ponce Vásquez (August 15, 1906 – September 11, 1941) was a Peruvian police officer who fought and died during the 1941 Ecuadorian–Peruvian War.

The son of a farmer, Ponce Vásquez was born in San Lorenzo district, Jauja Province. He joined the Civil Guard in 1924, was promoted to Corporal in 1927 and to Second Sergeant in 1930. In 1935, he was admitted as an under officer - pupil at the old Civil Guard Officers Academy, which he left in 1937 with the grade of Ensign. He was promoted to Lieutenant in 1941.

During the 1941 war, policemen of the Civil Guard were sent to the northern frontier. Ponce Vásquez took part in a successful attack at Quebrada Seca (July 23) and led two victorious attacks at Carcabón (July 25) and Huabillos (July 26). He was killed during an ambush in Porotillo, Ecuador.

He was posthumously promoted to Captain on September 23, 1941, was declared a Civil Guard hero on August 29, 1978 and a National Hero on April 24, 1987.

== See also ==
- Mariano Santos Mateo
