= Andean Information Network =

The Andean Information Network (Red Andína de Informacíón) or AIN is a Bolivian non-profit non-governmental organization founded in 1992 to raise awareness on the drug war and human rights, particularly in the coca-growing areas of Bolivia. The AIN publishes and distributes reports, including media analysis and independent studies which have been cited by many organizations, including the United Nations.

== See also ==
- United States Agency for International Development
