= Civil Guard (Peru) =

Gendarmerie body in Peru, 1873–1988

Civil Guard Guardia Civil
- Coat of arms
- Abbreviation: GC (Note: While the initials "GC" were chosen by the Spanish mission during its visit to Peru, Other initials were used, such as "GCP" to distinguish the Guard from its Spanish counterpart, and "BGCP", with its use starting in the 1960s and incorporating the colloquial name Benemérita.)
- Motto: El Honor es su divisa (Note: A longer version was also used: El Honor es su divisa como en la Madre Patria (Spanish: Honor is its badge as in the motherland)); Honor is its badge

Agency overview
- Formed: December 31, 1873
- Dissolved: December 6, 1988 (Note: The Givil Guard continued to operate under the name General Police (Spanish: Policía General) until its complete incorporation to the National Police of Peru in 1991.)
- Superseding agency: National Police of Peru
- Employees: 30,000 (1980)

Jurisdictional structure
- Operations jurisdiction: Peru
- General nature: Gendarmerie; Civilian police

Operational structure
- Overseen by: Ministry of the Interior

Notables
- People: Fernando Rincón Jaramillo, General; Alipio Ponce Vásquez, Captain
- Anniversary: August 30
- Award: Order of the Sun of Peru

The Civil Guard (Spanish: Guardia Civil; [ˈɡwaɾðja siˈβil]) was the main preventive police force of Peru until its dissolution in 1988. As a national gendarmerie force, it was responsible for civil policing under the authority of the Ministry of the Interior, (Note: Known as the Ministry of Government and Police (Spanish: Ministerio de Gobierno y Policía) until 1969) while investigative work was carried out by the Peruvian Investigative Police. It was also supported at times by the Republican Guard. During its dissolution process, it became known as the General Police (Spanish: Policía General) until its formal integration into the National Police of Peru in 1991. The corps is colloquially known as the benemérita (reputable).

It was modelled after the Spanish Civil Guard, which assisted in its formation.

== History ==
=== Origin ===
The origins of the Civil Guard date back to 1873, when President Manuel Pardo approved and signed two Supreme Decrees on December 31 of 1873 (published in El Peruano, the Peruvian Government's official newspaper, on January 28, 1874) and March 23, 1874, respectively, providing for its creation.

It also refers to "urban and rural stations and of the Regular Police Force divided into Gendarmerie and the Civil Guards, respectively", thus the decrees formally marked the birth of the service. That same year, Congress reported that Civil Guards units would commence their duties in every part of the nation. On November 9, 1874, President Manuel Pardo opened the Civil Guard Instruction School, whose first cadets made up a 50-men company within the Lima Infantry Gendarmerie Battalion.

=== Reorganization ===
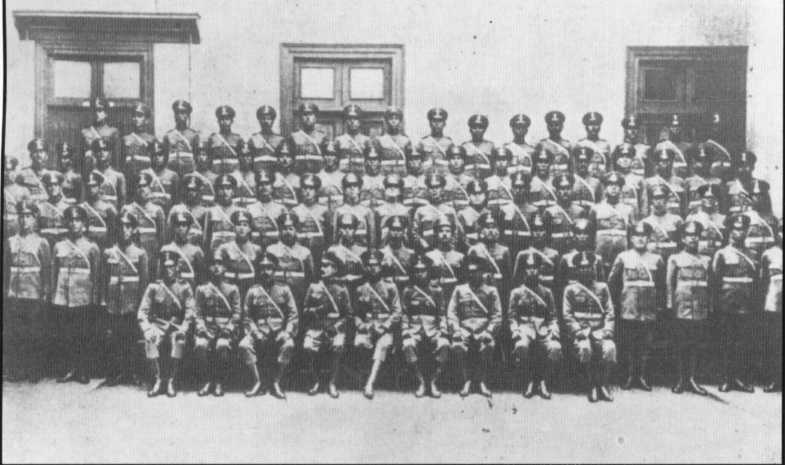
First Class of the Civil Guard Instruction School in 1923.

The Civil Guard was reorganized several times, with its first time being in 1919, under Augusto B. Leguía's administration. The purpose of the reorganization was to reinvent its public image and to modernize the unit, modelling it after its Spanish counterpart. A Spanish mission approved by King Alfonso XIII was sent to Lima with the purpose of providing full assistance in the modernization and reorganization of the police forces, working with veterans of the old Civil Guard and the remainder of what was then the National Gendarmerie. The Spanish mission was chaired by then Lieutenant Colonel Pedro Pueyo of the Spanish Civil Guard, accompanied by C.G. Captain Bernardo Sanchez Visaires and C.G. Lieutenant Adolfo Parreño Carretero, who due to illness had to return to Spain, being replaced by Lieutenant Fernando Gomez Ayau and SFC Mr José Gómez Hernández.

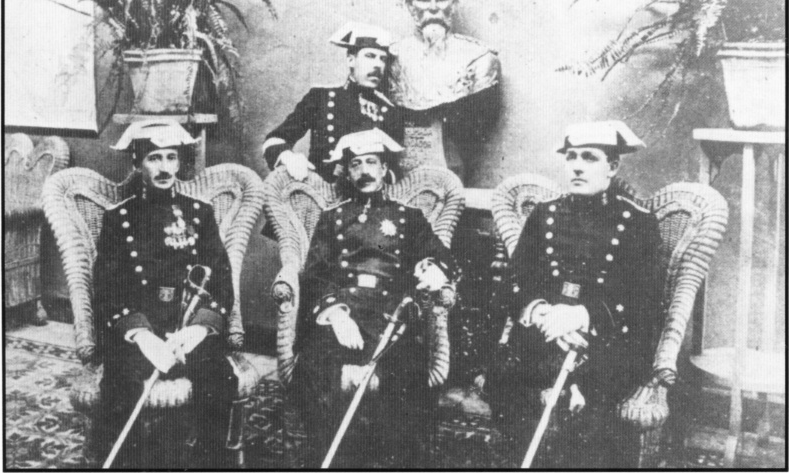
The Spanish Mission in 1923.

After arriving and having been received by the President, the mission started organizing the reform of the police forces, delivering within a month of their arrival, the documentation on January 21, 1922, having presented to President Leguía and the Minister for Police 14 bills that comprised the complete plan of reorganization of the state security forces were by then a topic of discussion in the National Congress. This study was approved no less than the President himself, who considered the plan proposed in the 14 projects mentioned, in order for the development of the national economy and to improve the security situation. As a result:

- The Civil Guard Charter for Peru was framed, similar to that used by the Spanish Civil Guard, with its 1st article stating Honor is the principal emblem of the Civil Guard, a distinction that must never be hurt, for when it is done it will never be repaired, and formalizing the proposals of the Spanish military mission to make it a uniformed, independent service away from the Armed Forces and the War Ministry and as part of the Police Ministry, but will keep its military form and traditions.
- The wartime role would be to reinforce the Armed Forces in the defense of the nation, also as stated in the Charter.
- The peacetime role would be for public security in rural communities, customs and port security, highway patrol, and border security and defense among others, also as stated in the Charter.
- The "GC" abbreviation, the same one used in Spain, will be formally adopted by the new service.

A Civil Guard instruction school was opened in 1922, also organized under the tutelage of the Spanish mission. During its inauguration ceremony, the Peruvian cry of "Viva el Perú" (Spanish: Long live Peru) was replaced by "Viva el Perú y la madre España" (Spanish: Long live Peru and the Spanish motherland).

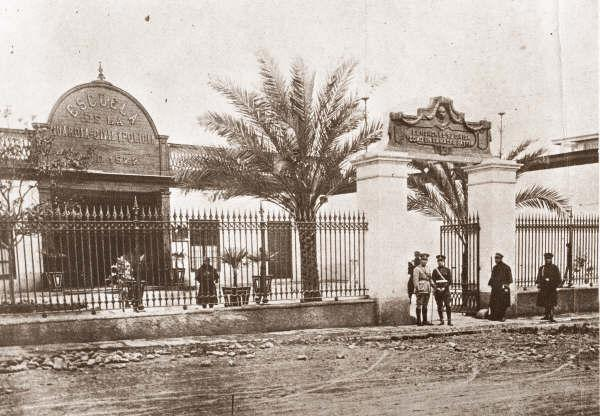
The Civil Guard Instruction School in 1923.

After the creation of the School following the Supreme Decree of July 3, 1922, there was careful recruitment of qualified personnel for the installation of the campus, getting the nomination "very honorable" and "excellent military history" for the Captains, Lieutenants and Ensigns who were to be commissioned. Class sections for security and investigation were met with great care to conduct background and education and to that extent that every cadet's qualifications were met.

The location chosen for the State Police Academy was the former Hospice of Mercy Hospital, 796 Sebastian Lorente Ibáñez Avenue (Avenue of the Incas before) in the traditional district of Cercado, which was renovated days after the decree took effect. The academy officially opened its doors on November 1 the very same year. The opening was presided over by President Leguía, together with government officials, the diplomatic corps, and military officials and attaches attending. The Spanish community of Lima also graced the event and the Spanish mission chief, LTCOL Pedro Pueyo y España, SCG, entrusted the State War Color to the academy as its director after it was blessed officially by military chaplains and handed over to the President. It was followed by the oath-taking of the first cadets of the academy. A plaque was unveiled by the presiding officers to commemorate the occasion of its formal opening, and the first Corps of Cadets performed its first march past.

As part of the opening a giant sign was made in the school entrance with the words of the Civil Guard motto, El honor es su divisa como la madre patria (Honor is its emblem with the mother country), made by no less than President Leguía himself who adapted to Peru the Spanish Civil Guard motto. Classes commenced on November 4, 1922, and its first graduation and passing out parade was held on Sept. 3, 1923, for the first of what became 59 graduating classes of officers.

The strength of the first class of graduates from the Police Academy, addressed to the Commissioners for Lima, constituted the State Security Corps and the first Corps of Cadets were made up of:

- 30 Peruvian Army Officer Cadets
- 104 Officer and NCO Cadets
- 19 Technical Cadets of the course of Investigation

=== History up until the 1970s ===
Thanks to the Spanish mission to Peru of the Spanish Civil Guard, Peru had professional civil security forces for the first time. The brand new uniforms of the Civil Guard and the Security Corps reflected the effects of that mission: While the new Civil Guard kept the kepis with their dress beige uniforms Security Corps personnel wore peaked caps with their dress and duty blue uniforms. Civil Guards were also distinguished by the very same items Peruvian Army cavalry officers used then in their uniforms while the Security Corps uniforms were modeled on those worn by European police services of the period.

Police organization in the rural and urban areas then were different from each other. Rural organization of the Civil Guard was on posts, lines, sectors, commands and regions while Security Corps' urban organization mirrored military organization save that, instead of companies, commissaries were the basic unit. The new SSC's first commisariat, the Monserrate Commissariat, was formally created.

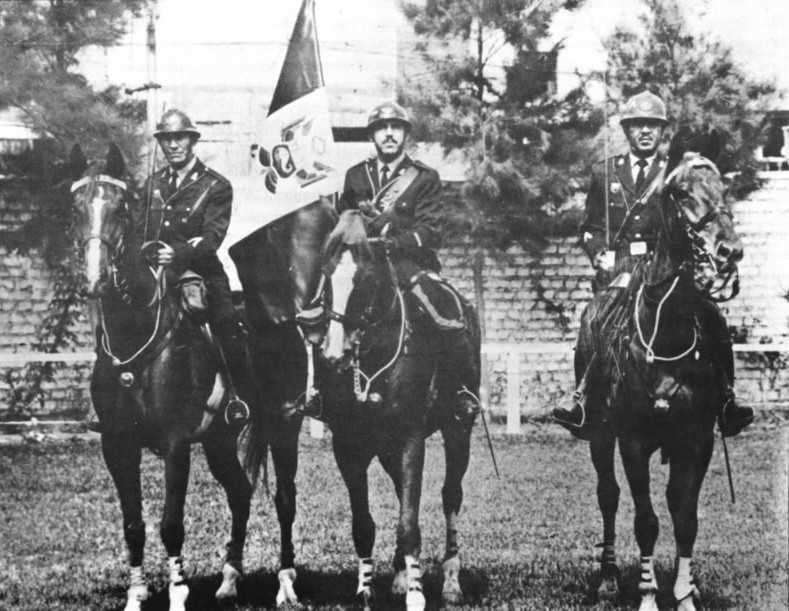
War Standard of the Mounted Police Regiment of the Civil Guard

The cavalry was formed under the name of the Cavalry Squadron of Provincial Security, which was organized on the basis of the Gendarmerie's Cavalry Squadron "Lima Guard" at the "Quinta de Presa" Barracks, one of the new mounted police units to be raised as part of the now reorganized Civil Guard. Two more were later raised, but all were disbanded in 1923 and converted to instruction squadrons in the Police Academy. The 1st Gendarme Cavalry Squadron, at the same time, became the mounted component of the 1st Combined Arms (Cavalry and Infantry) Security Regiment, and the Gendarmerie Provincial Cavalry Squadron became the Provincial Security Cavalry Squadron. On February 22, 1924, President Augusto B. Leguía, via a Supreme Resolution from the Cabinet, formally raised a Machine Gun Battalion to reinforce the ranks of the Security Corps to fulfill its mandate of public order, with Major Teodosio Alejandro Solís as its first battalion commander.

The baptism of fire for the new Security Corps came with the death of two personnel from the service on May 26, 1924, while on a routine mission in Villa de Olaya. The two who died were Guardsman Nazario Tapia and Corporal Miguel Gutarra Herrera, a member of the 1st ever graduating class of 1923.

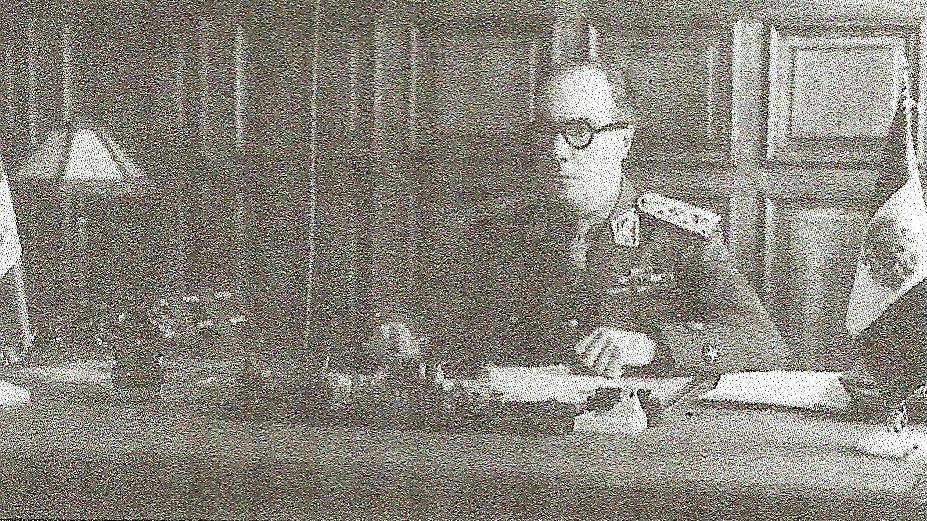
C.G. General Fernando Rincón Jaramillo as Civil Guard Director in his office next to the Plaza Italia.

The August 18, 1924 decree established the 1st Joint Command of the Civil Guard, with an Infantry Battalion, composed of two companies, and a Cavalry Squadron (formed on the basis of the former mounted police). Its duties began the same month, with its first personnel enlisted in 1925, detached from the two Civil Guards infantry companies' headquarters to the San Lazaro Barracks located at Matamoros Street, in the Rimac and the Cavalry Squadron's headquarters would be at Conchucos in the Barrios Altos, Lima, headquarters that the coming years would become the headquarters of the Cavalry Squadron of the Police and Civil Guard Guardsman's School until the end of 1965 when they moved to the Civil Guard Instruction Center (now the National Police Officer's School) Mariano Santos in the district of La Campiña, Chorrillos. The 1st Command would move to new quarters on 1644 28 July Avenue on January 16, 1937.

The Civil Guard Second Command, the customs police arm of the Civil Guard, would be raised on August 1, 1925, by virtue of a Supreme Decree. Its baptism of fire came in 1927 while fighting the forces of local rebel Eleodoro Benel Zuloeta in Cutervo Province and later while fighting warlords in Cajamarca. Due to this and other actions the Civil Guard size was increased and 3 independent companies had to be raised as a result.

A presidential decree of March 28, 1928 established August 30 every year as Police Day. Its first observance was marked by a grand parade in Lima's outskirts by all the participating units. Law No.6183 enacted on April 23, 1928, formally declared the status of the police forces, the Civil Guard included, as paramilitary units under the control and supervision of the Ministry of Government and Police with military traditions but with functions more akin to civil police services.

On January 14, 1929, the Traffic Battalion was created, a merit of Act No. 6468, to control traffic in the Capital of Peru, with Major Edilberto Salazar Castillo as its first chief. The service was started in November of that year.

Leguía reorganized the Corps of Security Forces of the Republic by virtue of Supreme Decree of March 17, 1930, with the autonomy of the role of cavalry in the Police Cavalry Squadron recognized and the Provincial Security and Lima Security Squadrons, thus by merger, became the First Cavalry Security Regt., moving the entire cavalry unit from the "Quinta de Presa" base to the Barracks "El Potao", approving Col. Rufino Manuel Martinez Martinez, CG's appointment as Head of the First Infantry Regiment of Security and appointing Lieutenant Colonel Manuel Pella Cáceda, CG, as First commander of the First Cavalry Regiment based at the Security Headquarters "El Potao."

Subsequently, the First Security Infantry Regiment, consisting of battalions, was raised, which in turn merged with the Commissioners for Lima. Then, these units were spread throughout Peru, with the names of the Security Battalions of the North, Central and South, with offices in Trujillo, Arequipa and La Oroya respectively. That same year, in 1930, the Machine Gun Battalion, mechanized that very same year, was forced to stand down.

1931 saw the Civil Guard involved in a rebellion by the 4th Army Division of the Peruvian Army led by LTCOL Agustín Cabrera in Cusco on the 26th of June. After forcing the surrender of the 4th Artillery Regiment the rebel division marched towards the CG station and the rebel leader asked the Civil Guard commander in the area, Major Humberto Flores Hidalgo to defect, but he refused, forcing the rebels to withdraw from the police station. Major Hidalgo alongside Captain Carlos Briolo forced Civil Guards units in the area to counterattack the rebel movement and worked with opponents of the movement to stop it in its tracks. The result was that most of the rebels defected and forced the capture of the rebel commander on July 6–7.

The American Popular Revolutionary Alliance's rebellion of July 7, 1932 in Trujillo, Peru surprised the services. As part of the forces responding to the revolution in that city, both the Civil Guard and the Security Corps excelled well and contributed to the victory at the cost of 36 dead and 15 wounded at the part of both services. This was the first time both services fought alongside the Peruvian Armed Forces in a joint service operation. In their honor and of all others who died while in service, a memorial cenotaph was opened in the Police and Civil Guard Academy courtyard in the following month.

With the reform of the January 5th of 1944 the Civil Guards Corps and Security Corps were merged into one body called the Peruvian Civil Guard. Under a government mandate that the service responsible for providing services in the towns and cities of the nation, the corps was divided accordingly into the Urban Civil Guard for urban municipality and city security, and the Rural Civil Guard for rural security services. The Civil Guard was by then organized into 9 police regions, each responsible for the security of their respective regions. Two years later, the ISC was formally converted into the Corps Directorate of the ISC.

Through a presidential decree of President Dr. José Luis Bustamante y Rivero on September 15, 1948, the Minister for Police Doctor Julio Cesar Villegas Cerro issued a resolution granting the autonomy and functional independence of the Investigations and Surveillance Corps (CIV) and establishing the Directorate for Investigations and Surveillance as the top command under the Ministry of Government and Police.

In 1949, President of the Republic Army Divisional General Don Manuel Apolinario Odría Amoretti elevated the Directorate of Research and Monitoring to the category of a full general Directorate, by now an autonomous unit of the Civil Guard, with its own ranks and departments, with the creation of a fiscal investigations unit done in 1950. In the same year a full police mobile unit was formed in the Civil Guard as the motorized security force under LTCOL Isaac Ingunza Apolinario, CG.

In the fall of 1956, Cadet 1st Class Teófilo Aliaga Salazar from the DC visited the Minister of Government and the Interior Dr. Jorge Fernández Stoll, about the unfair practices of the Police Academy towards its detective trainees. The fact, he stated to the Minister, was that cadet detectives were prohibited from advancing to higher ranks, only used by the Civil Guard officer cadets of the academy. By January of the next year, the situation for the detective cadets in the academy resulted in a reorganization of the Police Academy Corps of Cadets, with detective cadets now leading their own units while at the same time, plans were underway for the formation of the National Investigations Police Academy, with official sanction coming on the 20th of the same month. Another protest by the cadets, led by now Cadet Captain Salazar, that May, officially gave way to the NIPA's official opening on May 21, at the offices of the National Pedagogical Institute in Mexico Avenue, Victoria District, Lima, which would be its campus for the next 5 years. In 1977 the Civil Guard Instruction Centre welcomed its first ever woman cadets.

The revolutionary government of Juan Velasco Alvarado reached levels of discontent among the general public in the mid-1970s that reached the police. Low salaries and a particular incident where a subordinate of the Civil Guard publicly was insulted and slapped by the Head of the Military House, General Enrique Ibáñez Burga, for failing to comply with his orders of not allowing journalists to approach the President's vehicle, led to protests and strikes in the Peruvian capital. The protests later spiraled out of control, resulting in the deployment of the Peruvian Army and its violent suppression. These events became known as the Limazo, and led to even more discontent, bringing about the downfall of Alvarado's government in a coup d'état in 1980 known as the Tacnazo, organized by General Francisco Morales Bermúdez.

=== Dissolution ===
President Alan García Pérez, in his first term as chief executive (1985–1990), began on September 14 of 1985, under the law 24,294 of the Republic, as approved by Congress, the beginning of the reorganization of the police services of the Republic of Peru. On February 4, 1986, continuing with the project undertaken, legislative decrees 370, 371, 372, and 373 relating to the Organic Law of the Ministry of the Interior, the Police Forces Code of 1969 and the Organic Laws of the Civil Guard, Investigations Police and the Republican Guard were issued to the three forces. Among these, Legislative Decree No. 371, the "1986 Police Forces Act", formally laid the foundations for the definitive establishment of the National Police of Peru.

The Act established a single command (i.e. the Directorate General of Police) and also the formation of a single study center for the preparation of police officers (in the basis of Civil Guard Instruction Center "Mariano Santos" in La Campina – Chorrillos, and to be called the National Police Officer's School) and a national school for the guards and agents (referred to National Police headquarters at the former Republican Guard Superior Institute in Puente Piedra, today the National Police Technical College), directly under the Ministry of the Interior.

Law 24,949 was finally enacted on December 6 of 1988 amending the relevant articles of the Political Constitution of Peru of 1979 with the aim of the formal foundation of the National Police of Peru, and took effect the next day. The objectives sought were, among others, to integrate the three police forces to make better use of economic resources, eliminate the conflict that existed between them caused by "double role" problems and, above all, provide better services to society.

With the unification of the police forces the CG became known as the "General Police" (Spanish: Policia General) until 1991, when all 3 commands of the National Police were abolished and a single command created in its place.

== Operational history ==
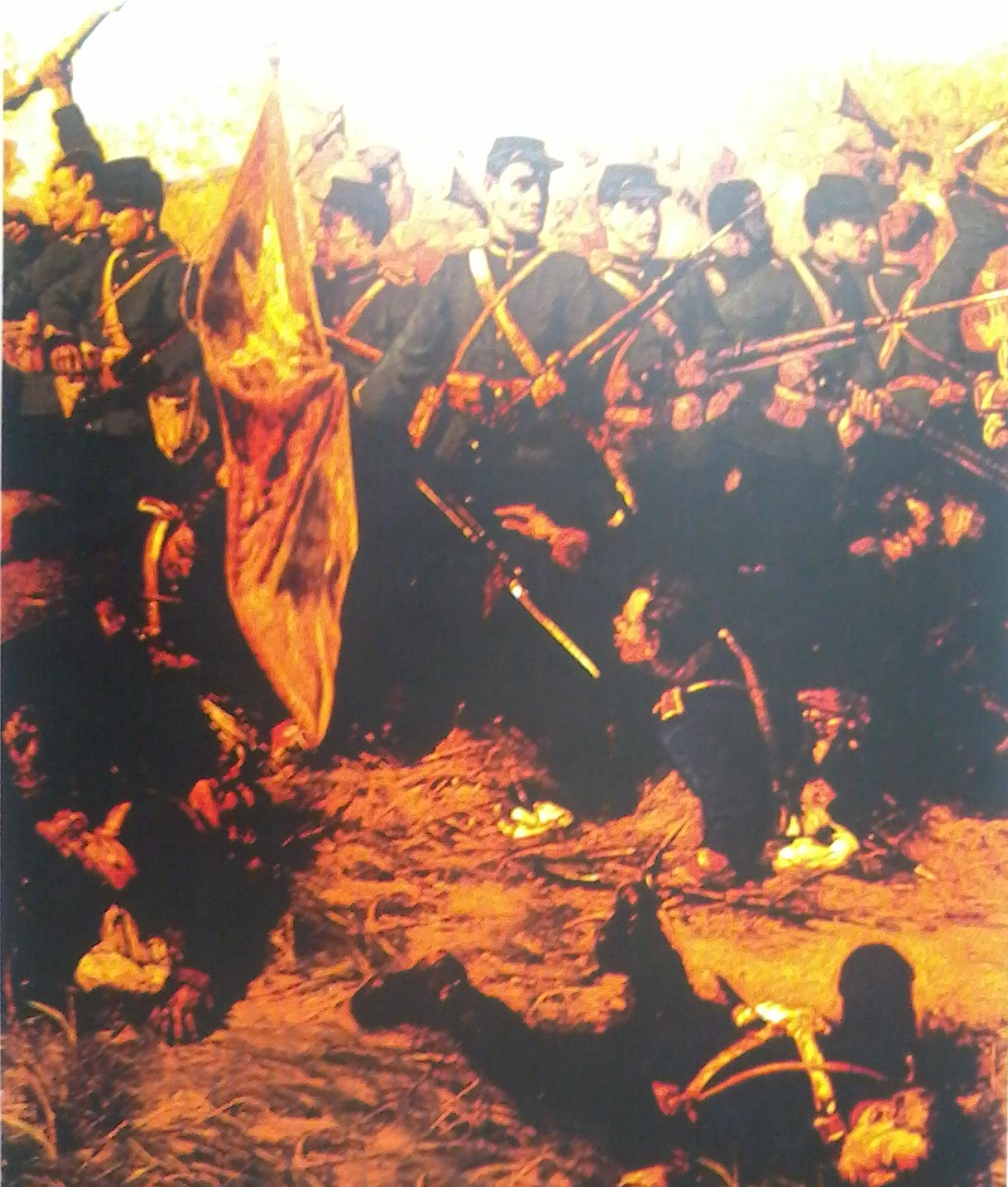
Painting of Santos Mateo holding the captured Chilean flag.

During the War of the Pacific, the Civil Guard performed alongside the Peruvian Army in all the battles of the conflict. A Civil Guard officer, Mariano Santos Mateo, was instrumental in achieving victory in the Battle of Tarapacá. He was later nicknamed El Valiente de Tarapacá as a result. At the time, he was assigned to the 25th Civil Guard Infantry Battalion "Guardias de Arequipa'", composed of 6 Civil Guard companies, and managed to capture, in the battle, the regimental flag of the 2nd Infantry Regiment of the Chilean Army. He was promoted to the next higher rank of Guards Inspector.

After hostilities broke out between Ecuador and Peru in 1941, both the Republican Guard and the Civil Guard served in the Battle of Zarumilla, integrated into the Pichincha Detachment, under the command of the Northern Army Detachment.

The 1960s saw the creation of 'Antisubversive Squadrons', which were counter-terrorist groups which saw action during a 1965 guerrilla campaign against insurgents from the Revolutionary Left Movement based in Huancavelica. The conflict once again incorporated both the Republican Guard, with its Zorro Squadron, and the Civil Guard, with its Sinchis. The conflict later became known as the Púcuta Antisubversive Campaign (Spanish: Campaña Antisubversiva de Púcuta). Horacio Patiño Cruzatti, a Civil Guard Major who was killed along with his squad by insurgents during the conflict, became a hero and a martyr to police forces.

During the Internal conflict in Peru, the Civil Guard saw itself fighting against the Shining Path on more than one occasion. Both the Republican Guard and the Civil Guard, as well as other government forces, were targets to attacks and assassinations, with 282 Civil Guard members being killed during the conflict between 1980 and 1988. The violent nature of the conflict led to atrocities and extrajudicial executions by both entities, with both claiming that those executed were terrorists.

== Regional organization ==
In 1944, the Civil Guard's regional organization was composed of 9 Regional Commands, each with a Colonel as the regional commander. Each Civil Guard Region was responsible for one or more Departamental Commands, with Region 9 serving as a metropolitan command. Each Department (save for Lima and Callao) was responsible for the Civil Guard's provincial commands.

- I Región: Tumbes and Piura.
- II Región: Lambayeque, La Libertad and Ancash.
- III Región: Junín, Huánuco and the territorial (later departamental) command of Cerro de Pasco.
- IV Región: Ayacucho and Huancavelica.
- V Región: Cusco, Puno and Apurímac.
- VI Región: Arequipa, Tacna and Moquegua.
- VII Región: Amazonas, Cajamarca and San Martín.
- VIII Región: Loreto.
- IX Región: Lima Department with supervision over rural communities of the department and the departmental commands of Callao and Ica.

In the 1950s, the territorial organization was that of 10 police regions, which in the 1960s became twelve:

- I Región: with HQ in Piura
- II Región: Trujillo
- III Región: Huancayo
- IV Región: Huánuco
- V Región: Cusco
- VI Región: Arequipa
- VII Región: Chiclayo
- VIII Región: Iquitos
- IX Región: Lima
- X Región: Callao
- XI Región: Huaraz
- XII Región: Tacna

In 1970, there were 15 regions, merged into 5 territorial commands, each organized into departmental and provincial units.

== Characteristics ==
- Its colloquial name is the benemérita (reputable), a name that continues to be used after its dissolution.
- Members of the Civil Guard enjoyed access to several entertainment faculties, including libraries and a Casino.

=== Traditions ===
==== Anthem ====
The anthem of the Civil Guard was written in 1938 by Angélica Pagaza Galdo, with lyrics by Dr. Marcial de la Puente Dianderas.

Guardias Civiles en himno de gloria,
ensalcemos la noble misión,
orgullosos de ser lo que somos,
los soldados de la abnegación,

De la madre España la noble,
Benemérita Institución,
seguiremos sus vivos ejemplos,
mantendremos su heroico blasón,

El honor ha de ser la Divisa
que ennoblezca en la lid nuestra fe
y alegre al Cuartel la sonrisa
con que vamos en pos del laurel.

El trabajo viril que fecunda
en los campos la pródiga mies
la agitada colmena en la urbe
y la aldea con su placidez.

A la Guardia Civil la proclaman
del trabajo y del orden sostén
y por eso la Patria confía
que seremos heraldos del bien.

De la Nieve, del sol y los vientos
desafiamos su duro rigor;
por cumplir nuestra santa promesa
postulado de excelso valor.

Civil Guards, in a hymn of glory
Let us praise our noble mission;
satisfied with being what we are,
the great warriors of abnegation.

From the old Spanish noble motherland's
Meritorious Institution,
we shall follow its living examples,
we shall hold up the heroic blazon.

Honor must be the badge
that ennobles our faith in the fight
and cheerful to the Barracks the smile
with which we go after the laurel.

The virile work that fertilizes
in the fields the prodigal harvest
the agitated hive in the city
and the village with its placidity.

The Civil Guard is proclaimed
of work and order support
and that is why the country trusts
that we will be heralds of good.

From the snow, from the sun and the winds
we defy its harsh rigor;
for fulfilling our holy promise
postulate of excellent value.

==== Motto ====
The motto of the Peruvian Civil Guard, Honor is its badge (Spanish: El honor es su divisa), was chosen by the Spanish mission sent to Peru in 1922, itself being an adaptation of the motto of the Spanish Civil Guard, Honor is my badge (Spanish: El honor es mi divisa). A longer version also existed: El Honor es su divisa como en la Madre Patria (Spanish: Honor is its badge as in the motherland).

==== Patronage ====
Civil Guard Captain Alipio Ponce, who died during the 1941 Ecuadorian–Peruvian War, was declared hero of the Civil Guard under Francisco Morales Bermúdez's government by Supreme Decree No. 28-78-IN of August 29, 1978 and as official patron of the Civil Guard by Supreme Resolution No. 2269-78-GC/SG of September 4, 1978.

== Ranks and titles ==
The police grades in the Civil Guard were changed several times, such as 1919. (Note: Until 1919, the ranks were as follows: Corneta (Cornet); Guardia de segunda clase (Guardsman 2nd Class); Guardia de primera clase (Guardsman 1st Class); Subinspector de Guardias (Guards Subinspector); Inspector de Guardias (Guards Inspector); Mayor de Guardias (Guards Major); Comandante de Guardias (Guards Commander); Comisario Jefe (Chief Commissioner)) In 1970, the ranks were as follows:

Commissioned Officers (Line Corps)	Commissioned Officers (Staff Corps)	Commissioned Officers (Auxiliary Corps – Armaments)	Commissioned Officers (Auxiliary Corps – Education)	English translation (Military/police rank)
Teniente General	No equivalent	No equivalent	No equivalent	Lieutenant General; Commissioner General
General	General	No equivalent	No equivalent	Major General; Commissioner
Coronel	Coronel	No equivalent	No equivalent	Colonel; Commander
Teniente Coronel	Teniente Coronel	Maestro Armero Asesor Supervisor	Professor Asesor Supervisor	Lieutenant Colonel; Chief Superintendent
Mayor	Mayor	Maestro Armero Jefe Superior	Professor Jefe	Major; Superintendent
Capitán	Capitán	Maestro Armero Jefe	Profesor de primera clase	Captain; Chief Inspector
Teniente	Teniente	Maestro Armero	Profesor de segunda clase	First Lieutenant; Senior Inspector
Alférez	No equivalent	Armero	Profesor de tercera clase	Second Lieutenant; Inspector

Non-Commissioned Officers (General Police)	Non-Commissioned Officers (Services)	English translation (Military/police rank)
Suboficial Superior	Tecnico de Primera	Sergeant Major; Station Inspector
Suboficial de Primera	Tecnico de Segunda	First Sergeant; Sub-Inspector
Suboficial de Segunda	Tecnico de Tercera	Master Sergeant
Suboficial de Tercera	Suboficial de Servicios de Primera	Sergeant First Class
Sargento Primero	Suboficial de Servicios de Segunda	Staff Sergeant; Station Sergeant
Sargento Segundo	Suboficial de Servicios de Tercera	Sergeant
Cabo	Suboficial de Servicios de Cuarta	Corporal
Guardia	Suboficial de Servicios de Quinta	Private; Constable

== See also ==
- Republican Guard (Peru)
- Peruvian Investigative Police
- National Police of Peru
- Civil Guard (Spain)

== Bibliography ==
- Album del Cincuentenario de la Guardia Civil del Perú, 1972, artículo: Breve Reseña Histórica de la Policía en el Perú . Album of the Fiftieth Anniversary of the Civil Guard of Peru, 1972, article: Brief History of the Police in Peru.
- Revista de la Guardia Civil del Perú, Año L, Nº 400, Noviembre-Diciembre 1982, folleto adjunto: La Guardia Civil del Perú (páginas desglosables) . Revista de la Guardia Civil del Peru, Year L, No. 400, November–December 1982, attached brochure: The Guardia Civil del Peru (pages broken down).
- Revista de la Guardia Civil del Perú, Año LVI, Nº 434, Noviembre-Diciembre 1988, artículo: Historia de la Guardia Civil del Perú refleja abnegación, sacrificio, patriotismo y heroicidad a la patria ya la sociedad, que la cubre de gloria e inmortalidad, páginas 10–20 . Revista de la Guardia Civil del Perú, Año LVI, No. 434, November–December 1988 article: History of the Guardia Civil of Peru reflects dedication, sacrifice, heroism and patriotism to the nation and society, which covers the glory and immortality, pages 10–20.
