= Republican Guard (Peru) =

Republican Guard of Peru
- Guardia Republicana del Perú
- Founded: August 7, 1919
- Disbanded: November 25, 1988 (Note: The Republican Guard continued to operate under the name Security Police (Policía de Seguridad) until its complete incorporation to the National Police of Peru in 1991.)
- Country: Peru
- Allegiance: President of Peru
- Branch: National Gendarmerie of Peru
- Type: Republican guard
- Size: 5,000 (c. 1980s)
- Patron: Crucified Lord of Rimac
- Mottos: Honor, Lealtad y Disciplina
- Anniversaries: 7 August
- Engagements: Ecuadorian–Peruvian War; 1932 Trujillo uprising Limazo; Internal conflict in Peru

The Republican Guard of Peru (Spanish: Guardia Republicana del Perú) was a branch of the Peruvian National Gendarmerie responsible for providing security to the headquarters of public institutions and penitentiary establishments, as well as border control.

== Formation ==
The Republican Guard originally started as an infantry regiment of the Peruvian National Gendarmerie, founded in 1852 under the government of José Rufino Echenique as part of a reorganization of the police forces at the time. It became the 1st Gendarmes de Infantería Battalion (Batallón de Gendarmes de Infantería N.º 1) in 1862, later fighting in the War of the Pacific.

In 1855, president Ramón Castilla reorganized the Gendarmerie, consolidating the existing police forces into it and establishing strict entry requirements, as well as increasing their numbers. The following year, continuing with the reorganization of the Gendarmerie, Castilla issues the Decree of April 7, 1856, which divided the Gendarmerie into two battalions based in Lima: with headquarters at the “Sacramentos de Santa Ana” Barracks, located in the street of the same name and next to Plaza Italia, in Barrios Altos (now the campus of the "Heroes of Cenepa" Elementary School), and secondary headquarters in Rímac District. The decree states:

The police and security forces that exist today, will meet in a single one with the name of Gendarmes it will be used exclusively to maintain public safety; It will consist of two regiments, one infantry and one cavalry, the first consisting of two battalions and the second four squadrons.

An 1873 decree by president Manuel Pardo once again reorganized the police forces of the country, creating, among other entities, the Prison Guard (Guardia de Cárceles), located in each regional capital.

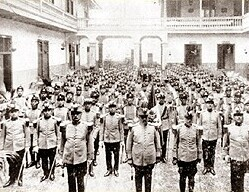
1st Gendarmes de Infantería Battalion in its Barrios Altos barracks

It would be only in 1919 when the 1st Gendarme Battalion became the 1st Gendarme Battalion "Republican Guard" (Batallón de Gendarmes de Infantería "Guardia Republicana" N.º 1), upon the recommendations of then President Augusto Leguía, at the suggestion of the Peruvian Army General Gerardo Alvarez, who during a visit to Paris, France, saw the French Republican Guard and–inspired by its long history and its mission to guard government institutions and the presidency–advised that it was due time that Peru adopted its example. A Supreme Decree for this purpose was enacted on August 7 that same year. With Florentino Bustamante, a former NCO, as its first commanding officer till 1923, the Guard Battalion's mandate was to ensure security in all buildings of the national government especially "the security of the Government Palace and the National Congress", as stated in the decree that raised it. It later became a full regiment.

In 1931, the Republican Guard Regiment was transformed into the 2nd Infantry Regiment of Security, in a failed effort to begin the unification of the national police services following the Chilean example. It reverted to its former name later that year by the orders of President David Samanez Ocampo, and formally reorganized once more and stripped of its State Color.

The regiment would be reformed in 1932, with a new motto: "Honor, Loyalty, Discipline", by now commanded by Colonel Enrique Herbozo Méndez. After the assassination of President Luis Miguel Sánchez Cerro on April 30, 1933, the regiment remained as the presidential guard for several more years. The reorganized Regiment's strength was a regimental headquarters unit, service battalion and 2 battalions, the latter two composed of 3 rifle companies each plus a machine gun platoon and the regimental band and Corps of drums.

In 1935 the Guard's role was expanded, through the enactment by the National Congress of the Republican Guard Organic Law, signed that same year by President Óscar R. Benavides. It was now in charge of patrolling the land borders, security of prisons, security of private and public places of national importance, and to assist in maintaining peace and order and national security as a whole, as well as contributing to the efforts of the armed forces during wartime.

== Operational history ==
=== Ecuadorian–Peruvian War ===
After hostilities broke out between Ecuador and Peru in 1941, the Republican Guard Regiment participated with 2 infantry companies of 140 men each, which, from May 24, 1941, formed the front between Canchis and Chinchipe, remaining even after hostilities ceased, until June 1942. During the conflict, both the Republican Guard and the Civil Guard served in the Battle of Zarumilla, integrated into the Pichincha Detachment, under the command of the Northern Army Detachment.

=== 1965 Antisubversive Campaign ===
The 1960s saw the creation of 'Antisubversive Squadrons', which were counter-terrorist groups which saw action during a 1965 guerrilla campaign against insurgents from the Revolutionary Left Movement based in Huancavelica. The conflict once again incorporated both the Republican Guard, with its Zorro Squadron, and the Civil Guard. The conflict later became known as the Púcuta Antisubversive Campaign (Spanish: Campaña Antisubversiva de Púcuta). Horacio Patiño Cruzatti, a Civil Guard Major who was killed along with his squad by insurgents during the conflict, became a hero and a martyr to police forces.

=== Internal conflict in Peru ===
During the Internal conflict in Peru, the Republican Guard saw itself fighting against the Shining Path on more than one occasion. Both the Republican Guard and the Civil Guard, as well as other government forces, were targets to attacks and assassinations, with 116 Republican Guard members being killed during the conflict between 1980 and 1988. The violent nature of the conflict led to atrocities and extrajudicial executions, with the Republican Guard claiming that those executed were terrorists.

== Later history and dissolution ==
Entrance into the Guard was voluntary and by the 1980s it numbered over 5,000 men. It was equipped with light infantry weapons, mostly carbines and submachine guns, and riot gear. A Parachute squadron was formed in 1963. For most of its existence, the Guard recruited directly from the Peruvian Army and lacked its own training facilities, but then in 1973, it opened a Superior School for senior officer training. The Republican Guard Instruction Center was opened in 1977 and it was responsible for the training of all Guardsmen. It later absorbed the Superior School. Only in 1959 and again from 1974 onward that the Guard had its very own commanding general.

The Republican Guard became the Security Police (PS) in 1986, during the police reorganization. It continued to have responsibility for border control, custody of the prisons, and guarding significant government buildings. The PS grew the most rapidly of all the police forces in the 1980s; from 6,450 in 1980 to 21,484 in 1986. Some 20 percent of the force was detailed to prison duty, with a large portion of the rest distributed among public buildings and 177 border stations. Budget difficulties have delayed the opening of more border control stations. The growing drug-trafficking problem across Peru's borders, particularly with Colombia and Brazil, provided the PS with additional challenges. The additional border posts were envisioned as one way to respond because most were proposed for areas where drug trafficking was believed to be concentrated. However, the growing prison population during the 1980s posed more difficulties for the PS; many had to do with the prisoners accused and/or convicted of terrorism.

On December 6, 1988, under president Alan García's government, Law N° 24949 was published, creating the National Police of Peru (PNP). It became effective on December 25 of the same year, officially ending the Republican Guard. In 1991, the Security Police became a part of the National Police of Peru in compliance with national security laws.

== Issues ==
In December 1989, two police officers were found guilty of abuses in the prison massacre by a Court of Military Justice and were sentenced to prison terms. The other sixty-nine police members and six army officers accused were acquitted, but in June 1990 the not-guilty verdicts of eight of the police officers were overturned in a Military Appeals Court. One officer was sentenced to one month in jail, the other seven to six months.

== See also ==
- Republican guard
- Civil Guard (Peru)
- Peruvian Investigative Police
