= Peruvian Investigative Police =

- Policía de Investigaciones del Perú
- Founded: October 12, 1922
- Disbanded: November 25, 1988 (Note: The Investigative Police continued to operate under the name Technical Police (Spanish: Policía Técnica) until its complete incorporation to the National Police of Peru in 1991.)
- Country: Peru
- Allegiance: President of Peru
- Type: Security Corps
- Anniversaries: 15 September

The Peruvian Investigative Police (Spanish: Policía de Investigaciones del Perú, PIP) was a Peruvian plainclothes police unit, similar to the United States Federal Bureau of Investigation (FBI), which was meant to investigate crimes, gather intelligence, and fight subversion. In 1988, the PIP was merged into the National Police of Peru, along with two other police forces, the Guardia Civil (GC) and the Guardia Republicana (GR), all three of which were under the direction of the Ministry of Interior.

== History ==
Until the 20th century, investigative duties were performed by a number of police organizations in Peru, including the Lima Police, Civil Guard and the National Gendarmerie, as well as select senior NCOs of the Peruvian Army. The Lima Police's investigative section traces its origins to 1882, becoming one of the first city police forces to form an investigative section in South America at that time.

=== Creation ===
On August 7, 1919, President Augusto Bernardino Leguía Salcedo enacted Legislative Decree No. 1163 which began the reorganization of the police services. Among others the decree granted the wishes of many officers for a separate academy for the education and training of law enforcement officers. To fulfil this mission the President sent a request to HM King Alfonso XIII of Spain to send Spanish Civil Guard officers for the police reorganization plan and the creation of the long awaited police academy and later created a reorganization mission through a Supreme Resolution dated April 4, 1921. The training mission was led by Lieutenant Colonel Pedro Pueyo, SCG, and on January 21, 1922, the training mission staff presented their 14 bills to the President and the Minister of Government, one of them concerning the future officer school and the long-awaited separate unit for investigative work. Formerly these officer cadets of the Civil Guard, the Security Corps, and the soon to be created Investigation and Surveillance Brigade shared the same academy as the officer cadets of the Peruvian Army: the Chorrillos Military School, and shared the same reporting ministry in the War Ministry, not in the Government and Police Ministry, as well as the military tradition and rank system as part of the Peruvian Armed Forces, while the CGIC was only limited to other ranks as well as being the post graduate specialty school for the officers.

On July 2 the same year, President Leguía officially created through Supreme Decree the "School of the Civil Guard and the Police of the Republic", and formally laid the groundwork for the future creation of a national investigations service. The said school, alongside training future detective officers, had a separate section set for NCOs and agents of investigative policing with a fingerprinting section attached as per the recommendations made by the Civil Guard mission. The new academy, opened on November 1, had 30 cadets of the investigation course and a number of investigation officer cadets wearing Civil Guard and Security Corps uniforms.

On October 12, 1922, the long awaited day came when President Leguía created what was then the Investigation and Surveillance Brigade (ISB) (Brigada de Investigación y Vigilancia, BIV), organized into the following:

- Presidential Section
- Foreigners Police
- Investigative Operations and Detection Section
- Fingerprinting Section

The ISB, under the overall command of the Inspector General of Police, a general-ranked officer, was under a Technical Inspector. For all effects and purposes the ISB was a separate investigative section under the full responsibility of the Civil Guard which also served the needs of the also newly created Security Corps.

=== Growth ===
On March 12, 1924, a Ministerial Resolution by the Ministry of Government and Police officially adopted the fingerprinting system invented by Federico Olóriz Aguilera in Spain for use by the ISB.

On August 26, 1929, the ISB was upgraded into the Investigation and Surveillance Corps (ISC).

In 1933, the Technical Police Laboratories in Lima were opened in the presence of President Oscar R. Benavides, giving the ISC a modern and up to date facility for investigative work. 4 years later, the Lima Criminological Laboratories opened its doors. In 1938, the NCO Cadet Course (Investigation) of the Police Academy was opened with an initial makeup of 100 NCO cadets and basic training agents.

To better supervise the ISC, the Directorate for Investigation was created in 1946. Under President José Luis Bustamante it had its organic law updated in 1948 to catch up with the changing trends in investigative work. His successor, President General Manuel Arturo Odría, upgraded it to a Directorate General in the Civil Guard organization.

== Ranks and insignia ==
=== Officer corps ===
Commissioned Officers (1923-1928)	Commissioned Officers (1929-1958)	Commissioned Officers (1959-1969)	Commissioned Officers (1969-1980)	Commissioned Officers (1980-1988)	English translation (Military/police rank)
No equivalent	No equivalent	Inspector General Mayor	Inspector General	Teniente General	Lieutenant General (IP); Commissioner General
No equivalent	No equivalent	Inspector General Superior	Inspector Mayor	General	Major General (IP); Commissioner
No equivalent	Inspector General	Inspector General	Inspector Superior	Coronel	Colonel; Detective Commander
Inspector	Sub-Inspector	Sub-Inspector	Inspector	Comandante	Lieutenant Colonel; Detective Chief Superintendent
Sub-Inspector	Comisario	Comisario	Comisario Superior	Mayor	Major; Detective Superintendent
Oficial Primero	Oficial Primero	Oficial Primero	Comisario Primero	Capitan	Captain; Detective Chief Inspector
Oficial Segundo	Oficial Segundo	Oficial Segundo	Comisario Segundo	Teniente	First Lieutenant; Detective Senior Inspector
Vigilante	Vigilante	Vigilante	Sub-Comisario	Alferez	Second Lieutenant; Detective Inspector

=== Other ranks ===
Non-Commissioned Officers (1938-1959)	Non-Commissioned Officers (1959-1969)	Non-Commissioned Officers (1969-1980)	Non-Commissioned Officers (until 1988)	English translation (Police rank)
No equivalent	Brigadier	Brigadier Tecnico	Suboficial Superior	Detective Station Inspector
No equivalent	Brigadier de Primera	Brigadier de Primera	Suboficial de Primera	Detective Sub-Inspector
No equivalent	Brigadier de Segunda	Brigadier de Segunda	Suboficial de Segunda	Detective Master Sergeant
Brigadier de Primera	Brigadier de Tercera	Brigadier de Tercera	Suboficial de Tercera	Detective Sergeant First Class
Brigadier de Segunda	Brigadier de Cuarta	Vigilante de Primera	Sargento Primero	Detective Station Sergeant
Auxiliar de Primera	Auxiliar de Primera	Vigilante de Segunda	Sargento Segundo	Detective Sergeant
Auxiliar de Segunda	Auxiliar de Segunda	Vigilante de Tercera	Cabo	Detective Corporal
Auxiliar de Tercera	Auxiliar de Tercera	Vigilante de Cuarta	Agente	Agent; Detective

== See also ==
- UMOPAR
- War on drugs
- Andean Information Network
- Narco News
- National Police of Peru
- Republican Guard (Peru)
- Civil Guard (Peru)

== Further sources ==
- UNHCR Refworld search for "Peru PIP"
- Google Book searches for:
  - Peruvian Investigative Police
  - Policía de Investigaciones del Perú
  - PIP Police Peru
