= National Police of Peru =

National Police of Peru Policía Nacional del Perú
- Coat of arms
- Abbreviation: PNP
- Motto: Dios, Patria, Ley; God, Fatherland, Law

Agency overview
- Formed: December 6, 1988
- Preceding agencies: Civil Guard; Investigative Police; Republican Guard
- Employees: 130,000
- Annual budget: S/. 8.1 billion 2009

Jurisdictional structure
- National agency: Peru
- Operations jurisdiction: Peru
- Area: 1,285,220 km² (496,222 mi²)
- Population: 29,132,013 June 2009
- Governing body: Ministry of the Interior
- General nature: Civilian police

Operational structure
- Headquarters: Yes
- Elected officer responsible: Vicente Tiburcio, Minister of Interior
- Agency executive: Oscar Arriola Delgado, General Commander

Facilities
- Airbases: Jorge Chávez International Airport
- Airplanes: 11
- Helicopters: 26

Notables
- Anniversary: December 6

Website
- pnp.gob.pe

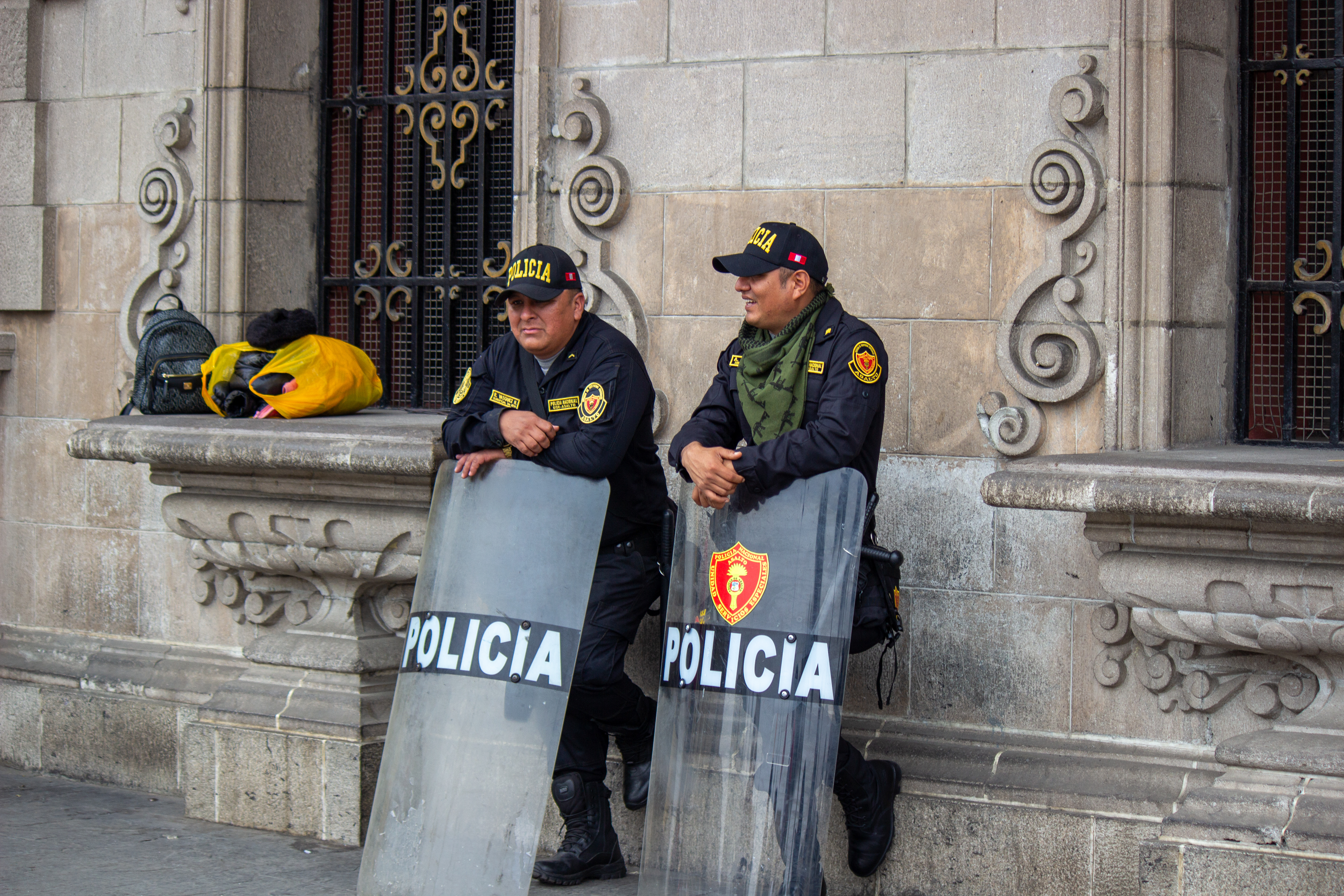
Police at the Government Palace in the capital Lima

The National Police of Peru (Spanish: Policía Nacional del Perú, PNP) is the national police force of Peru. Its jurisdiction covers the nation's land, sea, and air territories. Formed from the merger of the Investigative Police, the Civil Guard, and the Republican Guard in 1988, it is one of the largest police forces in Latin America. Its mission is to preserve domestic order, public order and national security, in order to enforce the law and protect the people of Peru. The PNP is controlled by the Ministry of the Interior. The PNP has a number of divisions, tasked with enforcing specific aspects of the law; among the more well known are DIROES (Special Operations), DIRANDRO (Anti-Narcotics Unit), DIRINCRI (Criminal Investigations), and DIRCOTE (Anti-Terrorism).

== History ==
After the proclamation of Independence of Peru in 1821 by José de San Martín, the Civic Guard and the Civic Militia were created, with José Bernardo de Tagle as Inspector General. In a decree issued on 7 January 1825, Simón Bolívar established a National Militia. This National Guard, formed on the basis of discharged personnel from the army and organized under a military system, also constituted the reserve of the Army of Peru and was part of the armed forces.

In 1845, Ramón Castilla, during his first government, reorganized the National Guard, distributing it in all departments, issued new rules and regulations aimed at delimiting the functions of the Political authorities and the General Inspection of the aforementioned Force. In 1852, José Rufino Echenique reorganized the Police Forces into a single Corps and created the National Gendarmerie of Peru.

In 1855, Castilla began his second government by proceeding to reorganize the Gendarmerie, merging the existing Police Corps into it, establishing strict entry requirements and increasing its number. Manuel Pardo y Lavalle assumed the presidency on August 2, 1872, with one of his first actions being the reorganization of the Police Forces, establishing the Civil Guard. The formation of this old police force lasted until 1919, where it was again reorganized under Augusto B. Leguía's second government through two supreme decrees issued on August 7, 1919.

Leguía, at the suggestion of General Gerardo Álvarez, ordered, emulating the French Republican Guard, that the Infantry Gendarmes Battalion No. 1 be called Peruvian Republican Guard Infantry Gendarmes Battalion No. 1, giving it the mission of security of the Government Palace and the National Congress. On September 15, 1948, José Luis Bustamante y Rivero granted autonomy to the Investigation and Surveillance Corps and on June 3, 1960, it changed its name to the Investigative Police. From that period on, the three security forces in the country were the Civil Guard, the Investigative Police and the Republican Guard.

=== Creation ===
During Alan García's first presidency, the 1986 Police Forces Act was signed, which formally laid the foundations for the definitive establishment of a new National Police. The Act established a single command (i.e. the Directorate General of Police) and also the formation of a single study center for the preparation of police officers (in the basis of Civil Guard Instruction Center "Mariano Santos" in La Campina – Chorrillos, and to be called the National Police Officer's School) and a national school for the guards and agents (referred to National Police headquarters at the former Republican Guard Superior Institute in Puente Piedra, today the National Police Technical College), directly under the Ministry of the Interior.

Law 24949 was finally enacted on December 6, 1988, amending the relevant articles of the 1979 Constitution of Peru with the aim of the formal foundation of the National Police of Peru, and took effect the next day. The objectives sought were, among others, to integrate the three police forces to make better use of economic resources, eliminate the conflict that existed between them caused by "double role" problems and, above all, provide better services to society.

With the unification of the police forces the Civil Guard became known as the "General Police" (Spanish: Policia General), the Republican Guard became the "Security Police" (Spanish: Policía de Seguridad) and the Investigative Police became the "Technical Police" (Spanish: Policía Técnica) until 1991, when all 3 commands of the National Police were abolished and a single command created in its place.

After the creation of the National Police, Saint Rose of Lima was designated, by Supreme Decree No. 0027-89-IN, published on September 18, 1989, as its patron saint. In 1995, Saint Rose of Lima was decorated with the Order of Merit of the National Police in the degree of Grand Cross and was also awarded the Honorary Band of General of the National Police of Peru, in her capacity as Patron of the institute. In the Annual Calendar of Institutional Festivities of the National Police, August 30 of each year was designated as the Day of Saint Rose of Lima and Police Virtue, in accordance with the provisions of Supreme Decree No. 0027-89 and directorial resolution No. 355092 of August 6, 1992.

=== Recent history ===
Recently, the National Police of Peru has experienced 28 years of war against terrorism and drug trafficking and has more than 140,000 troops. The PNP is one of the largest police forces in Latin America, with large land, air and water units as well as special forces and commandos assigned to locations all over the country particularly with the formation of their Tactical Action Sub-Unit (Sub-Unidad de Acción Táctica) or SUAT. However, the PNP is plagued by corruption.

In 2022, allegations of widespread corruption under General Commander Javier Gallardo – including reports of bribes involving tens of thousands of dollars for rank promotions and payments for more relaxed positions – led to institutional instability in the government of President Pedro Castillo suggestions by the president's prime minister Mirtha Vásquez resulted with General Gallardo being fired on 14 January 2022. PNP officials believed that the leadership of Gallardo would damage the institution of the police force and sided with Minister of the Interior Avelino Guillén, who ordered his firing. General Gallardo attempted to stay in his position, though he later retired. On 27 December 2022, Gallardo was arrested for his alleged involvement of paid promotions of PNP officers.

== Functions ==
Under the 1988 National Police Act and subsequent legislative acts of Congress, the National Police has the following functions:

1. Maintaining security and public order and protect human rights.
2. Prevent, combat, investigate and report crimes.
3. Ensure public safety.
4. Provide protection to children, adolescents, the elderly and women who are at risk of their freedom.
5. Investigate the disappearance of individuals.
6. Ensure and control vehicular and pedestrian free movement on the public roads and secure vehicle and rail transport, to investigate and report accidents, and keep records of vehicles for law enforcement, in coordination with the responsible authority.
7. Intervene in the air, sea, river and lake transportation in their actions.
8. Monitor and control the borders and enforce the laws on migratory control of nationals and foreigners.
9. Providing security to the President of the Republic, the Heads of State on an official visit, the Prime Minister, and the autonomous constitutional bodies, deputies of Congress, Ministers of State, as well as diplomats, dignitaries and other persons authorized by Law.
10. Comply with the Judiciary, the Constitutional Court, National Elections Board, the Public Ministry and the National Electoral Office in exercising its functions.
11. Participate in prison security, as well as the transfer of the accused and sentenced.
12. Participate in the compliance of the provisions relating to the protection and conservation of natural resources and the environment, and the safety of Peruvian archaeological and cultural heritage.
13. Ensuring the safety of goods and services, in coordination with relevant state bodies.
14. Participate in National Defense, Civil Defense and the economic and social development of the country.
15. Carry out the identification of persons for law enforcement purposes.
16. Exercise such other functions as provided for in the Constitution and relevant laws of the Republic of Peru.

== Ranks ==
Commissioned officer ranks

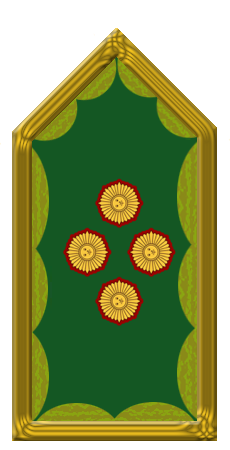
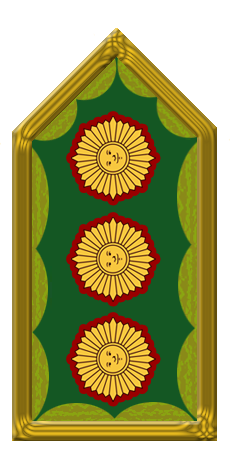
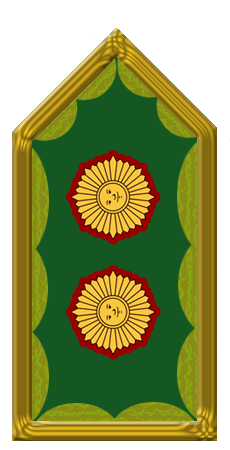
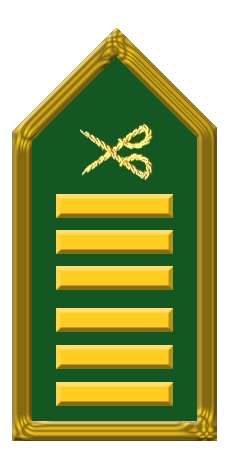
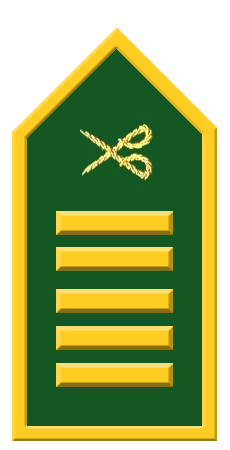
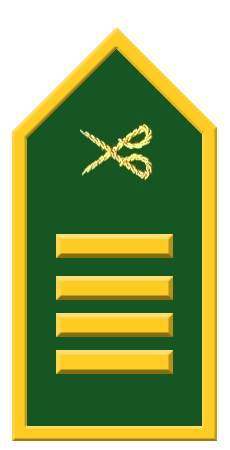
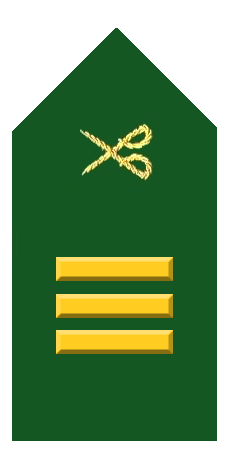
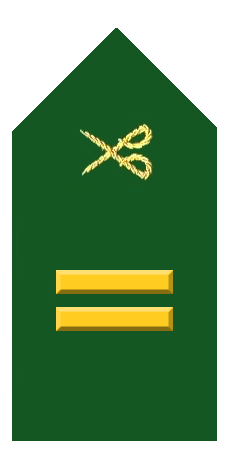
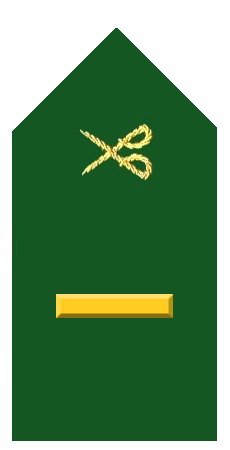
Rank group	General / flag officers			Senior officers			Junior officers
National Police of Peru
National Police of Peru	General de policía	Teniente general	General	Coronel	Comandante	Mayor	Capitán	Teniente	Alférez

Other ranks

The rank insignia of non-commissioned officers and enlisted personnel.

Rank group	Senior NCOs			Junior NCOs	Enlisted
National Police of Peru
National Police of Peru	Suboficial primero	Suboficial segundo	Suboficial tercero

Technician ranks

Rank group	Warrant officers
National Police of Peru
National Police of Peru	Suboficial Técnico Superior	Suboficial Técnico Brigadier	Suboficial Técnico Primero	Suboficial Técnico Segundo	Suboficial Técnico Tercero

== See also ==
- Law enforcement in Peru
- Crime in Peru

== Bibliography ==
- Album del Cincuentenario de la Guardia Civil del Perú, 1972, artículo: Breve Reseña Histórica de la Policía en el Perú, página 13 . Album of the Fiftieth Anniversary of the Civil Guard of Peru, 1972, article: Brief History of the Police in Peru, page 13.
- Revista de la Guardia Civil del Perú, Año L, Nº 400, Noviembre-Diciembre de 1982, folleto adjunto: La Guardia Civil del Perú (páginas desglosables) . Revista de la Guardia Civil del Perú, Año L, No. 400, November–December 1982, attached brochure: The Guardia Civil of Peru (pages broken down).
- Revista de la Guardia Civil del Perú, Año LVI, Nº 434, Noviembre-Diciembre de 1988, artículo: Historia de la Guardia Civil del Perú refleja abnegación, sacrificio, patriotismo y heroicidad a la patria ya la sociedad, que la cubre de gloria e inmortalidad, páginas 10–20 . Revista de la Guardia Civil del Perú, Año LVI, No. 434, November–December 1988 article: History of the Guardia Civil of Peru reflects dedication, sacrifice, heroism and patriotism to the nation and society, which covers the glory and immortality, pages 10–20.
- Revista de la Policía Nacional del Perú, Año 3, Nº 12, Agosto de 1991, artículo: Proceso histórico de la PNP a través de las Constituciones del Perú por el Coronel PNP Carlos Orbegoso Rojas, páginas 64–65 . Journal of the National Police of Peru, Year 3, No. 12, August 1991, article: Historical process of the PNP through the constitution of Peru by Colonel PNP Orbegoso Carlos Rojas, pages 64–65.
- Revista de la Policía Nacional del Perú, Año 8, Nº 56, Diciembre de 1996, artículo: Una gloriosa historia policial. Journal of the National Police of Peru, Year 8, No. 56, December 1996 article: A glorious history of policing. Nota histórica sobre la existencia de la policía en el Perú, páginas 6–9 . Historical note on the existence of the police in Peru, pages 6–9.
- Revista de la Policía Nacional del Perú, Año 14, Nº 81, Enero-Febrero–Marzo de 2002, artículo: Caballeros de la ley, Custodios de la paz, Primera Parte, páginas 69–83 . Journal of the National Police of Peru, Year 14, No. 81, January–February–March 2002, article: Knights of the Act, the Guardians of Peace, Part One, pages 69–83.
- Revista de la Policía Nacional del Perú, Año 14, Nº 82, Abril-Mayo–Junio de 2002, artículo: Caballeros de la ley, Custodios de la paz, Parte Final, páginas 67–83 . Journal of the National Police of Peru, Year 14, No. 82, April–May–June 2002 article: Knights of the law, custody of the peace, part, pages 67–83.
