= Ernesto Aramburú =

Peruvian architect (1920–2010)

Mayor of Miraflores
- In office 1970–1976
- Preceded by: Rafael Sánchez Aizcorbe
- Succeeded by: Santos Hinostroza

Personal details
- Born: August 26, 1920 Lima, Peru
- Died: May 2, 2010 (aged 89) Miraflores, Peru
- Resting place: Jardines de la Paz
- Parent(s): Andrés Aramburú Salinas; Emilia Menchaca Figari
- Education: Colegio La Salle; National University of Engineering
- Occupation: Architect
- Known for: Costa Verde
- Affiliations: Club Nacional

Ernesto Aramburú Menchaca (August 26, 1920 — May 2, 2010) was a Peruvian architect who served as mayor of Miraflores from 1970 to 1976. He directed the construction projects in several districts of the city, among which the Paseo de la República Avenue and the Costa Verde—a highway designed by him that spans the entirety of Lima's southwestern coast—stands out.

== Biography ==
Aramburú was born in Lima on August 26, 1920, to parents Andrés Avelino Aramburú Salinas and Emilia Menchaca Figari. His paternal grandfather was journalist and politician Andrés Aramburú Sarrio. He was the seventh of eight children. His brother Javier would later serve as a lawyer, sportsman and head of the Lima Bar Association.

He studied at La Salle School, after which he studied at the National University of Engineering, graduating as an engineer-architect in 1943. In the private sector, he worked at the urban development projects of Canto Grande and Huachipa, also designing the headquarters and transmission towers for Channel 4 in 1958 and Channel 5 in 1959. He was awarded for his work designing and building residential and commercial buildings, as well as churches.

In the public sector, he directed projects of the Metropolitan Municipality of Lima in Miraflores District, Lima, Jesús María, and Pueblo Libre. He worked as the Municipality's Inspector of Public Works in the 1950s. He conceived the original project for the Paseo de la República expressway, whose first part's construction—which he headed—began in 1966, and concluded in 1967, when it was inaugurated by Luis Bedoya Reyes.

He headed the construction of Santa Rosa and Ricardo Palma bridges, built between 1956 and 1962 to bridge the gap between the districts of Lima and Rímac, which he called a "wound" (referring to the Rímac River). He also worked at the satellite cities in Ventanilla, Puente Piedra and Vitarte, also built during this period. In addition to the above, he also planned underground paths underneath Tacna and Abancay avenues, which were never built.

Aramburú worked in coastal defence and beach habilitation projects in the city, which included the first studies for what would become the Costa Verde, a 1968 urban and tourism development project and his best known work, for which former president of Peru Fernando Belaunde Terry called him the "Father of the Costa Verde" (Padre de la Costa Verde). He served as mayor of Miraflores in the 1970s. He was inducted into the Roll of Honour of the Society of Engineers on September 10, 1996.

Aramburú died at his house in Miraflores in the early hours of May 2, 2010. He was buried at Jardines de la Paz Cemetery in La Molina.

== Awards and recognitions ==
- Order of Merit of the National Police of Peru (1966)
- Grand Officer of the Order of the Sun of Peru (1985)
