= Costa Verde =

Costa Verde may refer to:

== Places ==
- Costa Verde (Brazil), in southern Brazil
- Costa Verde (Peru), in western Peru
  - Costa Verde (highway), a highway that runs alongside the region
- Costa Verde (Portugal), in northwestern Portugal
- Costa Verde (Sardinia), in Italy
- Costa Verde (Spain), an area around Llanes

== Other uses ==
- Costa Verde, a fictitious country in Central America from the XIII universe.
