= Costa Verde (highway) =

Highway in Lima, Peru

- Circuito de Playas
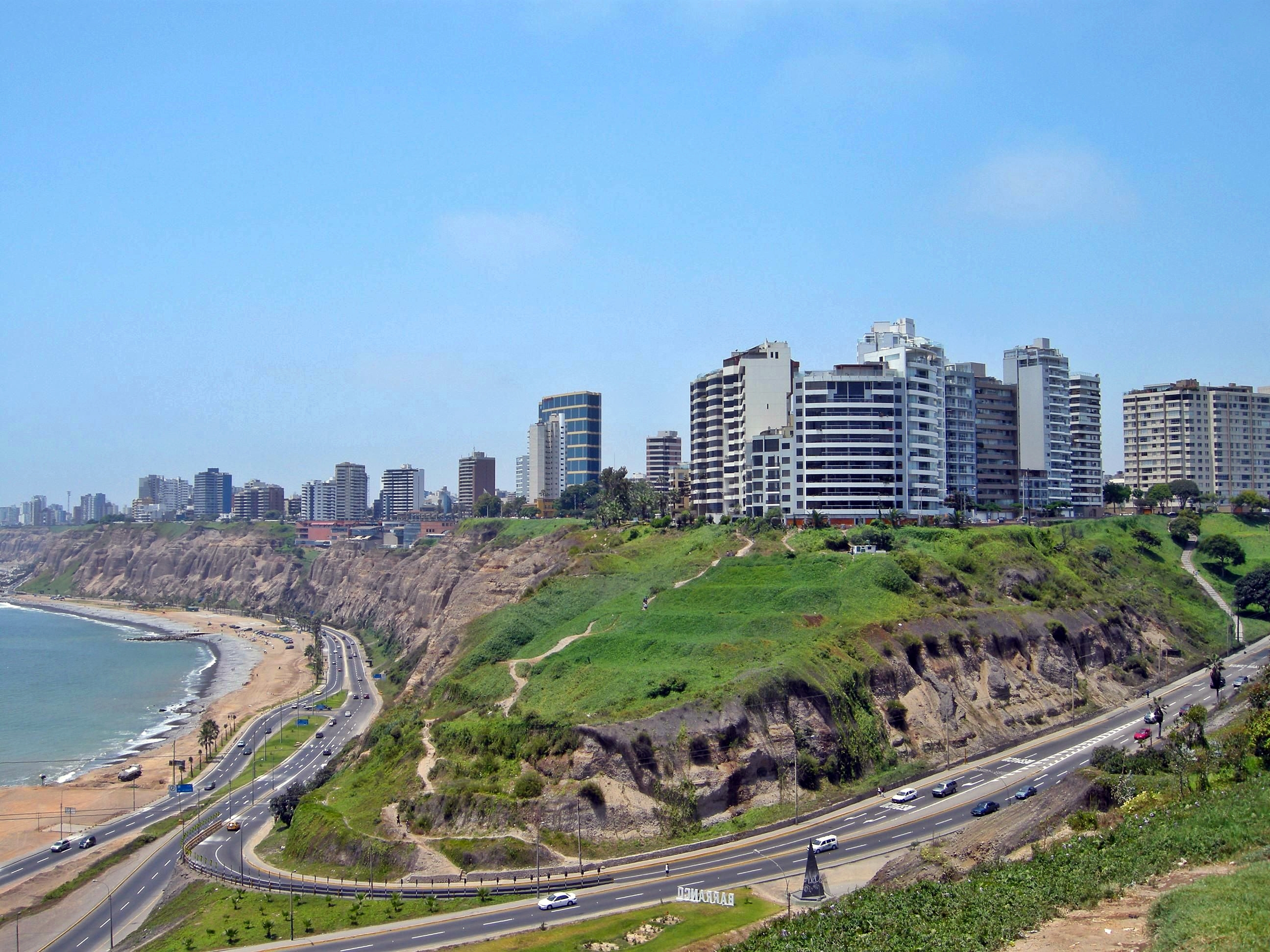
- View from Barranco
- Interactive map of Costa Verde
- Part of: Route № CL-100 (Callao)
- Namesake: See relevant section
- From: Avenida Malecón Grau
- Major junctions: Lima: Acceso Regatas; Bajada Armendáriz; Bajada Balta; Bajada San Martín; Bajada Marbella; Bajada Brasil; Acceso Universitaria; Acceso Jorge Chávez; Acceso Escardó; Acceso Virú; Callao: Acceso Virú; Acceso Haya de la Torre; Acceso Santa Rosa; Acceso Miguel Grau
- To: Avenida Miguel Grau

Construction
- Completed: April 4, 2023
- Inauguration: December 15, 1970

Other
- Designer: Ernesto Aramburú

The Costa Verde Beach Circuit (Spanish: Circuito de playas de la Costa Verde), also simply the Costa Verde (lit. 'Green Coast'), is a highway in Peru, located along the coast of Lima and Callao's metropolitan area. It unites the districts of La Punta, La Perla, San Miguel, Magdalena del Mar, San Isidro, Miraflores, Barranco and Chorrillos.

The highway was conceived by architect Ernesto Aramburú, who served as mayor of Miraflores from 1970 to 1976. Following a series of studies in the region, construction works began in the 1960s using land dug up for the construction of Paseo de la República Avenue. The highway was inaugurated in 1970, facilitating access to the beaches of Lima, which until then were reached via stairways located in ravines along the cliffs commonly known as "bajadas de los baños".

The highway is administered by the municipal governments of the districts through which it passes and the Regional Government of Callao, both in full coordination with the Costa Verde Project Authority (Autoridad del Proyecto Costa Verde; APCV), a decentralised entity of the Metropolitan Municipality of Lima in charge of the Costa Verde's comprehensive planning.

== Name ==
The name alludes to the vision of its initiator, who aimed to transform the otherwise untouched cliffs of Lima's coast into a lush space filled with vegetation through the establishment of plant nurseries.

It is also known as the Vía Costa Verde (lit. 'Costa Verde Way') or as the Circuito de Playas. In Callao, it is officially known as Ruta № CL-100.

== History ==
Postcard of a bajada in Miraflores.

Prior to the construction of the highway, the cliffs located southwest of Lima were located immediately adjacent to the Pacific Ocean up until the early 20th century. Access to the few beaches at the bottom was thus achieved through pathways known as bajadas, located in the city's ravines (Balta, Armendáriz, Regatas and Herradura) and used by the locals at Miraflores, Barranco and Chorrillos, at the time seaside resorts separate from the city prior to the process of urbanisation during the mid-to-late 20th century.

In addition to the aforementioned footpaths, a cable car was built by German citizen Rudolf L. Holtig in Barranco, inaugurated on July 28, 1896, by Nicolás de Piérola, and operative until 1930, after which it was permanently closed in 1971. In 1935, a resort was built in Miraflores by architect Héctor Velarde; access to the building was made difficult due to a lack of stairs.

Opening of the avenue in 1928.

Although the government of José Pardo y Barreda took some initiatives, it was only during the second government of Augusto B. Leguía that roadworks in the area began. Leguía oversaw a road project to connect La Punta and Chorrillos, eventually inaugurated on October 28, 1928, as the Carretera Patria Nueva (later known as the Avenida Costanera). At the time, the road and its promenade—a broad pedestrian footpath next to the road—reached Brazil Avenue, joining Bellavista and San Miguel.

Efforts to reclaim land were also made under Leguía by the Boza family, who spent a large amount of money building containment dykes at La Perla, which proved unsuccessful.

=== Construction ===
The project for a road system spanning the reclaimed land at the bottom of the city's cliffs was conceived by architect Ernesto Aramburú, who served as mayor of Miraflores. The land used for the project was dug up to make way for the Paseo de la República, another major project at the time. The Costa Verde project began in the 1960s, with its name coming from another part of the plan that included adding vegetation to the then bare cliffs.

Thanks to advances in technology and modern studies, breakwaters were built to deal with the tide and helped fill the coast with sand. The land taken from the expressway project, leading to the creation of several beaches between Chorrillos and Miraflores: Makaha, Redondo, La Pampilla, Las Sombrillas, Los Yuyos, Los Pavos, Barranquito, Las Cascadas, and Agua Dulce. Also built were yacht clubs, Surfing centres, restaurants and other similar businesses.

The road system was officially inaugurated on December 15, 1970. A 1.5-kilometre (0.93 mi) extension in Miraflores was inaugurated on December 27, 1984. In 1983, La Rosa Náutica, a seaside restaurant, was built on one of the jetties next to the road circuit.

On May 19, 2014, construction began on the road extending from the San Miguel border to the district of La Punta, with completion scheduled for August 2015. The regional governor of Callao stated that the project would be ready in May 2016.

On August 19, 2016, the Council of Lima approved the budget for studies regarding the construction of a 3-kilometre (1.9 mi) stretch in San Miguel, extending from Avenida Universitaria to Callao. In 2018, the construction of the Costa Verde boardwalk section between San Isidro and Miraflores was supervised. On February 27, 2020, the section of the Costa Verde between Rafael Escardó Avenue and Virú Street was completed.

On November 4, 2022, the first section of the highway in Callao was inaugurated, comprising the exits from the Haya de la Torre Avenue and Santa Rosa Avenue viaducts, serving as an additional connecting route between Callao and Lima. The second and final section of the highway in Callao was inaugurated on December 29, 2022. However, because construction details had not been finalized, it was closed again and subsequently re-inaugurated on April 4, 2023.

=== Controversies ===
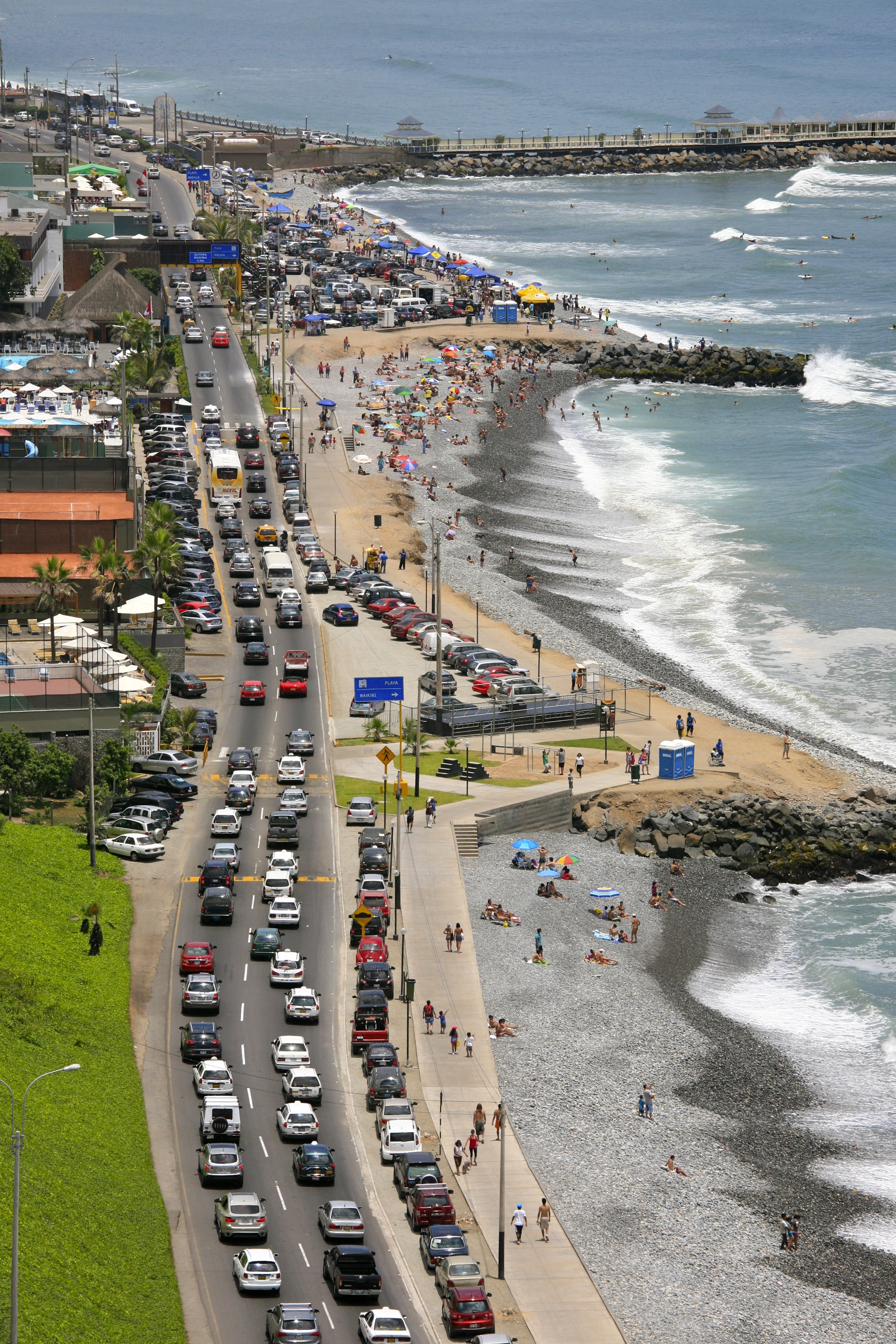
Traffic jam in La Pampilla.

Several experts have argued that the Costa Verde should be prioritized for recreational use rather than for automobiles. They also identified deficiencies in various sections, such as confusing speed limit signage—or a lack thereof near bridges and curves—poor road design at intersections, and confusing, overlapping lane markings. Between January and July 2015, 54 vehicle accidents were reported, resulting in two fatalities and ten serious injuries. Consequently, the installation of speed cameras began in August.

In 2005, the construction of the Lima Marina Club—designed to accommodate 150 private vessels—sparked backlash from activists.

Construction of a third lane in each direction began in August 2014, under the mayoralty of Susana Villarán, but was suspended on December 24. Construction works between Miraflores and Chorrillos resumed in early 2015 under Luis Castañeda's administration, set to be completed in May 2015. The construction of the third lane faced strong criticism from beachgoers. The installation of a metal barrier forces traffic to use this new lane. There are concerns that the third lane could collapse due to the absence of a buffer strip of land to prevent corrosion caused by moisture and proximity to the surf. In May, wave action undermined the base of the newly built third lane. Despite the availability of the third lane, drivers and motorcyclists continue to use the beach area to avoid congestion. Concerns have also been raised that the construction work will alter wave patterns at La Pampilla, a site that has hosted world surfing championships. On the other hand, the municipality maintains that the project will increase traffic flow by 30%.

On August 20, 2015, Mayor of Lima Luis Castañeda announced the construction of a bike path near the third traffic lane, and on October 17, 2015, the installation of the boardwalk's support piles began. The project has faced criticism on several fronts: from the outset, it lacked the necessary authorizations—specifically, environmental certification from its respective ministry and the right to use the aquatic area granted by the Peruvian Navy. Concerns have also been raised regarding the design: its lack of integration with existing pedestrian and cyclist spaces, the risk of fatal accidents in the event of derailments, the adequacy of space for cyclists and pedestrians, the height clearance required for emergencies, and the danger of destruction by wave action. Conversely, Castañeda defended the construction, asserting that it was based on technical criteria and would not obstruct the view of the sea. A poll showed that 53% of respondents favored the boardwalk's construction, while 36% were opposed.

In September 2015, plans to build a hotel on the cliffside met with opposition from the Geological Society of Peru due to concerns regarding vulnerability to tsunamis and earthquakes. Conversely, proponents claim the structure stabilizes the cliff and that the risk of tsunami damage is reduced by the building's elevated position.

In late April 2015, the Metropolitan Municipality of Lima placed rocks on La Pampilla Beach to build a third traffic lane, without authorisation from the Peruvian Coast Guard. This action sparked a conflict pitting beachgoers, surfers, and the Navy against mayor Castañeda. The socio-environmental dispute concluded on May 4, when Castañeda acknowledged a lack of communication on the part of his administration and announced the removal of the rocks.

=== Recent history ===
During the 2007 Peru earthquake, the highway was damaged and temporarily closed.

The Costa Verde-San Miguel Park was inaugurated in 2019 to be used in the Pan American Games, as well as the Parapan American Games.

The highway is often closed for marathon races. A cable car is set to be finished in 2026.

== Route ==
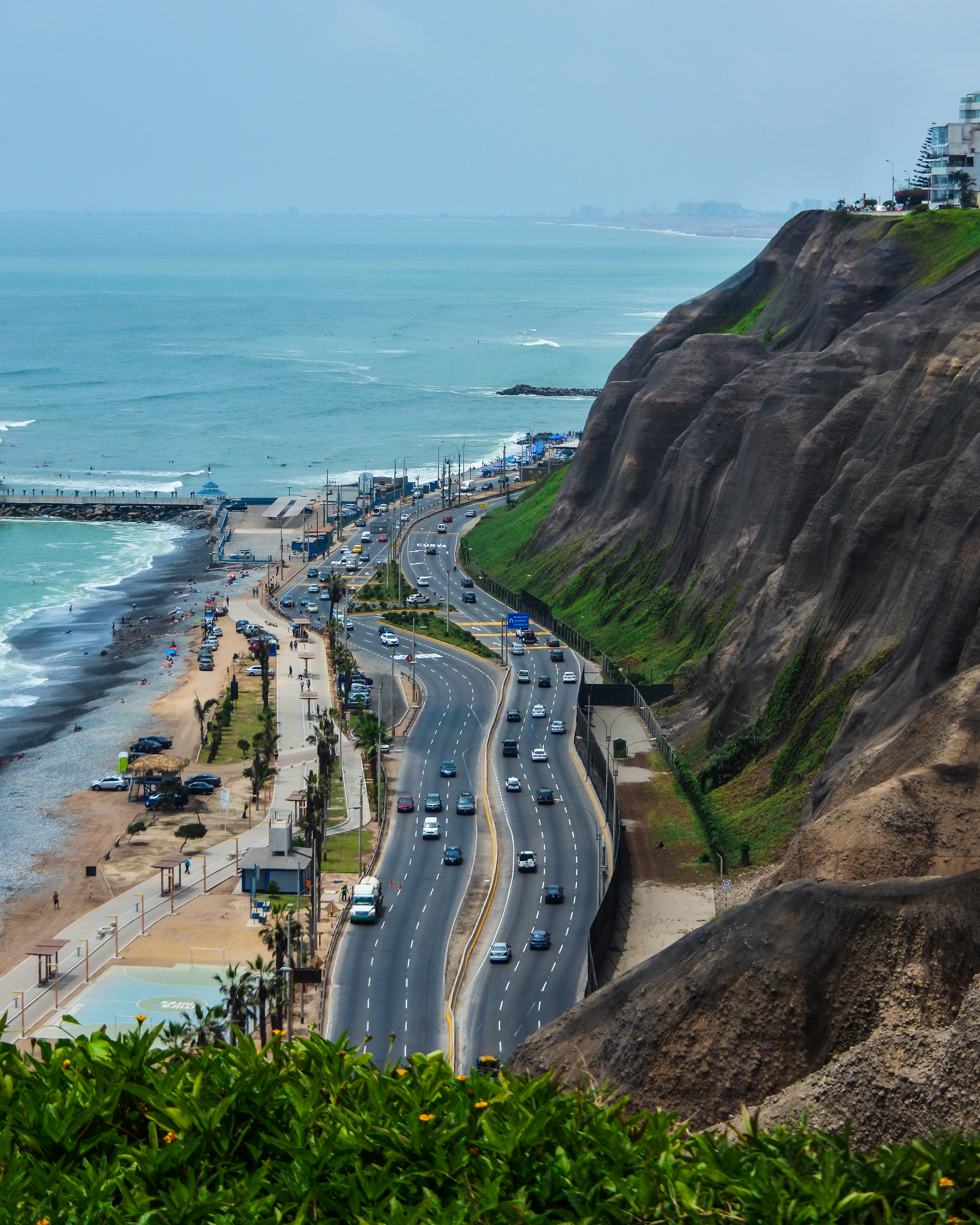
View of the highway heading north.

The highway begins at Malecón Grau Avenue in Chorrillos, behind the Club de Regatas Lima, and continues until it reaches Miguel Grau (formerly Buenos Aires) Avenue in La Punta. A ramp located near Virú Street, after which it is named, connects it with Costanera Avenue at the border between Callao and San Miguel. It has a total length of about 27 kilometres (17 mi).

== Transportation ==
Since 2014, the highway has had three lanes, and since 2015, a bike lane. Vehicles are subject to a speed limit of 60 kilometres per hour (37 mph).

The road system also features nine pedestrian access paths. In early 2020, two provisional pedestrian walkways were built in Miraflores and Barranco.

- Acceso Escardó, in San Miguel. Restored in February 2020. Its pedestrian bridge was inaugurated in late 2021.
- Acceso Universitaria, in San Miguel. Opened in November 2010.
- Acceso Bertolotto, in San Miguel. Opened in November 2010.
- Acceso John Lennon, in San Miguel. Opened in October 2014.
- Bajada Sucre, in Magdalena del Mar.
- Bajada Marbella, in Magdalena del Mar.
- Acceso Pera del Amor, in San Isidro.
- Acceso Estadio Héroe Manuel Bonilla, in San Isidro.
- Acceso María Reiche, in Miraflores.
- Acceso Itzhak Rabin, in Miraflores. Opened in November 2010 and restored in January 2015.
- Bajada Balta (Bajada Clubes), in Miraflores. Restored in January 2015.
- Acceso Redondo, in Miraflores.
- Acceso Cascadas, in Barranco.
- Bajada de los Baños, in Barranco.
- Bajada Agua Dulce (Acceso Huaylas), in Chorrillos.
- Acceso Mariscal Castilla, in Chorrillos.

=== Cable car service ===
In 2022, the Municipality of Miraflores signed a contract with the Peruvian-Austrian consortium Zig Zag Teleféricos SAC, which will be responsible for the country's capital's first tourist cable car. The project aims to feature two lines and the capacity to transport 15 passengers at a time per trip. It is estimated to cover a distance of 310 meters, from Domodossola Park on the Miraflores boardwalk to Redondo Beach, in just three minutes. It was scheduled to begin operations in May or June 2026.

As of September 2026, it was described as "99.9% complete" and soon to be opened.

== See also ==
- Paseo de la República Avenue
