= Costa Verde (Peru) =

Protected area of Peru

Coordinates: 12°05′54″S 77°04′41″W

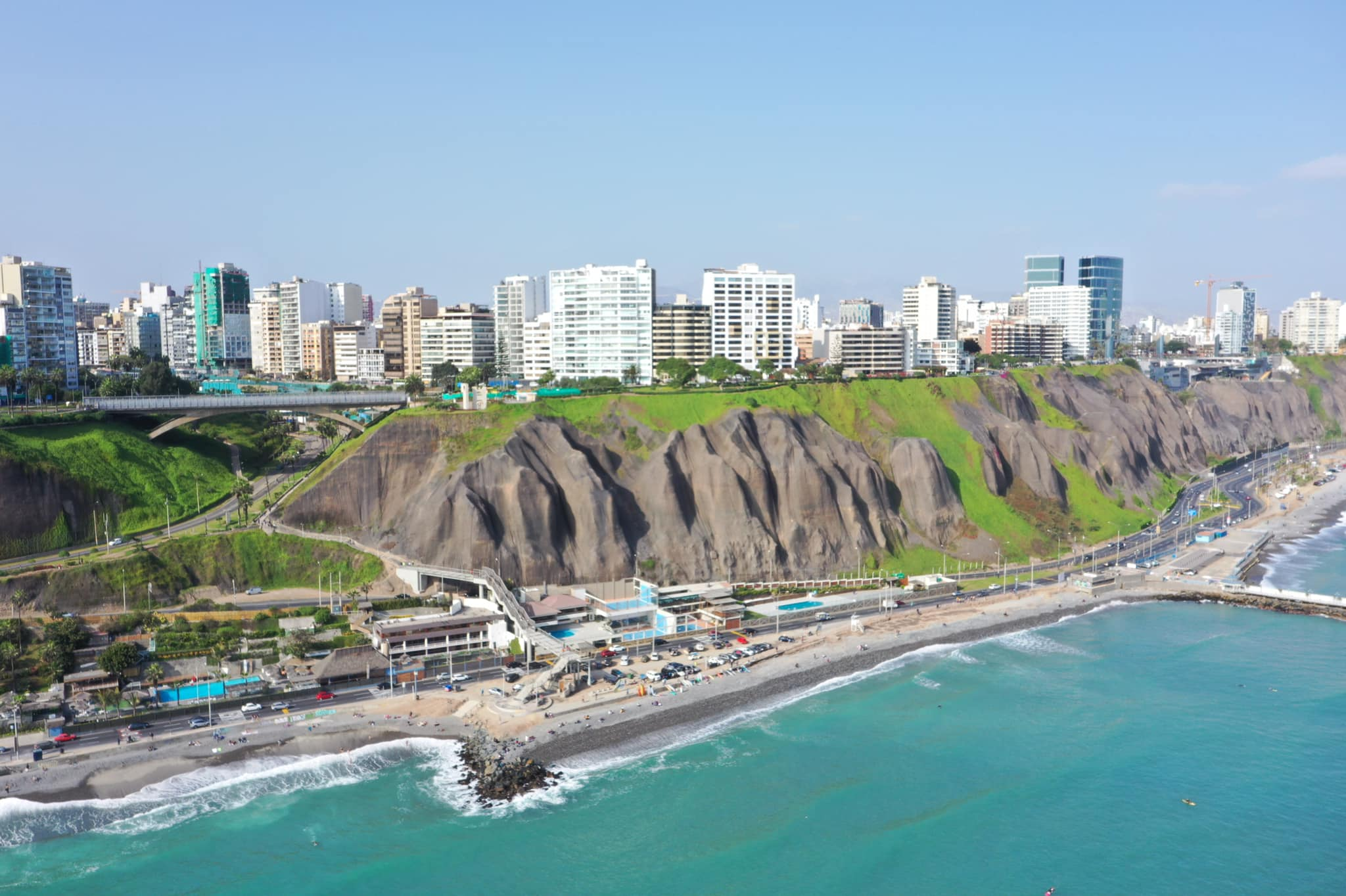
- View of the coastline in Miraflores
- Interactive map of Costa Verde
- Location: Callao & Lima, Peru

The Costa Verde (lit. 'Green Coast') is a scenic coastal strip in Lima and Callao, Peru. Covering a total length of 22.5 kilometres (14.0 mi), it extends from the Peninsula of La Punta to La Chira hill. It is characterized by its cliffs, esplanades, and beaches, along which runs a highway that spans the entire bay of Lima, connecting several riverside districts. Due to its location, Lima stands out for being the only capital in South America that faces the Pacific Ocean, known in Peru as the Mar de Grau.

The area was originally a series of cliffs immediately adjacent to the ocean, which changed following the construction of the Costa Verde highway, designed by architect Ernesto Aramburú. Inaugurated on December 15, 1970, the Costa Verde has become a key point for entertainment, recreation and culture, as well as tourism. It takes its name from the highway's afforestation project, which transformed the area in the 1960s.

The coast's geography has allowed it to become a focal point for several sports, such as walking, bathing, bicycle touring, surfing, picnicking, paragliding and birdwatching, among others. The area features several of the city's major landmarks, including buildings, parks, and other public installations.

== Geography ==
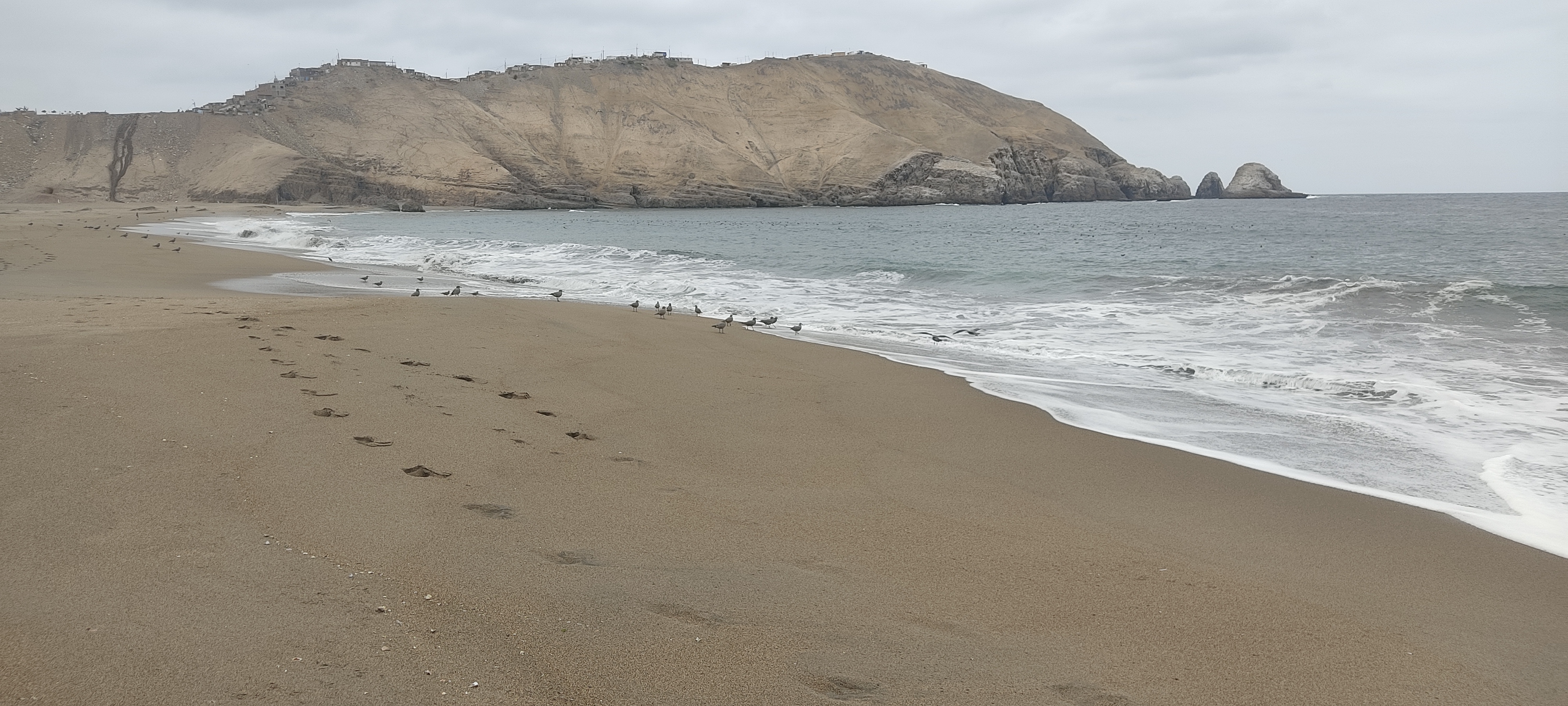
La Chira beach, in Chorrillos.

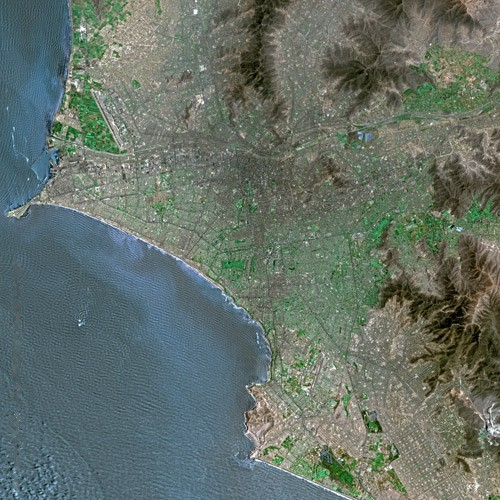
Satellite view of Lima.

The Costa Verde encompasses the coastal strip of the bay of Lima, stretching from the Peninsula of La Punta to La Chira hill. Situated along the coast are various beaches and cliffs, as well as the La Arenilla wetland, the Morro Solar, Marcavilca, and La Chira hills, and the Huatica and Surco canals. It comprises the districts of La Punta and La Perla in Callao, and San Miguel, Magdalena del Mar, San Isidro, Miraflores, Barranco and Chorrillos in Lima.

The Costa Verde features two ecosystems: the cold Humboldt Current and the coastal desert. It also encompasses natural habitats—such as the sea, La Chira Beach and Islets, the Marcavilca hills, and the cliffs—as well as anthropogenic environments, including beaches, parks (located both above and below the cliffs), modified cliff areas, wetlands, a waterfall, and canals. It provides ecosystem services related to provisioning, regulation, habitat support, and cultural values.

The Armendáriz ravine (Quebrada de Armendáriz) is located in the southern part of Miraflores district. The area was known as the Armendáriz estate—where farmland existed until the 1930s—and was subsequently urbanized as the city developed.

=== Beaches ===
The beaches located along the Costa Verde in Lima are: La Chira, La Herradura, La Caplina, Club Regatas 3, Club Regatas 2, Club Regatas 1, Pescadores, Agua Dulce Sur A, Agua Dulce Norte B, Las Sombrillas, Los Yuyos, Barranco, Los Pavos, Barranquito, Las Cascadas, Miraflores, Los Delfines, La Estrella, Redondo I, Redondo II, Makaha, Waikiki, La Pampilla, Punta Roquitas, Tres Picos, Los Delfines, and Marbella; in Callao, the beaches are Mar Brava, Carpayo I, Carpayo II, Los Cocos, Guilligan Poza, Guilligan Mar Afuera, Malecón Pardo, and Arenilla.

Agua Dulce is one of the most popular beaches in Lima and Peru. On January 1, 2024, nearly 50,000 beachgoers flocked to the beach, with crowds forming on the pedestrian bridges as people tried to enter or leave the beach area.

Carpayo Beach is located in Callao. It was considered the "dirtiest beach in Latin America," accumulating 60 tons of waste along a 500-metre (1,600 ft) stretch. Among the debris were bottle caps, plastic nets, planks, construction materials, furniture, computers, vehicle parts, windows, and a human skull. The water quality has been rated as healthy by the Ministry of Health.

=== Wetlands ===
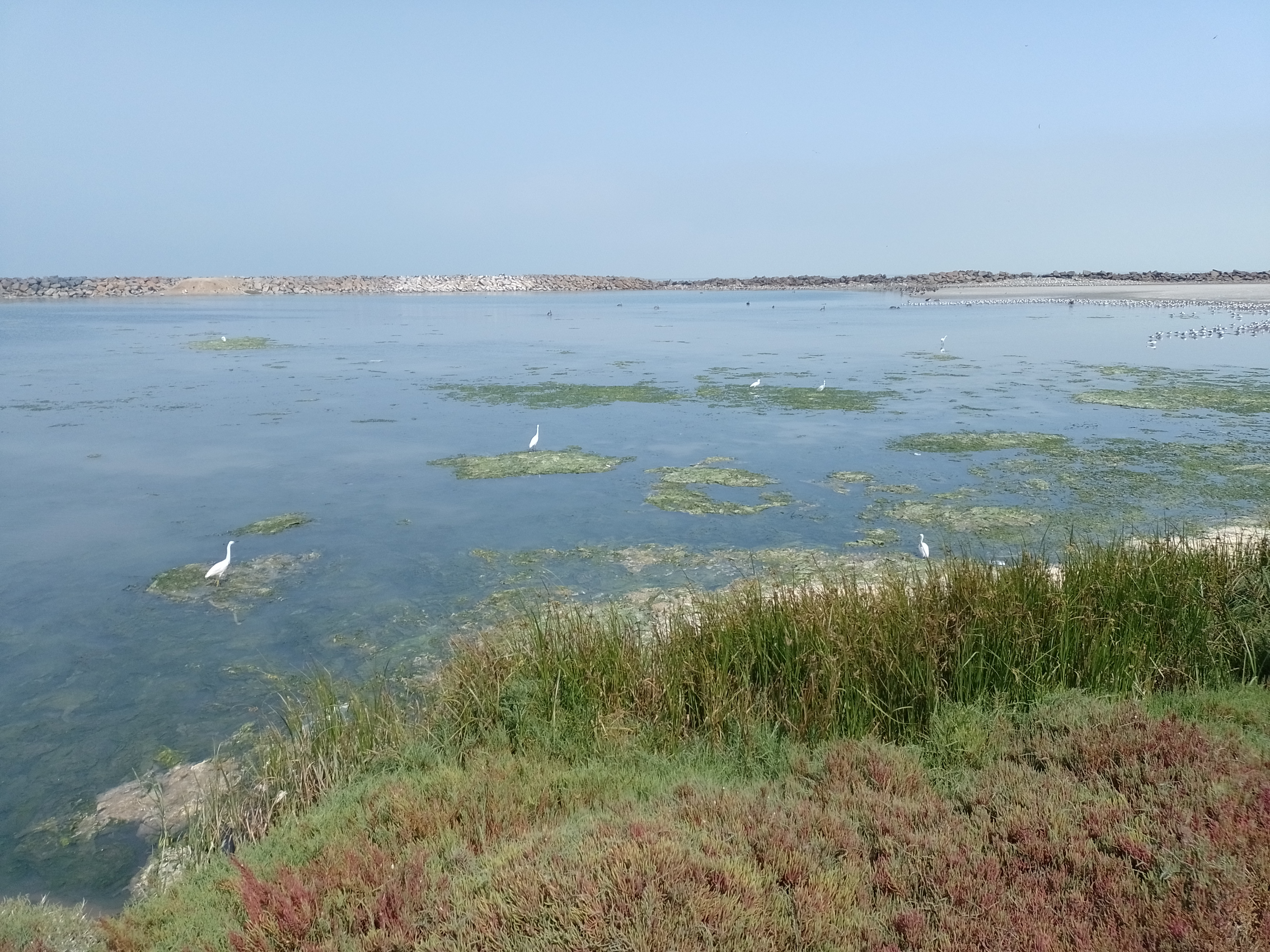
Birds at La Arenilla.

The Estrella, Barranquito, Agua Dulce, and Chorrillos beaches feature aquifers; this groundwater flows from the Andes to reach the beaches of the Costa Verde. The name Chorrillos refers to the streams of fresh water that flow from the cliffs toward the beaches. La Estrella Beach, in the Miraflores, also exhibits freshwater seepage.

The La Arenilla wetland is an artificial ecosystem covering 18.2 hectares (45 acres). It was formed in 1967 following the construction of two breakwaters for coastal protection. It has been designated a municipal protected area. Seventy-two bird species—primarily migratory—have been recorded in the Poza de La Arenilla coastal wetland area; the endemic species Cinclodes taczanowskii is also notable.

== Geology ==
From the Costa Verde, one can make out the islands of La Horadara, El Frontón, and San Lorenzo, as well as the La Mina hills on San Lorenzo Island. Located 16.5 kilometres (10.3 mi) from the Morro Solar, these islands—together with San Lorenzo and El Frontón—form a geological chain 10 kilometres (6.2 mi) in length.

== Ecology ==
Seventy-two bird species have been recorded in the area, primarily migratory ones. Among the birds found there are the Neotropic cormorant, Spotted sandpiper, American oystercatcher, Killdeer, Black oystercatcher, Franklin's gull, Peruvian seaside cinclodes, and Andean gull.

== History ==
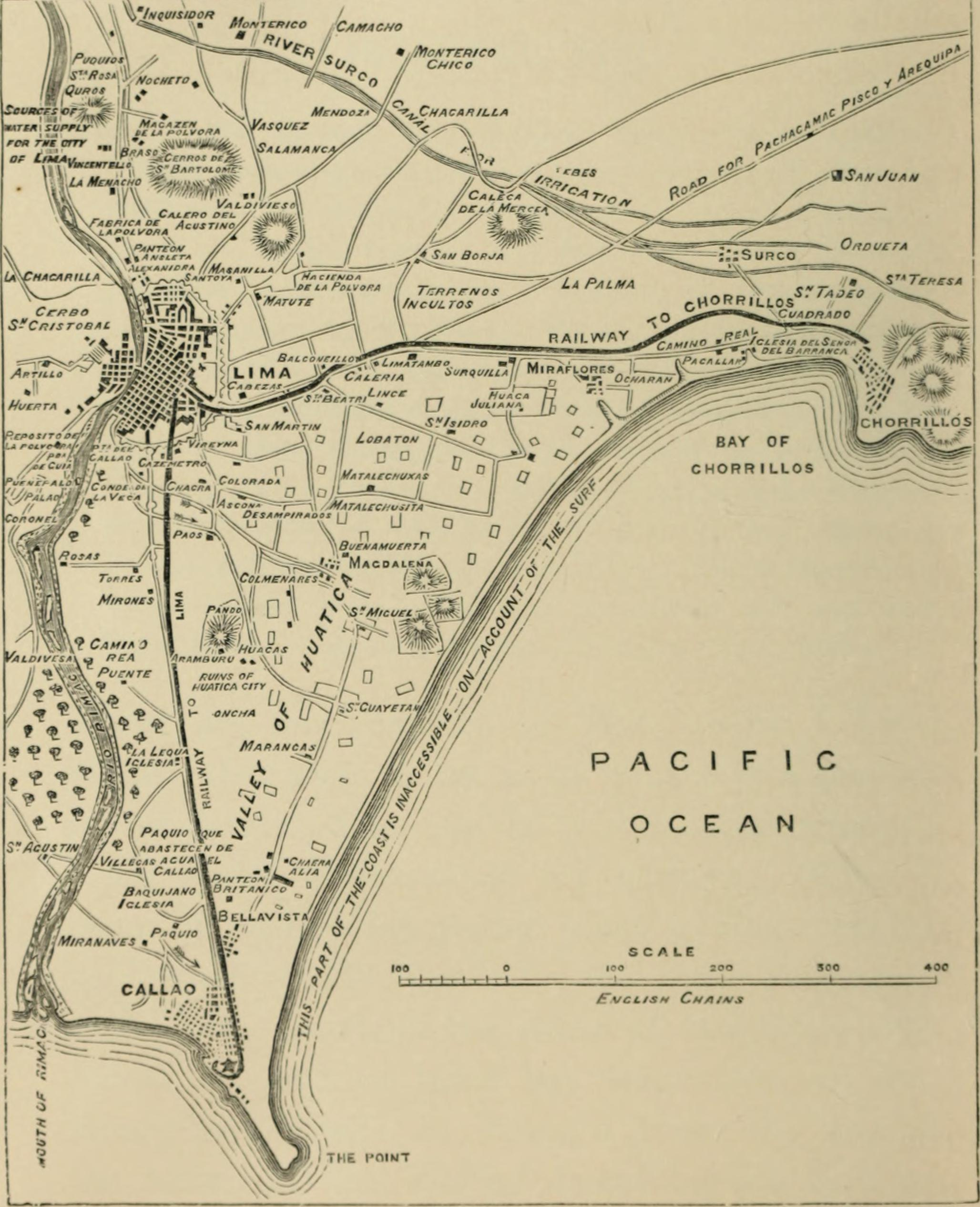
1873 map of Lima.

The Morro Solar was part of a triad of elevations in Lima that—along with San Cristóbal Hill and San Lorenzo Island—were sites held sacred since pre-Hispanic times. The territory was occupied by the Ichma culture, which dates from the 12th to the 15th century. The central coast—specifically the valley—was inhabited by the Maranga and Sulco chiefdoms, whose people engaged in agriculture and rudimentary fishing. The capital of the Surco chiefdom was Armatampu (or Ichimatampu), located on the eastern slope of Morro Solar. Later, the area was occupied by the Incas. Archaeologist Yanina Vargas notes that Armatambo was linked to the Pachacámac sanctuary via a network of primary and secondary roads. Armatambo played a significant geopolitical role, as it was the nearest port capable of accommodating large vessels. In the valley, the pre-Hispanic irrigation canal known as the Huatica River was used to fertilize agricultural land by watering the fields; the waterway currently empties out at the Marbella cliffs. Today, its waters are used to irrigate green spaces.

In February 2020, the remains of an individual—possibly a fisherman—were discovered in Chorrillos; upon death, he had been wrapped in several bundles containing offerings, including a *Spondylus* shell, associated with maritime life.

=== Spanish period ===
Under the Spanish, encomiendas were established, one of which was granted to Antonio del Solar, a companion of the conquistador Francisco Pizarro and the namesake of the Morro Solar.

The name "San Pedro de los Chorrillos" originated from the freshwater seeps in the cliffs of Agua Dulce Beach and the local fishing communities. The area was settled by a group of fishermen from Huacho and Surco, following a donation of land made by the Royal Ensign Francisco Carrasco.

The town of Barranco is said to have originated from a miraculous event in the mid-18th century, when a group of indigenous fishermen from Surco spotted a luminous cross-shaped apparition on the cliffs. Later, a baker named Caicedo attributed the miracle to the Lord of the Ravine (Señor del Barranco) after his wife recovered from a critical condition; in gratitude, the first chapel was built. Subsequently, the future settlement developed around the site of the current Hermitage.

In 1557, the doctrina of Santa María Magdalena was established.

=== 19th century ===
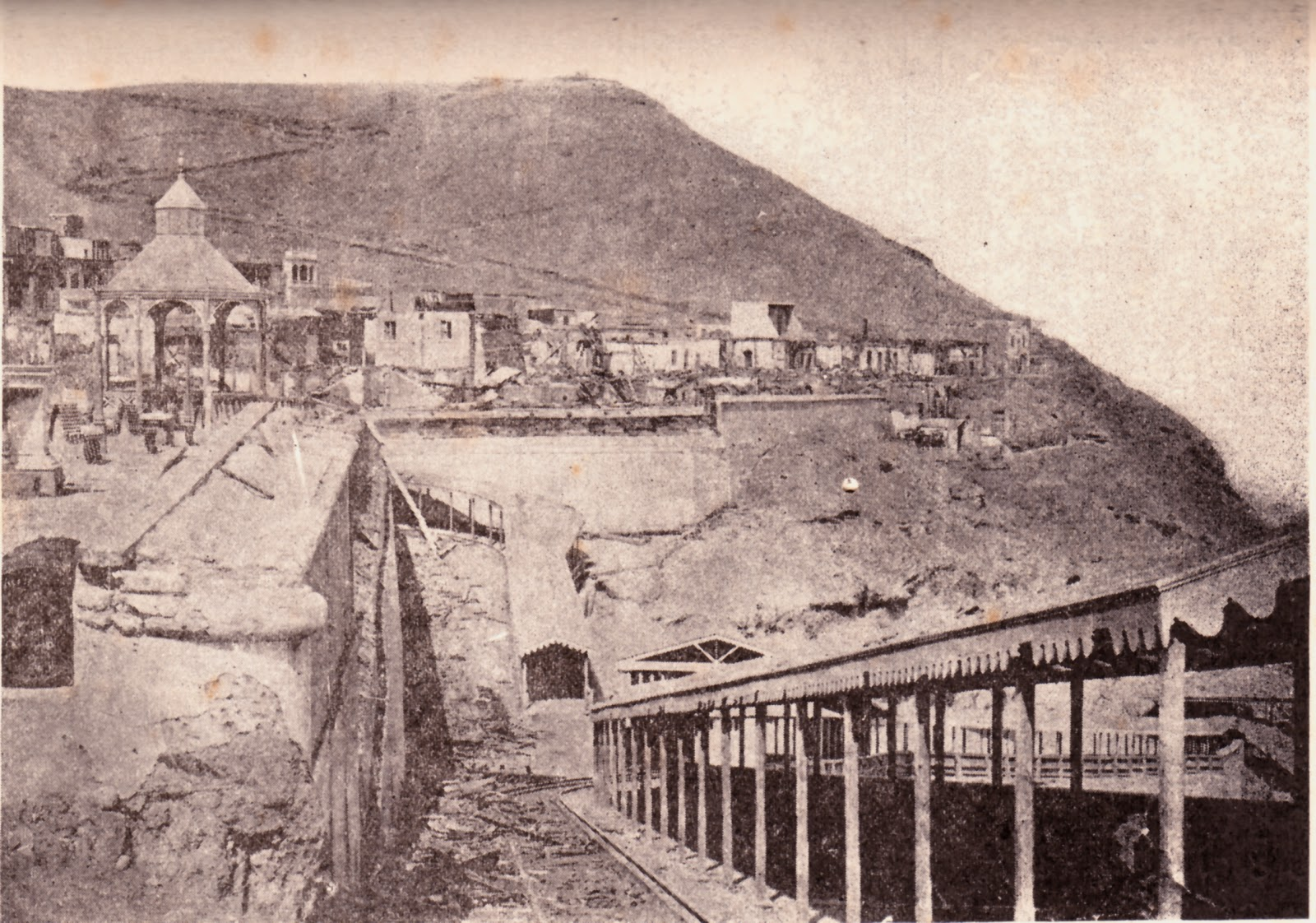
The bajada of war-torn Chorrillos in 1881.

During the Peruvian War of Independence, fisherman José Olaya—a native of Chorrillos—served as a secret messenger carrying communications to the patriots. Olaya may have swum from Chorrillos to Callao; he would then walk to Lima carrying fish, concealing the information.

In Callao, the origins of football in Peru date back to the era of independence, when English sailors played the sport on the plains of Mar Bravo—which would become the first sports field in both Peru and the Americas. Furthermore, there was constant maritime traffic between the ports of Callao and Valparaíso; Argentine journalist Jorge Barraza explains that it was there people first witnessed that marvelous move involving a contorted body—known as la chalaca—a name that appeared in various Chilean newspapers around 1900, where the move was referred to as "the chalaca or the chorera."

In the past, vacationers from Lima only had the seaside resorts of Cantolao (in La Punta), Ancón, and Herradura Beach (in Chorrillos) at their disposal. Consequently, residents of Lima were said to "live with their backs to the sea" due to their limited interaction with the coastline.

In the mid-19th century, plans were drawn up to build a railway connecting Callao and Lima. Following this initial line, the Lima-Chorrillos railway line was constructed, featuring stops at Limatambo, Miraflores, and Barranco. The Bajada Balta was also built during that same century.

From the time of independence, Chorrillos evolved from a fishing port into a seaside resort during the guano era. It was frequented by the capital's elite and enjoyed a "golden age" that lasted until the War of the Pacific and the military occupation of Lima and its surroundings in 1881.

On July 1, 1872, a new settlement was established on the shores of "Mar Bella," occupying the lands of the Orbea and Oyague estates. The settlement was designed to serve as a seaside resort, and the Dibós Baths were built there. During the War of the Pacific, the inhabitants left for the capital, but the area was repopulated in 1892. President Nicolás de Piérola approved the project for the avenue now known as Brasil.

During the War of the Pacific, the Battle of San Juan—also known as the Lima campaign—took place on January 13, 1881; the conflict unfolded across Villa, the plains of San Juan and Santa Teresa, Marcavilca Hill, Morro Solar, and Chorrillos, resulting in a victory for the Chilean Army. Historian Deolinda Villa notes that there were approximately 6,000 Peruvian casualties and a similar number on the Chilean side. Subsequently, Morro Solar became a site of patriotic pilgrimage visited by the bereaved; in the 20th century, funding was secured to build a chapel dedicated to the Virgin Mary. By the 1920s, however, the remains of the combatants had been moved to ossuaries in Chorrillos and Miraflores, and the visits by the bereaved ceased.

Following the battle, fires and looting broke out in Chorrillos and Barranco. On January 14, 1881, the Chilean army arrived in Barranco, destroying several houses, the Ermita, and the Bridge of Sighs. Although the Armistice of San Juan was concluded in response to this situation, the Battle of Miraflores nevertheless took place, bringing the war's third land campaign to a close and marking the beginning of the occupation of Lima.

The baños of Chorrillos were characterized by the "calmness of the sea and the mild temperature of its waters," as well as its "arduous" access. The Club Regatas Lima was founded in 1875 for the sport of rowing. Due to the influx of visitors, the Chorrillos seaside resort was established. Subsequently, the Baños de Barranco access path was opened.

=== 20th century ===
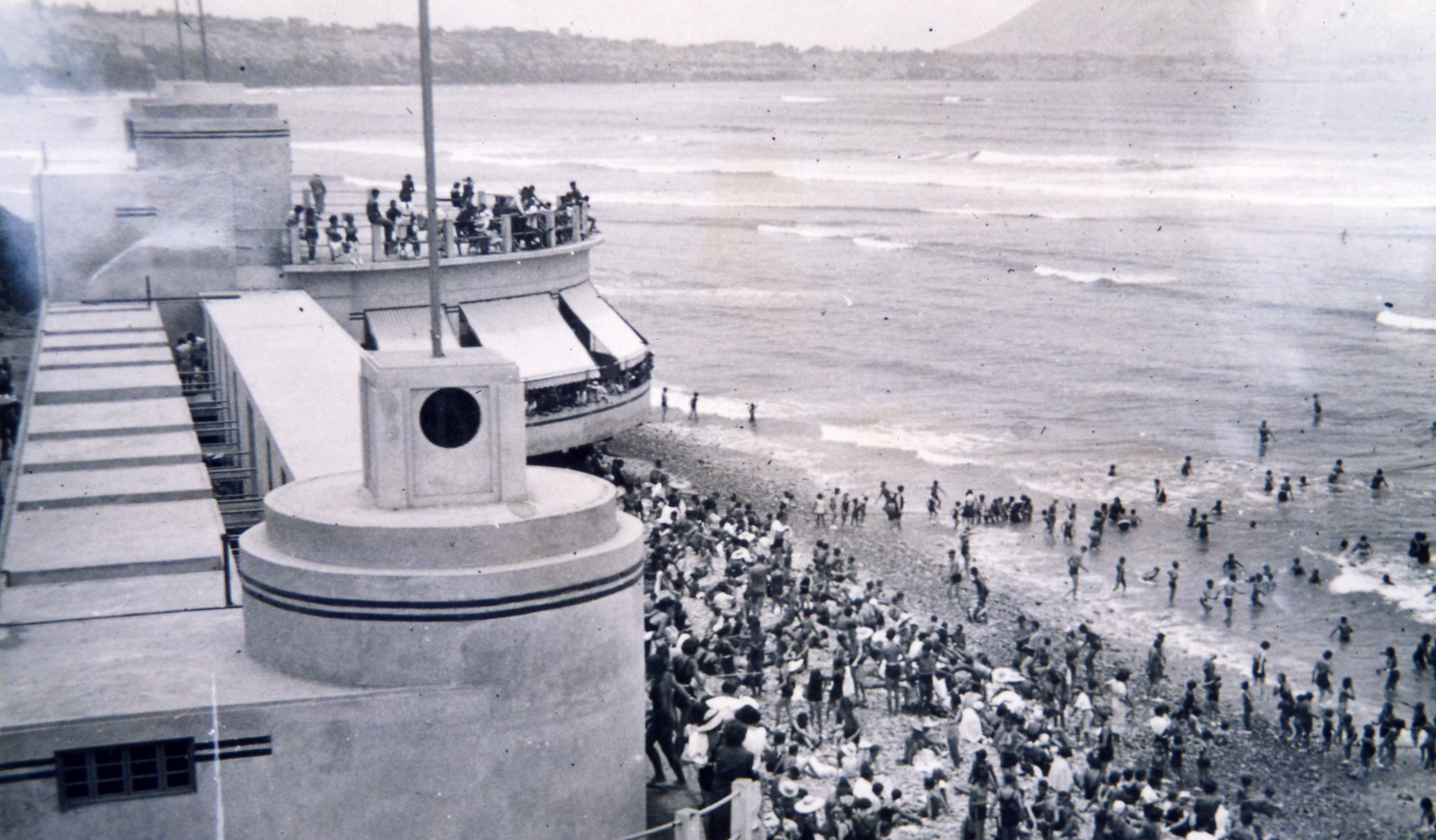
The Baños de Miraflores.

The bajada of Barranco was frequented by fishermen from Surco to access the beaches of Barranco. The funicular providing access to the Baños de Barranco was inaugurated on July 28, 1896. The bathing resort itself was built during the 1910s. In the 1920s, during the Leguía administration, the Baños became fashionable. In the 1930s, several residences were built near the cliffs of Barranco and occupied by wealthy citizens. By 1971, Mayor Eduardo Dibós ordered the demolition of the Baños de Barranco to build a road allowing vehicular access, leaving the funicular disused.

In the early 20th century, the electric tram began operating, expanding with the construction of the Tanderini Bridge and the La Herradura Tunnel. Service ceased in 1965.

The administration of José Pardo took some initiative regarding the area, but it was not until the government of Augusto B. Leguía that construction began on a road connecting La Punta with Chorrillos. It was during that period—coinciding with the arrival of the first automobiles in Peru—that the first section of the Costanera Avenue was inaugurated (as the Carretera Patria Nueva) on October 28, 1928, linking the districts of Bellavista and San Miguel. The avenue reached Brazil Avenue and featured a wide-sidewalked esplanade.

Several facilities were established in Magdalena on March 9, 1930, due to its “beneficent climate,” such as the Víctor Larco Herrera hospital complex, the Pérez Araníbar Children's Home, and the Escuelas Climáticas (open-air schools).

Meanwhile, a mansion had stood in La Perla since 1932. This European-style building, which overlooked the sea, was constructed by the family of Héctor Boza, who served as a minister during the second administration of Óscar R. Benavides. President Benavides had planned to connect La Punta to Morro Solar, linking the area to the Pan-American Highway. The building was offered to former President Benavides for use as a summer home. Subsequently, the property passed to the Peruvian state following his death. Today, the building—now reduced to rubble, with only the concrete railings remaining—is located near a school.

Between 1934 and 1936, the Baños de Miraflores were built by architect Héctor Velarde; access was difficult due to the lack of steps. One reached the site by walking toward the sea along the bajada Balta—located above the old Bajada de los Baños. Featuring a modernist "ship-style" design, the building was constructed on reinforced concrete pillars situated between the cliff and the beach. The facility served recreational and sporting purposes, housing changing rooms for bathers, a restaurant, and a bar. It was ultimately demolished.

By the 1940s, Magdalena del Mar was connected to Lima by streetcar and to Miraflores and Callao by bus. During the 1940s and 1950s, the baños in Miraflores, Barranco, and Chorrillos were refurbished.

The Costa Verde highway, conceived by architect Ernesto Aramburú, was built in the 1960s, and first inaugurated in 1970, connecting the entirety of the region's coast.

=== 21st century ===
In the early hours of the year 2000, Sandro Baylón—a footballer for Alianza—died at the age of 23 in a car accident; he crashed his vehicle into a pole while driving along the Costa Verde access road near Marbella Beach. Following several traffic accidents on the Costa Verde, authorities subsequently implemented enhanced preventive measures, such as installing speed bumps and barriers to force vehicles to slow down. Between 2002 and 2003, the road was closed due to construction work on the Marbella access ramp, prompted by the vehicle accidents.

By the early 21st century, the coastal boardwalk between the districts of San Miguel and Magdalena was built. A section of the boardwalk connecting Chorrillos and Magdalena was also constructed. In the 2020s, the section extending to the Callao border was built. Between the 2000s and the 2010s, several buildings were constructed on the cliffs of the Barranco district.

During the 2007 Peru earthquake, the highway was damaged and temporarily closed.

== Landmarks ==
Larcomar overlooks the coast of Miraflores.

Several of the city's best known landmarks are located in the Costa Verde, including Eduardo Villena Rey Bridge, La Rosa Náutica, the Place of Memory, Tolerance and Social Inclusion, Larcomar, the Bridge of Friendship and Club Waikiki, in Miraflores; the Fisherman's Pier, Fishing Terminal and Club de Regatas Lima in Chorrillos; Arena 1, Multiespacio Costa 21, and Costa Verde Pan-American Complex in San Miguel; the Special Rescue Services Unit of the National Police of Peru, the Funicular and Lima Marina Club in Barranco.

Rodolfo León Gavilán Heliport is located at Tres Picos Beach, Miraflores. It was inaugurated on July 31, 2019, and measures 8 metres (26 ft) in diameter and 12 centimetres (4.7 in) in thickness, featuring a 1.20-metre (3 ft 11 in)-high fence.

A bridge, aiming to connect Miraflores and Barranco, began construction on June 24, 2024, with road closures planned for October 4. In December of the same year, construction works were paralysed. The bridge was inaugurated in August 2025.

== In popular culture ==
Residents of Lima ranked the Costa Verde second—with 33% of the vote—as the place that best represents the city. Also selected were Larcomar (17%) and the Morro Solar (7%), both located within the area. 89% of locals reported having visited some of the coast's beaches. It currently receives around 350,000 visitors during the summer season.

The area has been depicted in paintings by Pancho Fierro and Johann Moritz Rugendas, among others. It also appears in the written works of Mario Vargas Llosa.

== See also ==
- Costa Verde (highway)
- Malecón de Miraflores
- Bay of Lima
