= La Rosa Náutica =

Restaurant in Lima, Peru

Coordinates: 12°07′52″S 77°02′11″W

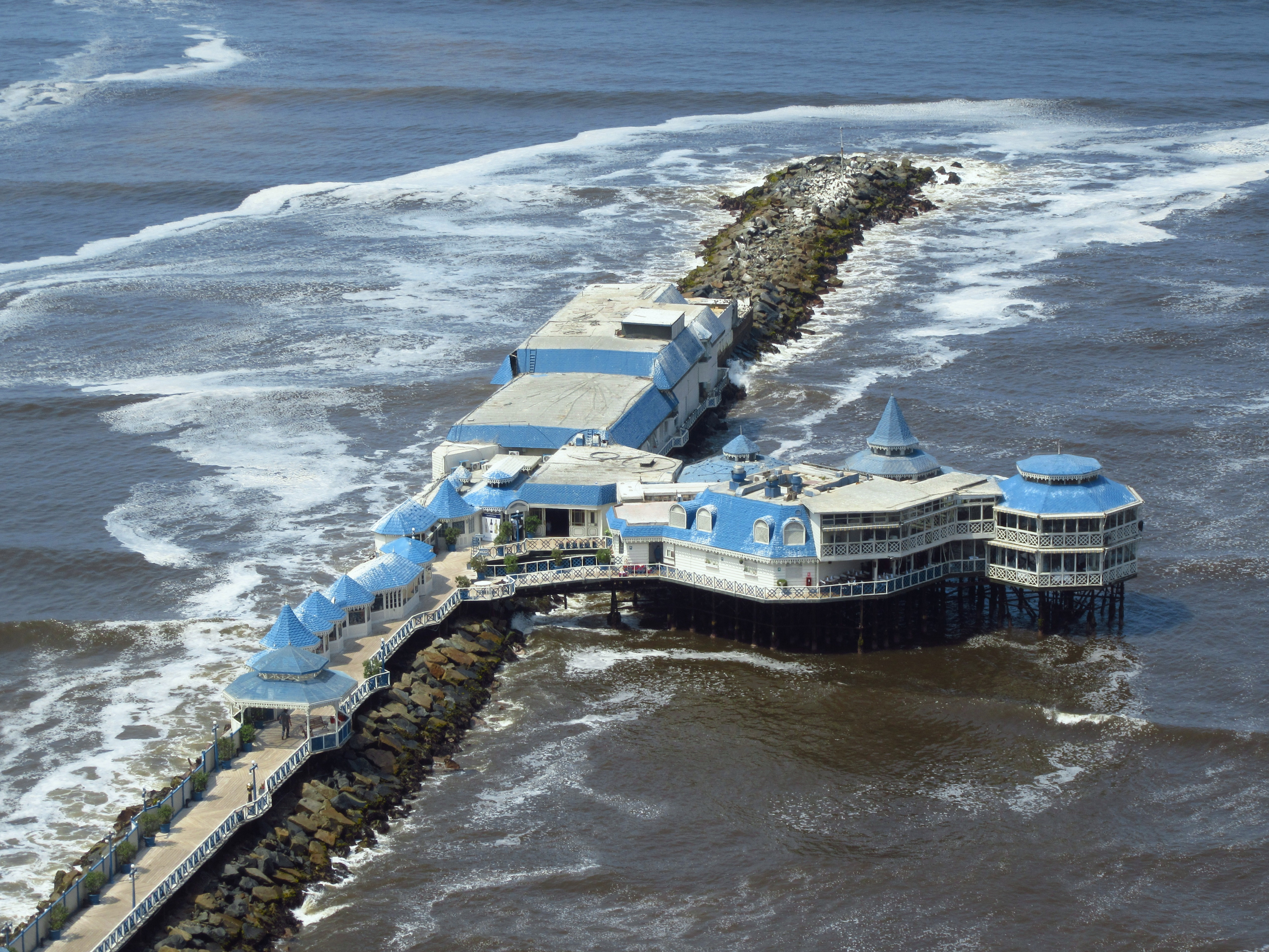
- Interactive map of La Rosa Náutica

Restaurant information
- Established: 1983
- Location: Espigón 4, Circuito de Playas, Miraflores, Lima, Peru
- Other locations: Buenos Aires; Bogotá (2011–2013)
- Website: larosanautica.com

La Rosa Náutica is a restaurant located on a jetty at the Costa Verde in Miraflores District, Lima, Peru.

== History ==
The restaurant, built in the Victorian-style, was founded in 1983 at the initiative of Carlín Semsch on a pier on the rocky jetty number 4 of the Costa Verde Beach Circuit in Miraflores district. In the beginning it was oriented towards international cuisine. In 2011 it opened a branch in Bogotá and in 2012 another in Buenos Aires. The branch in Colombia closed in 2013.

During the internal conflict in Peru, the restaurant was one of many locations attacked with dynamite on June 22, 1996. The attack also targeted a number of APRA offices and the embassy of Honduras.

In 2005 it was ranked fifth on a list by the Lima Chamber of Commerce of the favorite restaurants of businessmen in that city.

In October 2019, the Specialized Consumer Protection Chamber of the Indecopi Court found that the restaurant violated the Consumer Protection and Defense Code, since its menus were differentiated according to the gender of the clientele: those that did not have a price were for women, and those that do, for men. Consequently, the restaurant was fined S/. 210,000 ($ 62,000) for gender discrimination.

== See also ==
- Peruvian cuisine
