= Puente Santa Rosa =

Bridge in Lima, Peru

St. Rose Bridge Puente Santa Rosa
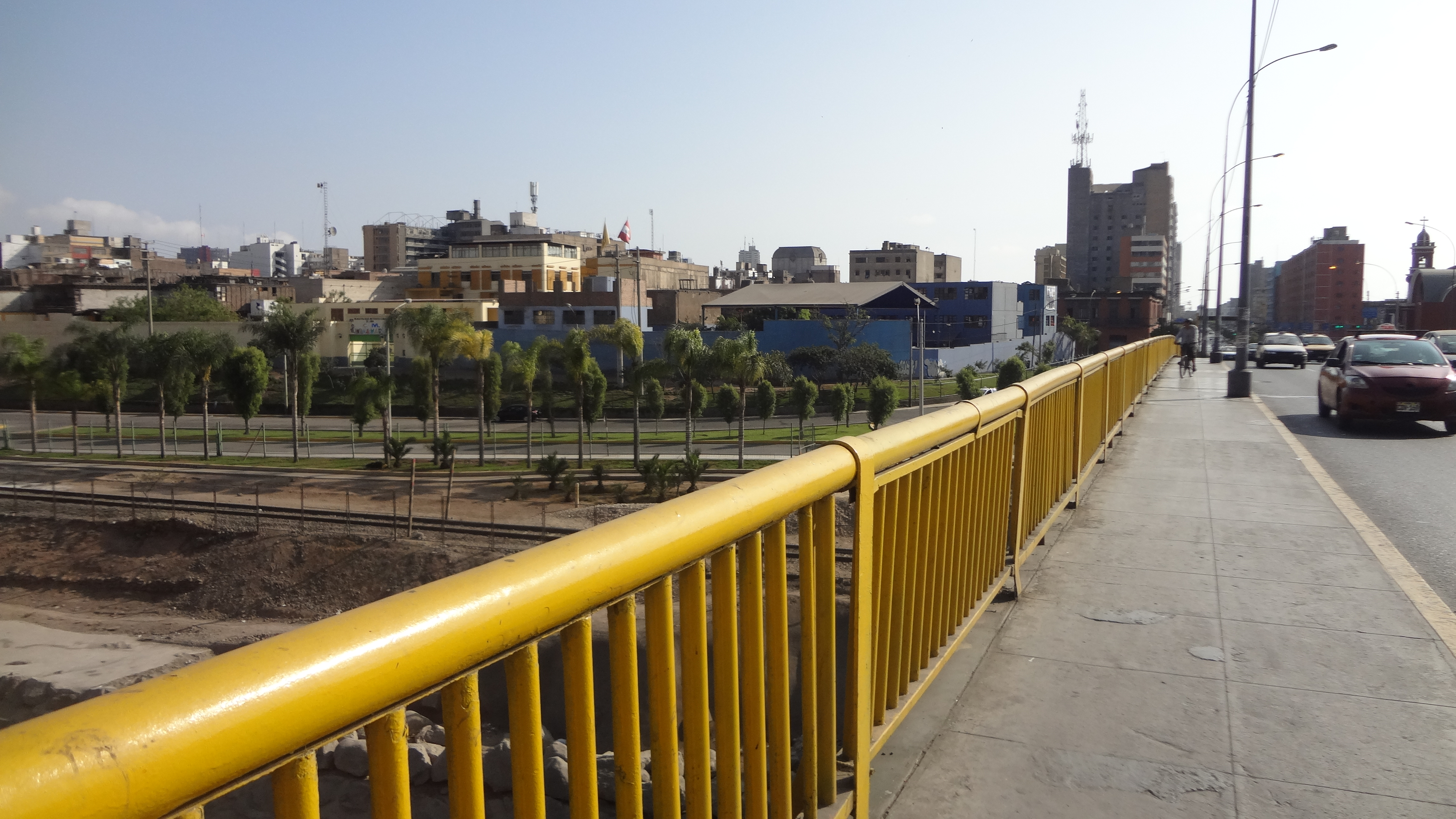
- Coordinates: 12°02′29″S 77°02′02″W
- Crosses: Rímac river
- Begins: Tacna Avenue
- Ends: Jirón Virú
- Other name(s): Tacna Bridge
- Named for: Rose of Lima

History
- Architect: Ernesto Aramburú
- Inaugurated: 30 August 1960

St. Rose Bridge (Spanish: Puente Santa Rosa) is one of the main bridges located in the historic centre of Lima, Peru. It connects Lima with Rímac District and follows the path of Tacna Avenue. It is named after the Sanctuary of Saint Rose of Lima, located next to its southern entrance.

== History ==
The bridge was preceded by the nearby "la Puente de Palo" (lit. trans. the stick-bridge), a rudimentary wooden bridge that still existed by 1962 built by the Viceroy Marquis of Cañete to connect what was then the neighbourhood of San Lázaro with the city of Lima. The construction was carried out at the request of Conquistador Jerónimo de Aliaga, with the finished product being a narrow bridge, through which only one person could pass at a time. It was the first "firm" bridge in the city (despite the fact that it had replaced a brick bridge destroyed by flooding in 1607), and connected the neighbourhood of Monserrat through its main square to the other side of the river.

The new bridge was formally inaugurated on August 30, 1960. During the opening ceremony, speeches were given by Héctor García Ribeyro, then mayor of Lima, and Manuel Prado Ugarteche, then president of Peru who was accompanied by First Lady Clorinda Málaga, with whom he travelled from one side to the other in his car once the ceremony had concluded. Also present in the ceremony were the Archbishop of Lima, Juan Landázuri Ricketts, and auxiliary bishop José Antonio Dammert Bellido. The architect in charge of the project was Ernesto Aramburú Menchaca.

== See also ==
- Puente de Piedra
- Ricardo Palma Bridge
