= Public Ministry of Peru Building =

Headquarters of the Public Ministry of Peru

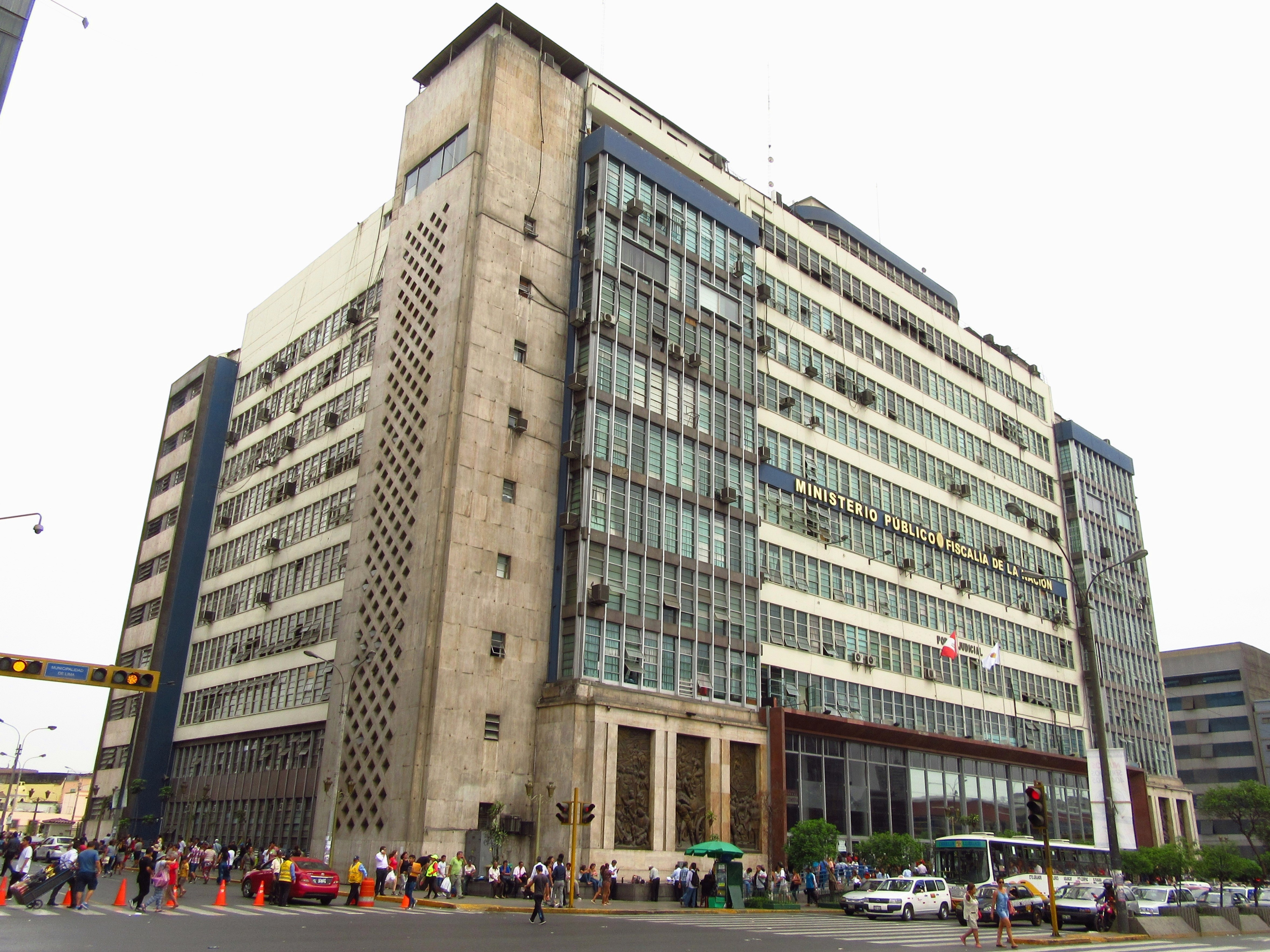
- Interactive map of the Public Ministry of Peru Building area

General information
- Architectural style: Modernist
- Location: Av. Abancay, cuadra 5
- Year built: 1952
- Cost: S/. 25 million

Technical details
- Material: Marble (exterior)

Design and construction
- Architect: Guillermo Payet

The Building of the Ministry of Finance and Commerce (Spanish: Edificio del Ministerio de Hacienda y Comercio) is one of the largest buildings located in Abancay Avenue in the historic centre of Lima. Surrounded by Santa Rosa, Cuzco and Ayacucho (formerly Urubamba) streets, it serves as the headquarters of the Public Ministry of Peru.

== History ==
The building was built in 1952, during the government of Manuel Odría, and is the work of architect Guillermo Payet, who conceived the design according to the modernist movement, occupying an entire block of Abancay Avenue, at the time of its widening.

The tender for the construction of the building was awarded in December 1949 to the firm Gramonvel S. A. for a budget of S/. 25 million, and with a completion period of 24 months.

Its exterior is decorated in marble, with a series of bas-reliefs on the front, the work of Artemio Ocaña and Luis Felipe Agurto Olaya. The interior, on the entrance level that faces the main avenue, has a mural by Teodoro Núñez Ureta in the lobby.

During the 2022 protests against the government of Dina Boluarte, the building was attacked on different occasions by protesters.

== See also ==
- Abancay Avenue
