= Avenida Abancay =

Street in Lima, Peru

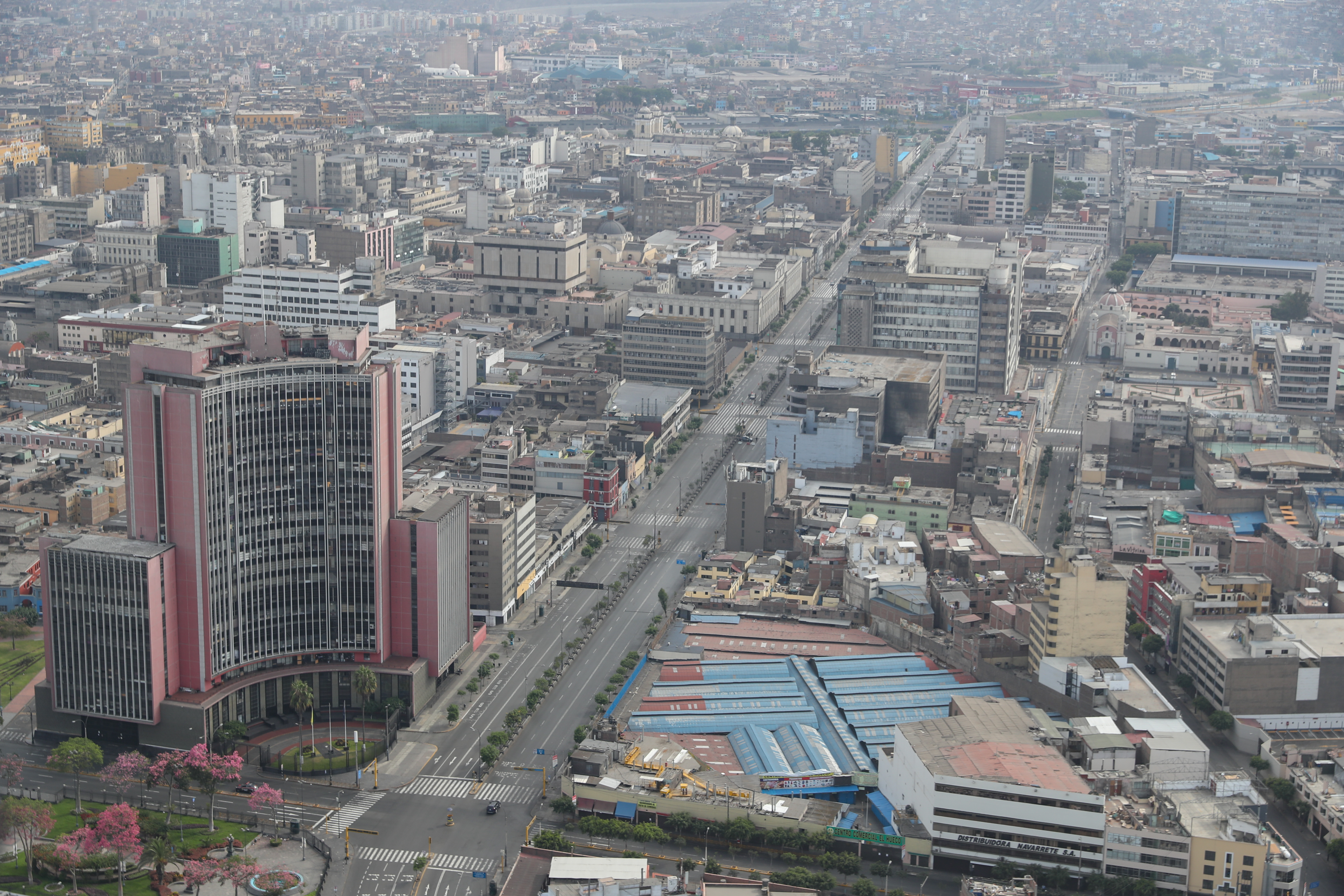
- Interactive map of Avenida Abancay
- Part of: Damero de Pizarro
- Namesake: Abancay province
- From: Ricardo Palma Bridge
- Major junctions: Jirón Amazonas, Jirón Áncash, Jirón Junín, Jirón Huallaga, Jirón Ucayali, Jirón Santa Rosa, Jirón Cuzco, Jirón Puno, La Colmena
- To: Miguel Grau Avenue

Construction
- Completion: 1535

Abancay Avenue (Spanish: Avenida Abancay), formerly known as Abancay Street (Spanish: Jirón Abancay), is a major avenue that serves as the limit between the Damero de Pizarro and Barrios Altos, both located in the Historic Centre of Lima, Peru. The street starts at Ricardo Palma Bridge and continues for 11 blocks until it reaches Miguel Grau Avenue.

Formerly a street (jirón), it was widened in 1947 under the government of Manuel A. Odría and buildings were built to house the ministries of economy and education. It is currently the second most congested artery in the city due to the circulation of 43 public transportation routes, in addition to private transportation. This makes it one of the roads with the greatest environmental and noise pollution in the city.

== History ==
The road that today constitutes the street was laid by Francisco Pizarro when he founded the city of Lima on January 18, 1535. In 1862, when a new urban nomenclature was adopted, the road was named jirón Arequipa. Prior to this renaming, each block (cuadra) had a unique name:

- Block 1: Juan de la Coba, after the man of the same name who lived there in the 17th century.
- Block 2: Trapitos, for reasons not known.
- Block 3: Compás de la Concepción, after the part of the convent of the same name not yet built, known as a compás.
- Block 4: Cascarilla, after the fever-treating bark of the same name sold by the Jesuits.
- Block 5: Santa María, after the title of the noble family that lived there. The Public Ministry Building is located here.
- Block 6: Sagástegui, possibly also "Sagasti" or "Zugasti" after people who possibly lived there.
- Block 7: Pileta de Santa Teresa, after the church of the same name. The area's appearance was heavily affected by the widening programme.
- Block 8: Hospicio de Cándamo.
- Block 9: Zepita.

With the street widening programme in the 20th century, new blocks were created along the avenue.

- When the avenue was expanded to the north, through the Convent of San Francisco, the current first block was created.
- When the eastern section of Nicolás de Piérola Avenue was created, Hospicio de Cándamo Street was divided, forming the current block 10 of the avenue.

== See also ==
- Historic Centre of Lima
