= La Pampilla, Peru =

Beach in Peru

Coordinates: 12.1250°S 77.0398°W

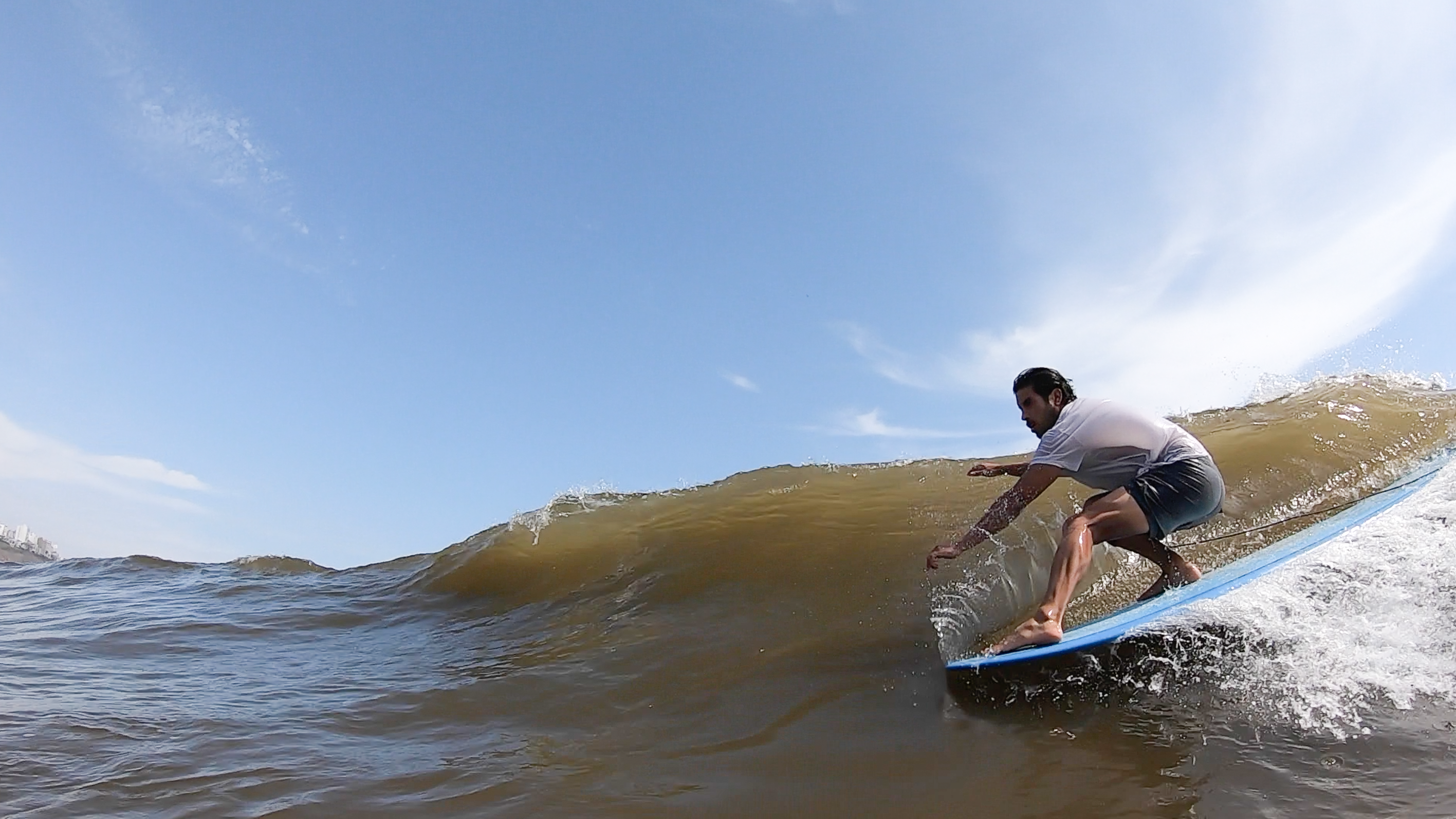
Surfing at the beach

La Pampilla is a beach located in Miraflores District, Lima and is part of the Costa Verde beach circuit in Peru. It is used as a surfing area and balneario by the residents of the districts near the beach since the early 1970s. It is considered a cradle of Peruvian surfers.

It is protected by the state since April 8, 2016 from Directorial Resolution No. 0220-2016 of the Peruvian Navy, within the framework of the Breakwater Law.

Pollution with solid waste and drainage into the water and on the beach is frequent.

== Overview ==
The beach is 350 m long and is covered with pebble stones. The wave break goes to the right and can reach up to 2 m high. The wave is popular all year round for all types of surfers and board sizes: for both newbies and veterans, and from shortboards to longboards.

National and international board and padel championships have been held, such as the La Pampilla Longboard Classic, held annually since 2014 or the Campeonato Mundial ISA de StandUp Paddle (SUP) y Paddleboard in 2012 and 2013.

In 2017, lights were installed that make it possible to surf the waves at night.

=== Conservation status ===
The contamination of the waters and shores in La Pampilla with fecal coliforms, construction and domestic waste is frequent due to the poor management of garbage and drainage by some Lima districts such as Villa El Salvador, Magdalena del Mar, Villa María del Triunfo and Chorrillos.

In 2015, the Municipality of Lima placed boulders on the beach without authorisation, leading to opposition and their ultimate removal with an apology by then mayor Luis Castañeda.

The Peruvian government passed the "breakwater law" in 2016 to protect it from infrastructure efforts and other threats.

== See also ==
- Costa Verde (Peru)
- Marine pollution
- Beach cleaning
