= Jirón Cuzco =

Street in Lima, Peru

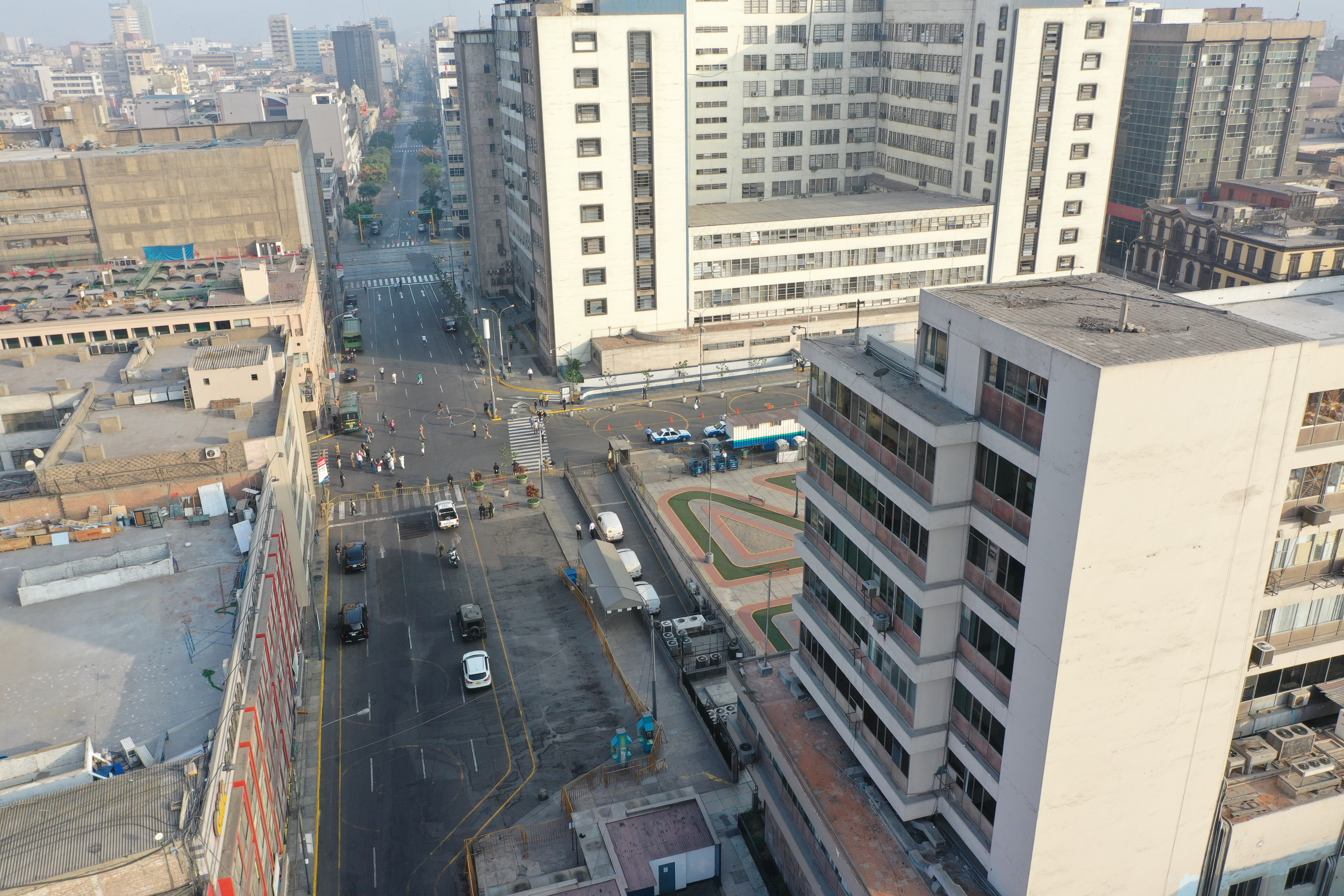
- Intersection with Jirón Ayacucho, behind the Building of the Public Ministry
- Part of: Damero de Pizarro
- Namesake: Department of Cuzco
- From: Jirón de la Unión
- To: Jirón Huánuco

Construction
- Completion: 1535

Jirón Cuzco is a major street in the Damero de Pizarro, located in the historic centre of Lima, Peru. The street starts at its intersection with the Jirón de la Unión and continues until it reaches Jirón Huánuco in Barrios Altos.

== History ==
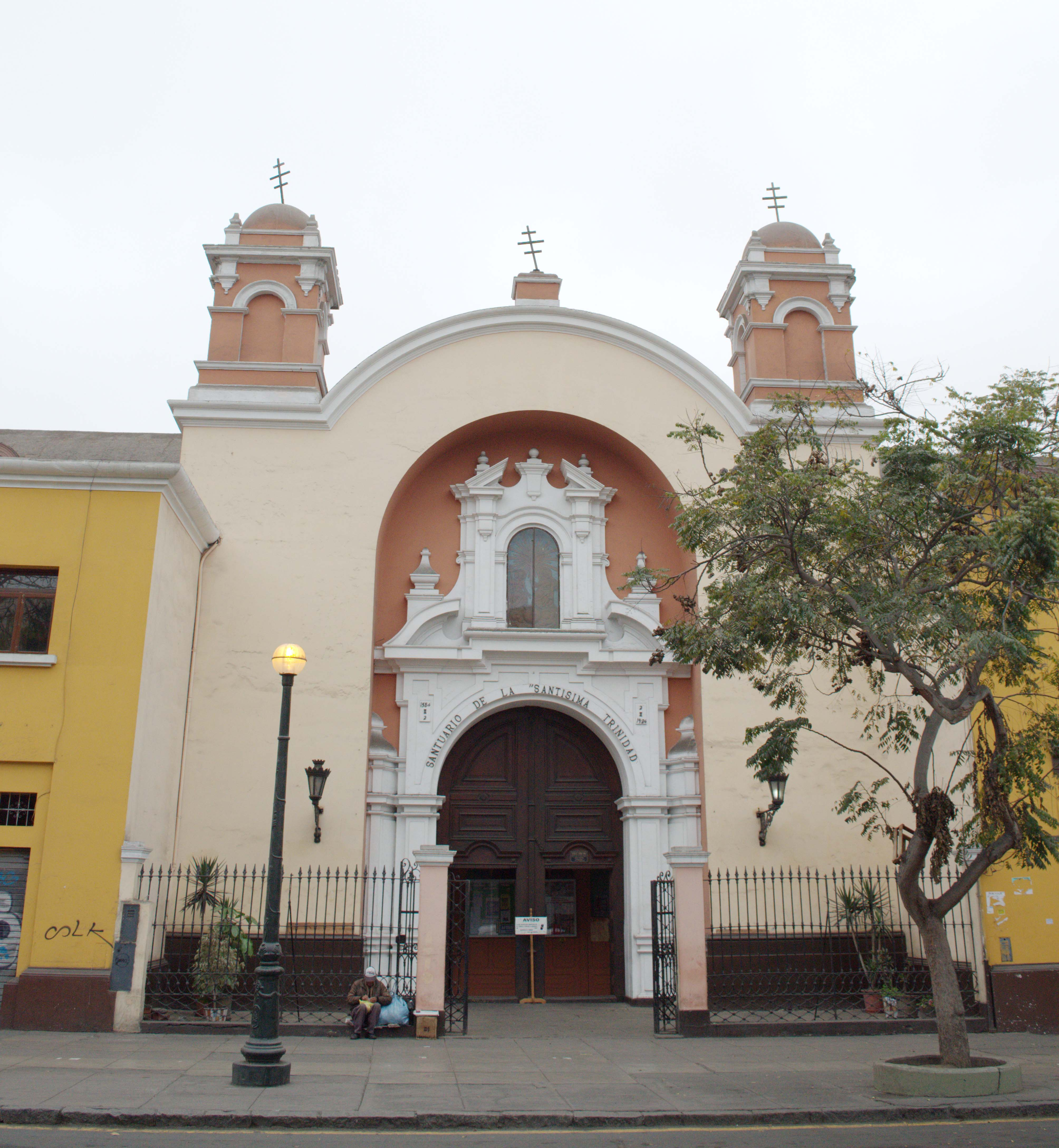
The church and monastery in block 3.

The road that today constitutes the street was laid by Francisco Pizarro when he founded the city of Lima on January 18, 1535. In 1862, when a new urban nomenclature was adopted, the road was named jirón Cuzco, after the department of Cuzco. Prior to this renaming, each block (cuadra) had a unique name:

- Block 1: Espalda de la Pileta de la Merced, after the fountain of the convent of the same name.
- Block 2: Higuera, after either the fig trees or one of the families of the same name.
- Block 3: Trinidad, after the convent of the same name.
- Block 4: Corcovado, after a doctor of the city (according to José Gálvez Barrenechea.
- Block 5: Mascarón, possibly a bastardisation of a butler's name.
- Block 6: Zamudio, after the Zamudio de las Infantas family, who lived there. Alternatively, it was known as the Callejón del Gigante, after Juan Núñez, a Huamanga-born mestizo known for his large height.
- Block 7: San Pedro Nolasco, after the school and convent of the same name. Alternatively known as Llanis, for reasons unknown.
- Block 8: Granados, after either the pomegranate trees or one of the families of the same name.
- Block 9: Tobal, after the tuff (toba) that had formed on the street.
- Block 10: Pampa de Lara, after the family of the same name.

The street passes through the Mesa Redonda shopping district, best known for its pyrotechnics industry. Consequently, it has been the location of the district's fires, most notably the 2001 fire, and most recently in 2019 and 2021.

== See also ==
- Historic Centre of Lima
- Avenida Emancipación
- Jirón de la Unión (Metropolitano), located on the street
