= Ricardo Palma Bridge =

Bridge in Lima, Peru

Ricardo Palma Bridge Puente Ricardo Palma
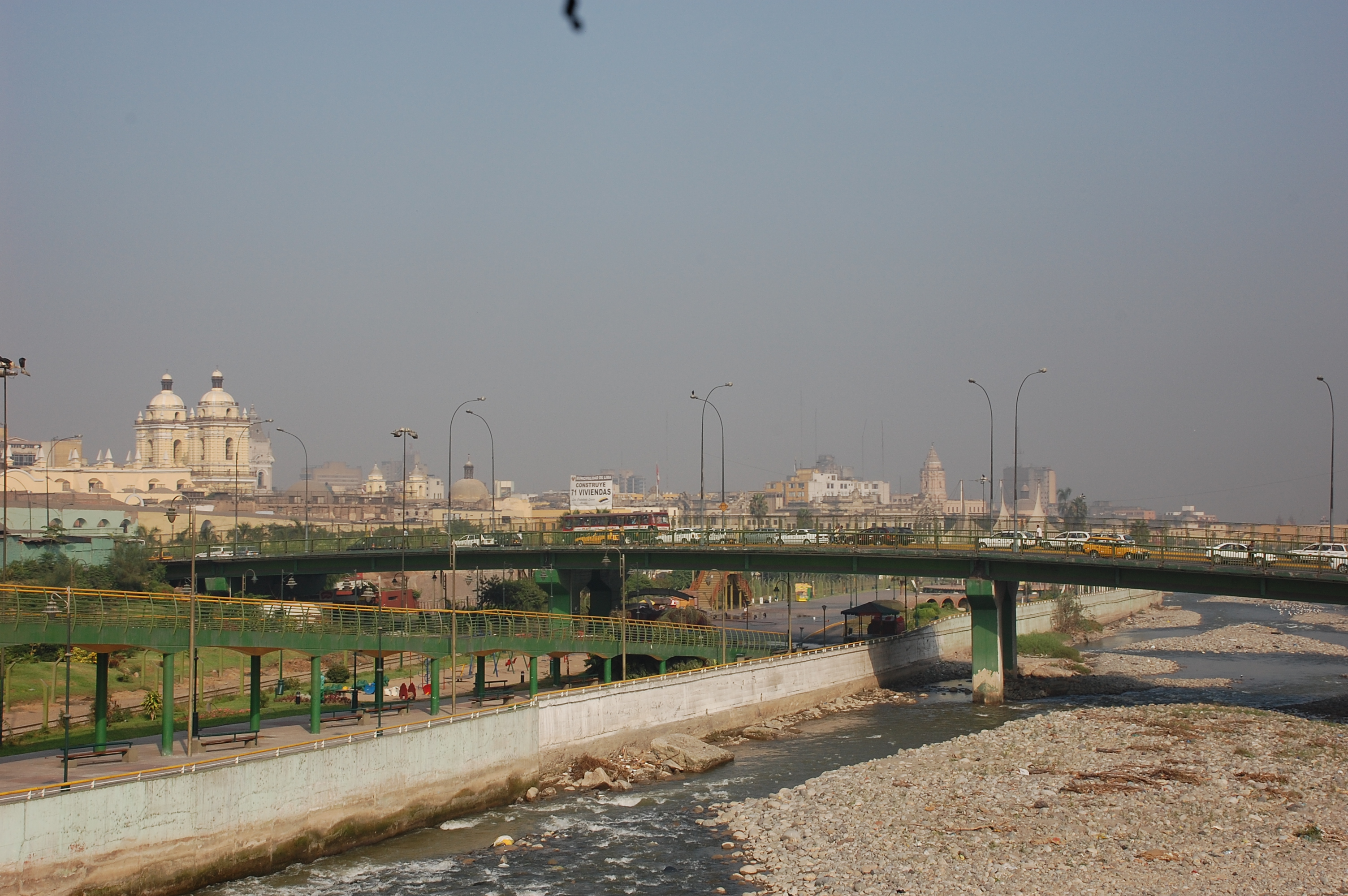
- The bridge in 2008
- Coordinates: 12°02′36″S 77°01′28″W
- Crosses: Rímac River
- Begins: Abancay Avenue
- Ends: Jirón Hualgayoc
- Named for: Ricardo Palma
- Owner: Municipality of Lima
- Heritage status: Cultural heritage of Peru

Characteristics
- Design: Beam bridge
- Material: Reinforced concrete
- Load limit: 36 tons
- No. of lanes: 2

History
- Constructed by: Eduardo Gallo Deza
- Fabrication by: Ocampo y Cía, S.A.
- Construction end: December 1961
- Construction cost: S/. 15,309,576
- Inaugurated: January 18, 1962

Ricardo Palma Bridge (Spanish: Puente Ricardo Palma) is a reinforced concrete beam bridge that crosses the Rímac river, connecting Abancay Avenue with Jirón Hualgayoc and thus connecting the districts of Lima and Rímac, both part of the historic centre of Lima, the capital city of Peru. It is named after the Peruvian author, scholar, librarian and politician Ricardo Palma.

The bridge, alongside neighbouring St. Rose's Bridge, was one of two major additions to the Cercado de Lima, both carried out under the mayorality of Héctor García Ribeyro (1956–1962).

== History ==
The bridge's construction was authorised on October 5, 1959, and was completed in December 1961 as the second bridge to be adapted to the road network of the city, connecting Abancay Avenue with Hualgayoc street (the first was Saint Rose Bridge, which connected Tacna Avenue with Jirón Virú). Its construction was overseen by engineer Eduardo Gallo Deza, and carried out by construction firm Ocampo y Cía, S.A. following AASHO regulations, costing about S/. 15,309,576 in total.

It was officially inaugurated on January 18, 1962—the 427th anniversary of the foundation of the city—by Héctor García Ribeyro, then Mayor of Lima (1956–62), during an opening ceremony involving major figures of the city's municipal government and the general public. Archbishop of Lima Juan Landázuri Ricketts blessed the bridge and the mayor of Rímac District thanked García Ribeyro, who later cut a red-white-red ribbon in front of a large crowd.

In 2019, a bus stop was formally established on the bridge by the Urban Transportation Management as part of its new Corredor Morado bus route. The route was extended in 2022, but was interrupted by anti-government protests in 2023. During said protests, tear gas was deployed after the police perimeter in Abancay Avenue was breached, with the crowd using the bridge to leave the area. The protests interrupted the aforementioned Corredor Morado.

== Overview ==
The bridge is made up of two nine-metre lanes separated by a curb and is prepared to withstand a load of up to 36 tons on each traffic line. It follows an almost straight line, with a curvature of 25 degrees considering the river's natural path and passes over the railway of the Ferrocarril Central Andino.

It has a total length of 356 metres, of which 58 correspond to the right-side access and 113 m to the left-side's, with the span measured at 185 m. The span between the bridge's abutments is divided in five parts with four piers measured at 37 metres long. The bridge's total width is measured at 23 metres, divided into two nine-metre vehicle lanes and two pedestrian lanes, 2.35 metres long. The curb's length is half a metre long.

The bridge reaches a total height of seven metres above the river, and its aluminum railings and lighting system are identical to the ones used at neighbouring St. Rose bridge.

== See also ==
- Abancay Avenue
- Puente Santa Rosa
