= Miraflores District, Lima =

District of Lima, Peru

Miraflores
- District
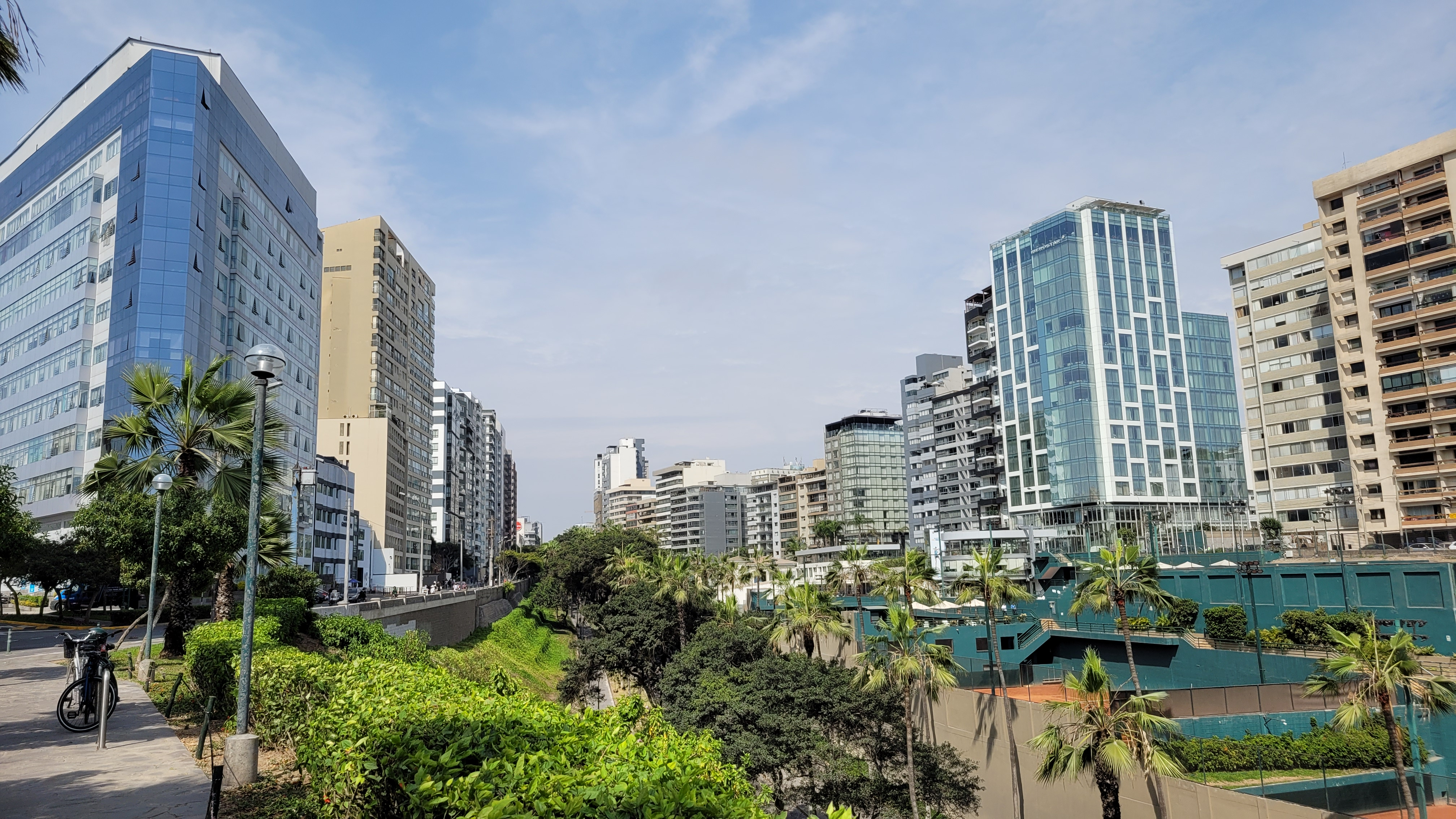
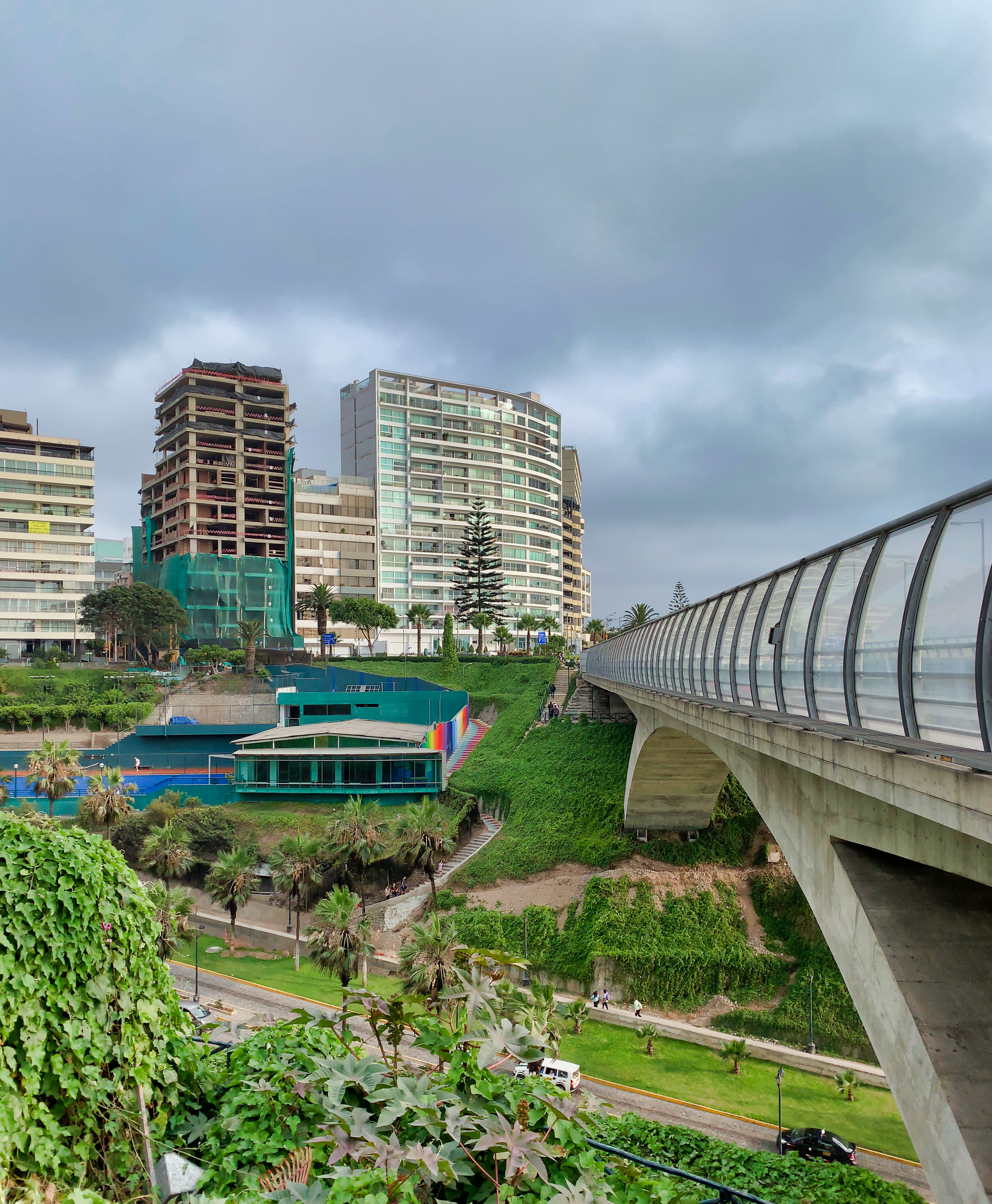
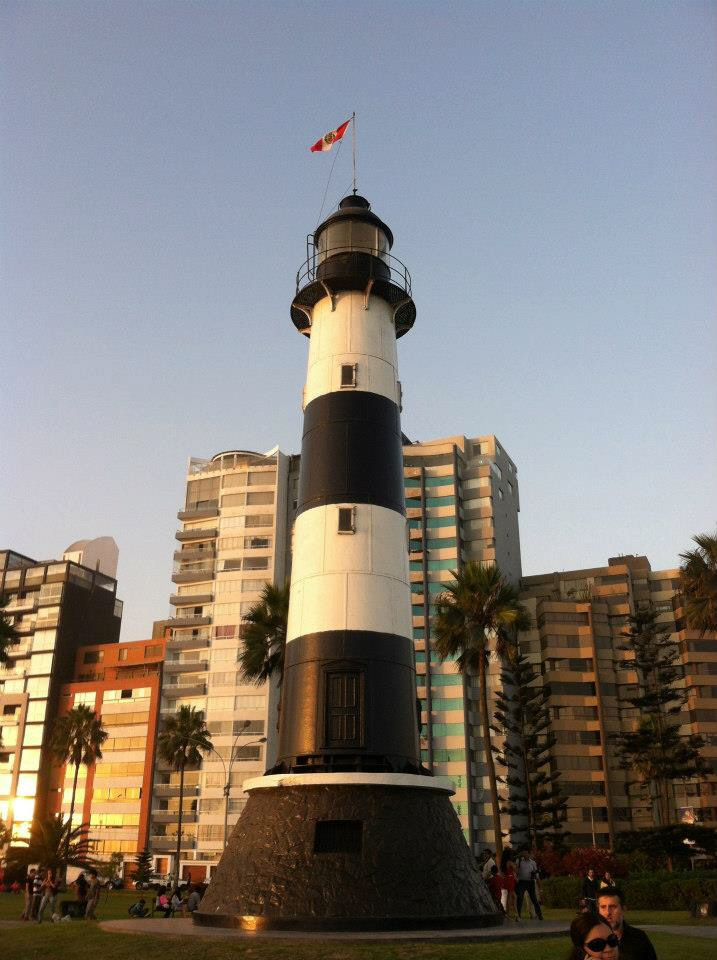
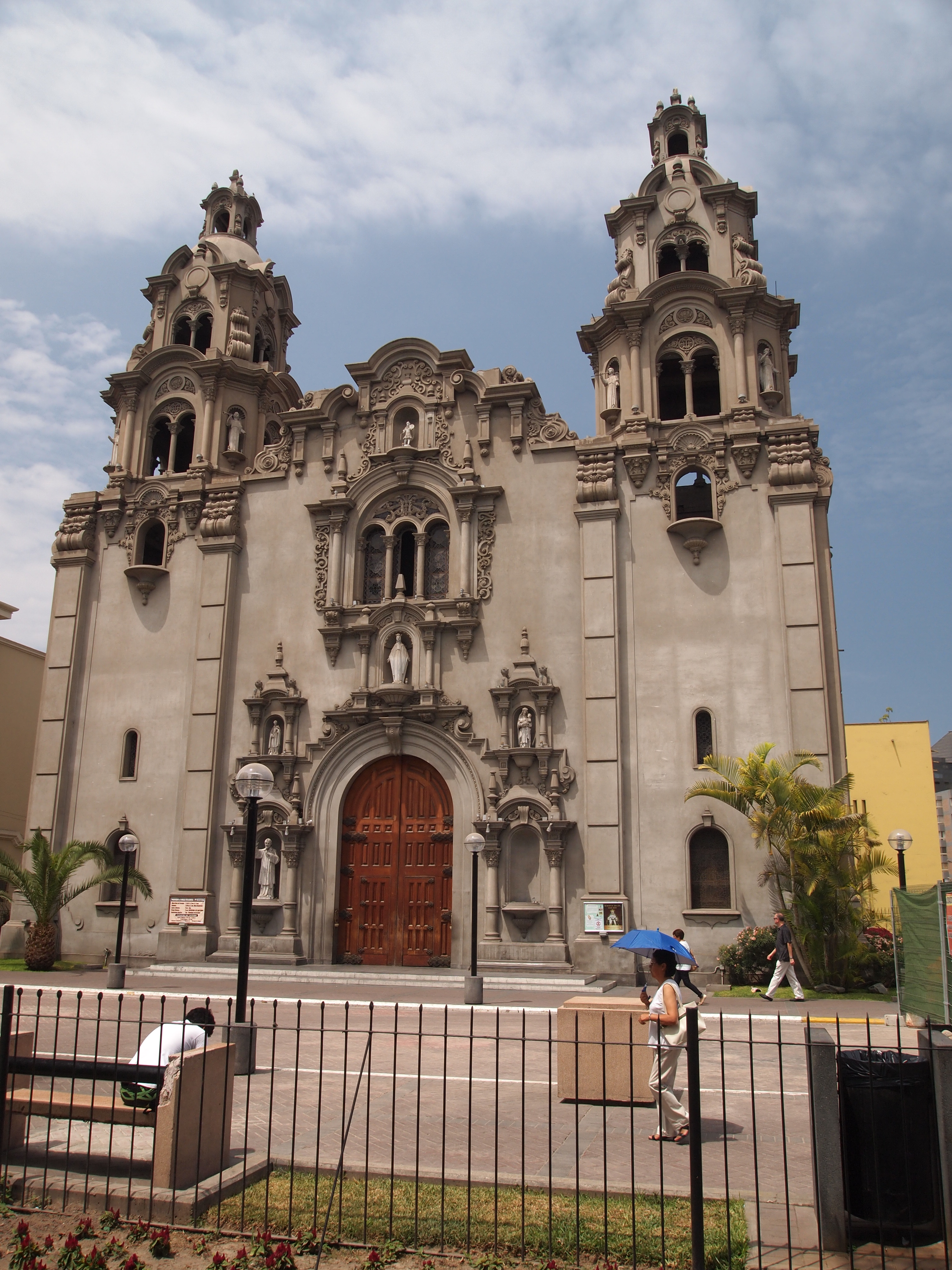
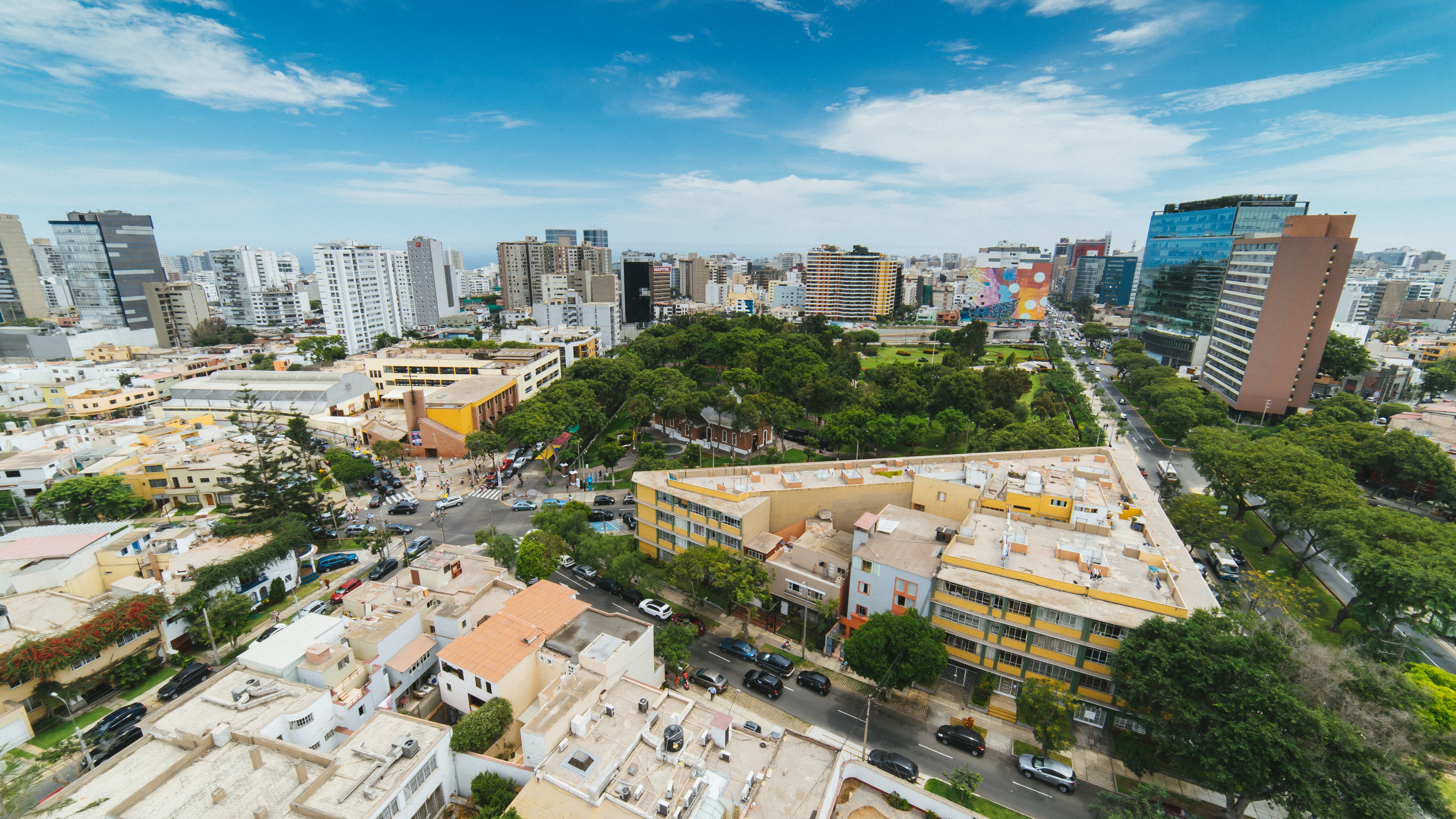

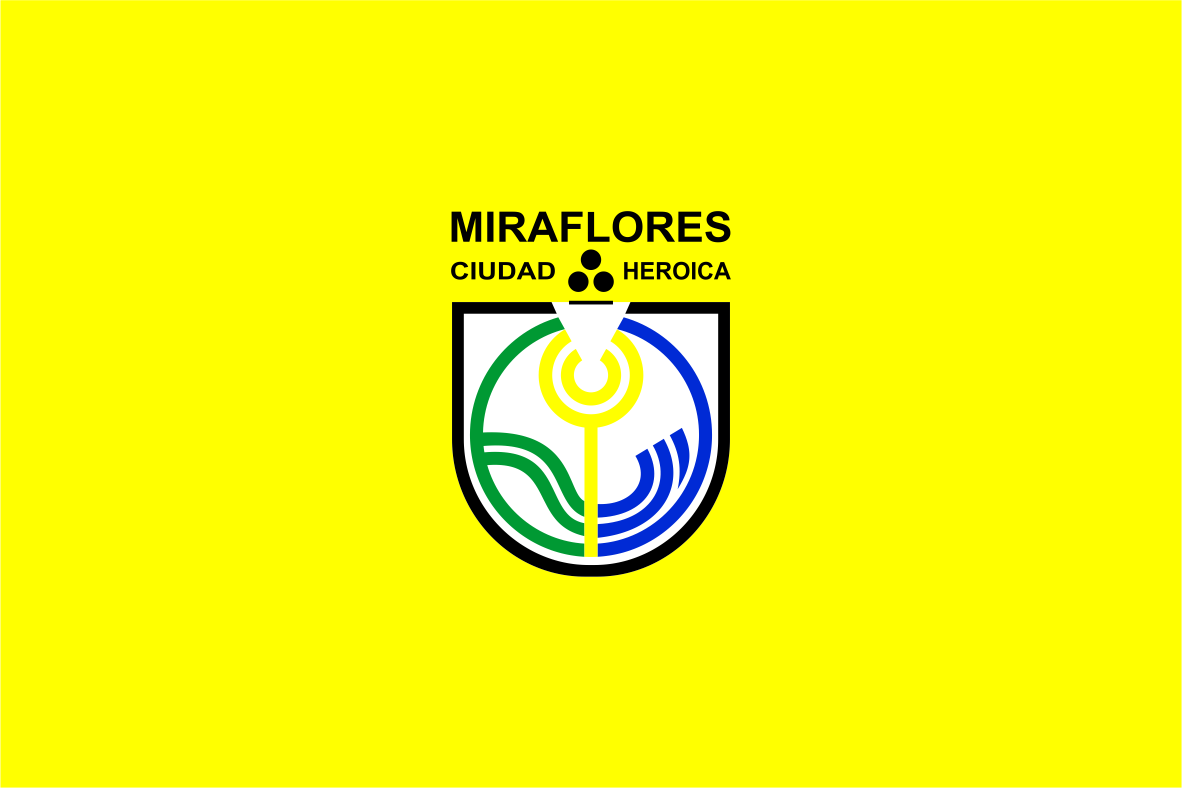
- Flag Coat of arms

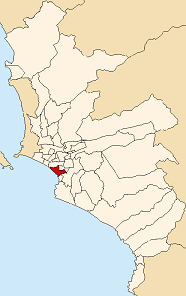
- Location of Miraflores in Peru
- Coordinates: 12°07′03″S 77°02′35″W
- Country: Peru
- Department: Lima
- Province: Lima
- Founded: January 2, 1857

Government
  - Mayor: Carlos Canales

Area
  - Total: 9.62 km^{2} (3.71 sq mi)
- Elevation: 79 m (259 ft)

Population (2023)
  - Total: 116,526
  - Density: 12,100/km^{2} (31,400/sq mi)
- Time zone: UTC-5 (PET)
- UBIGEO: 150122
- Website: miraflores.gob.pe

Miraflores (Spanish: [miɾaˈfloɾes]) is a district of Lima, Peru. A residential and upscale shopping district, it is one of the wealthiest districts that make up the city of Lima, located to the south of the city's historic downtown area, as well as one of its main tourist destinations. The area also hosts office buildings and flat-roofed multi-coloured housing.

It was first established as a district on January 2, 1857. As a result of the January 1881 Battle of Miraflores fought during the War of the Pacific, Miraflores is called Ciudad Heroica ("Heroic City").

== Etymology ==
Founded as San Miguel de Miraflores, the district is named after the Miraflores Charterhouse and its patron saint, Saint Michael the Archangel. The Encyclopædia Britannica also claims that its present, shortened name (lit. 'look at the flowers'), is due to the nearly year-round bougainvillea bloom.

== History ==
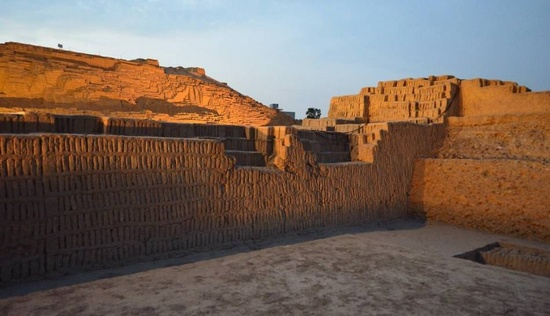
Huaca Pucllana, Miraflores

Prior to the arrival of the Spanish, Miraflores was one of the locations inhabited by members of the ancient Lima culture, which preceded the Inca Empire. The Huaca Pucllana (formerly Hispanicized as Juliana) serves as its only remaining remnant in the district, originally much larger in size.

Once Spanish rule was established, the area became part of the district of Magdalena Vieja. Established as San Miguel de Miraflores, the area was originally an Indian reduction administered by the Mercedarians. It became a district on January 2, 1857 under the presidency of Ramón Castilla and containing a number of estates (Armendáriz, Balconcillo, Barboncito, La Palma, Conde San Isidro, Lince, Limatambo, Santa Cruz and Chacarilla), as well as the lands at Leuro and Ocharán.

Miraflores was the site of encounters between José de San Martín and Viceroy Pezuela that took place during the Peruvian War of Independence, on September 24, 1820. During the War of the Pacific, the district was the site of the eponymous battle, where two thousand people died as a result, and the district was sacked and burned by the Chilean Army. In 1898, it was limited to the north by the lands of the Surquillo estate, to the west by Bellavista street, to the east by the railroad tracks that reached Lima, and to the south by the first blocks of Larco and Porta streets.

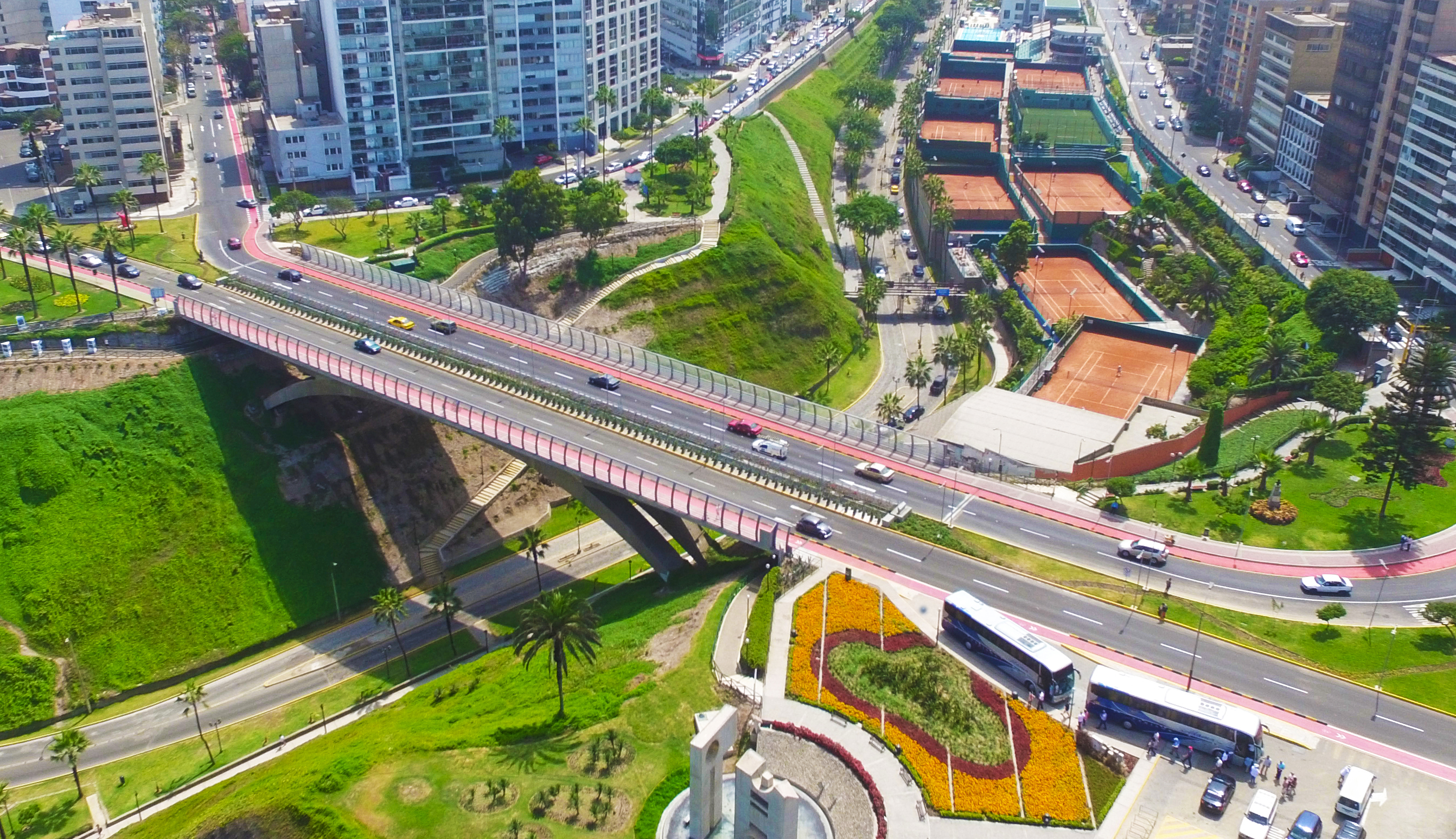
Puente Villena Rey

As the city of Lima grew, Miraflores was absorbed into its metropolitan area during the early 20th century. Prior to the 1920s, its territory included the current districts of La Victoria (1920), San Isidro (1931), Lince (1936), part of Santiago de Surco (1944), Surquillo (1949), San Luis (1968) and San Borja (1983).

During the 1940s, the Iglesia Matriz Virgen Milagrosa was built next to the district's central park, replacing the original San Miguel de Miraflores Church.

On July 16, 1992, during the era of terrorism, a street in the district was targeted in a terrorist attack perpetrated by the Shining Path, which led to a crackdown on Peruvian insurgent groups, culminating in the group's leader being captured on September of the same year. The Tarata bombing was one of the largest attacks in the country and occurred near Avenida Larco. A monument was constructed at the site of the attack.

== Politics ==
Miraflores is under the jurisdiction of its own district municipality, as well as that of the Metropolitan Municipality of Lima.

=== List of mayors ===
Since 2023, the incumbent mayor is Carlos Canales.

Mayor	Party	Term	
Mayor	Party	Begin	End
1857–1865: No data
Francisco de la Cruz Marmolefo	—N/a	1886	?
1867–1880: No data
Guillermo Scheel (Note: Later known as "Schell".)	—N/a	1881	1881
Tomás Carbajal	—N/a	1881	1881
1881–1883: Recess in functions
Pedro F. Denegri	—N/a	1884	1886
Enrique F. Revett (Note: Also known as Henry Revett.)	—N/a	1886	1889
Carlos Sotomayor	—N/a	1889	1889
Javier Conroy	—N/a	1889	1890
José Larco y Bruno	—N/a	1891	1893
Eleodoro Romero	—N/a	1893	1895
Javier Conroy	—N/a	1895	1897
Augusto Angulo	—N/a	1897	1903
Enrique F. Revett	—N/a	1903	1908
Leonidas Cáceres Menacho	—N/a	1908	1909
Belisario Suárez y Vargas	—N/a	1910	1910
Juan A. Figari	—N/a	1910	1912
Francisco Tudela y Varela	—N/a	1912	1913
Luis Gonzáles del Riego	—N/a	1913	1913
Francisco Tudela y Varela	—N/a	1913	1915
Genaro Castro Iglesias	—N/a	1915	1917
Jorge A. Buckley	—N/a	1918	1918
Luis Gonzáles del Riego	—N/a	1918	1919
Alfredo Álvarez Calderón	—N/a	1919	1920
Nicolás Salazar Orfila	—N/a	1920	1922
Luis Arias Schreiber	—N/a	1922	1924
Sebastián Salinas Cossío	—N/a	1924	1925
Manuel B. Sayán Palacios	—N/a	1925	1927
Alejandro J. Figari	—N/a	1927	1927
Guillermo Correa Elías	—N/a	1927	1929
Luis Gallo Porras	—N/a	1930	1933
Eduardo Villena Rey	—N/a	1934	1937
Emilio Fort	—N/a	1937	1938
Eduardo Villena Rey	—N/a	1938	1939
Daniel Ruzo de los Heros	—N/a	1940	1942
Carlos Alzamora Elster	—N/a	1942	1944
Guillermo Ureta del Solar	—N/a	1945	1946
Alicia Cox de Larco	—N/a	1946	1947
Julio César Gonzáles La Hoz	—N/a	1948	1949
Emilio Harth Terré	—N/a	1950	1951
Ivan H. Blume	—N/a	1952	1955
Augusto Leguía Ross	—N/a	1956	1956
Ernesto Araujo Álvarez Reyna	—N/a	1956	1957
Juan Bautista Isola	—N/a	1957	1957
Carlos Alzamora Traverso	—N/a	1957	1959
Emilio Rodríguez Larraín	Partido Liberal	1959	1961
Emilio Rodríguez Larraín	Partido Liberal	1961	1963
Mario Cabrejos Quiñonez	AP–DC	1964	1966
Juan José Vega	AP–DC	1967	1967
Rafael Sánchez-Aizcorbe	AP–DC	1967	1969
Ernesto Aramburú Menchaca	PPC	1970	1976
Santos Hinostroza		1976	1976
Carlos Arca Betancourt		1976	1977
Guillermo Schwarztman		1977	1978
César de Cárdenas Rovaretto		1978	1979
Carlos Drago Garibaldi		1979	1979
Julio Balbuena Camino		1979	1979
Guillermo López Mavila		1979	1980
Carlos Cobilich Portocarrero		1980	1980
Luis Dorich Torres	—N/a	1980	1980
Jorge Rodríguez Larraín Pendergast	PPC	1981	1983
Luis Bedoya de Vivanco	PPC	1984	1986
Luis Bedoya de Vivanco		1987	1989
Alberto Andrade	FREDEMO	1990	1992
PPC	1993	1995	
Fernando Andrade	Somos Lima	1996	1998
Luis Bedoya de Vivanco	Lucho en Miraflores	1999	2001
Germán Krüger Espantoso	Lucho en Miraflores	2001	2002
Fernando Andrade	Somos Perú	2003	2006
Manuel Masías	UN	2007	2010
Jorge Muñoz Wells	Somos Perú	2011	2014
Jorge Muñoz Wells	Somos Perú	2015	2018
Luis Molina Arles	PSN	2019	2022
Carlos Canales Anchorena	RP	2023	Incumbent

=== Subdivisions ===
As of 2017, the district is divided into 50 neighborhoods (Spanish: urbanizaciones).

=== Twin cities ===
- Las Condes, Chile
- Pensacola, FL, since 1964, through the efforts of Captain Harold Grow
- Santa Barbara, CA, since March 2023
- Shibuya District, Tokyo, Japan, since 8 July 2024

== Geography ==
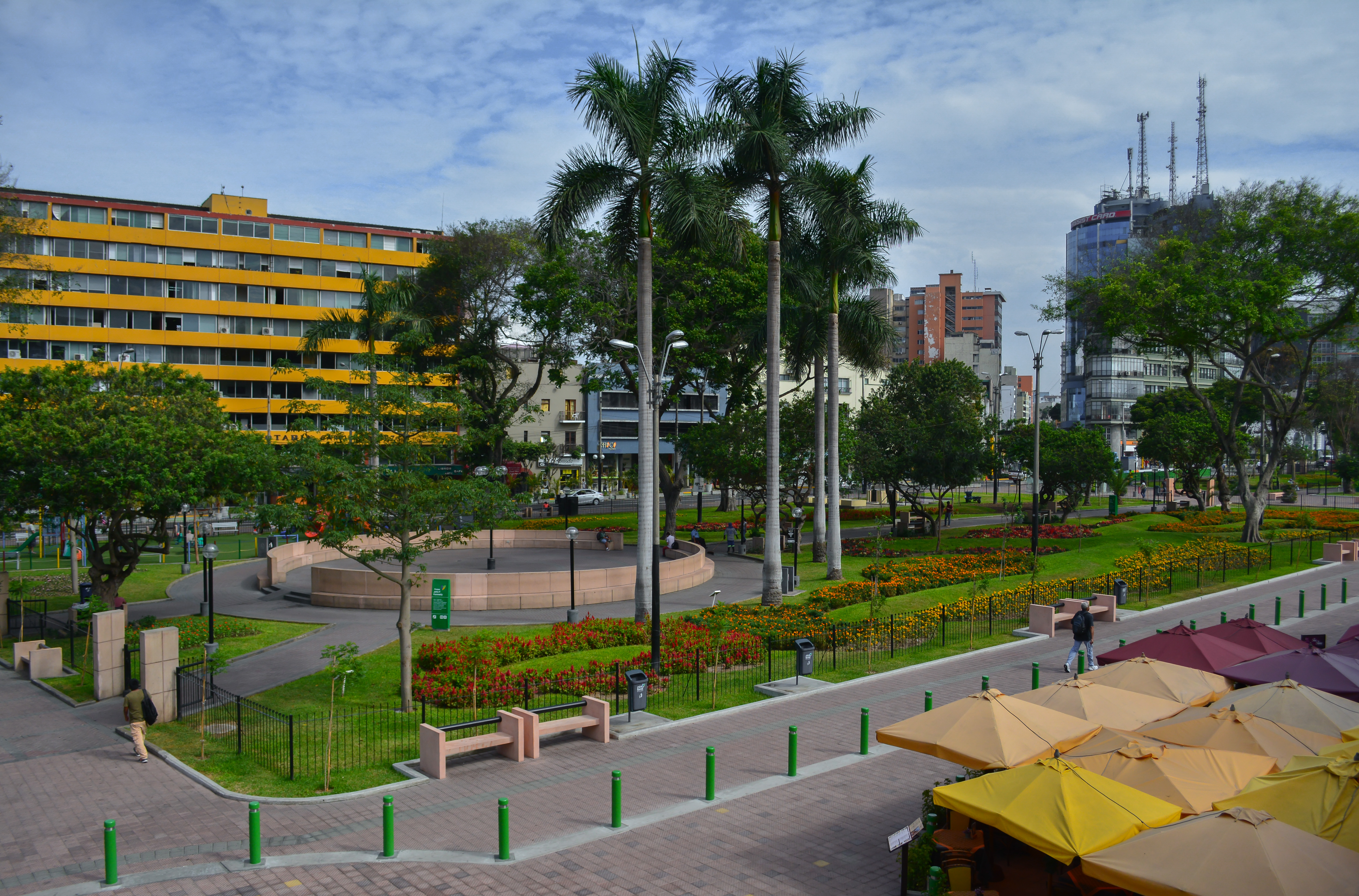
Miraflores Central Park (Parque Kennedy).

The district has a total land area of 9.62 km^{2}. Its administrative center is located 79 meters above sea level. It is part of Lima's Cono Centro, an unofficial subdivision of the city.

=== Boundaries ===
- North: San Isidro and Surquillo
- East: Surquillo and Santiago de Surco
- South: Barranco and Santiago de Surco
- West: Pacific Ocean

=== Climate ===
Miraflores has a marine climate, characterized by mild, humid, and comfortable conditions. Temperatures oscillate from 13 °C (55 °F) to 18 °C (64 °F) in winter, and from 20 °C (68 °F) to 30 °C (86 °F) in summer. Low clouds are frequent, especially during winter, when morning drizzles are not uncommon. Heavy rain is almost unseen.

Climate data for Lima
Month	Jan	Feb	Mar	Apr	May	Jun	Jul	Aug	Sep	Oct	Nov	Dec	Year
Record high °F	79	79	79	75	72	68	66	64	66	68	72	75	72
Record high °C	26	26	26	24	22	20	19	18	19	20	22	24	22
Average precipitation days	1	1	0	0	1	2	3	3	3	2	2	0	16
Average rainy days	4	2	3	2	5	11	12	15	13	7	5	3	82
Average relative humidity (%)	85	80	80	85	85	85	85	85	85	85	85	85	84.2
Mean monthly sunshine hours	179.1	169	139.2	184	116.4	50.6	28.6	32.3	37.3	65.3	89	139.2	1,284
Source: Weatherbase (Temperature, precipitation and humidity). and Universidad Complutense de Madrid (Sunlight)

== Ecology ==
Miraflores is a biodiverse district, with a large variety of animal species, including those off its coast, and over 200 species of plants. As of 2026, most plant species have been introduced into the country, while only a fifth are native to Peru. The most prevalent species are Schinus terebinthifolia, Tecomaria capensis, Schinus molle, and Tecoma stans.

== Demographics ==
According to the 2017 national census done by the INEI, the district has 99,337 inhabitants and a population density of 10,326 persons per km^{2} (26,744 persons per sq mile). Miraflores has a high Human Development Index at 0.986 and the lowest population living below the poverty line in Lima at 1.80%. Along with its northern neighbor, San Isidro, Miraflores is inhabited primarily by upper-class residents and is consistently listed as one of the most expensive districts in the country.

=== Education ===
Miraflores had 128 private schools and 12 public schools in 2010.

== Culture ==
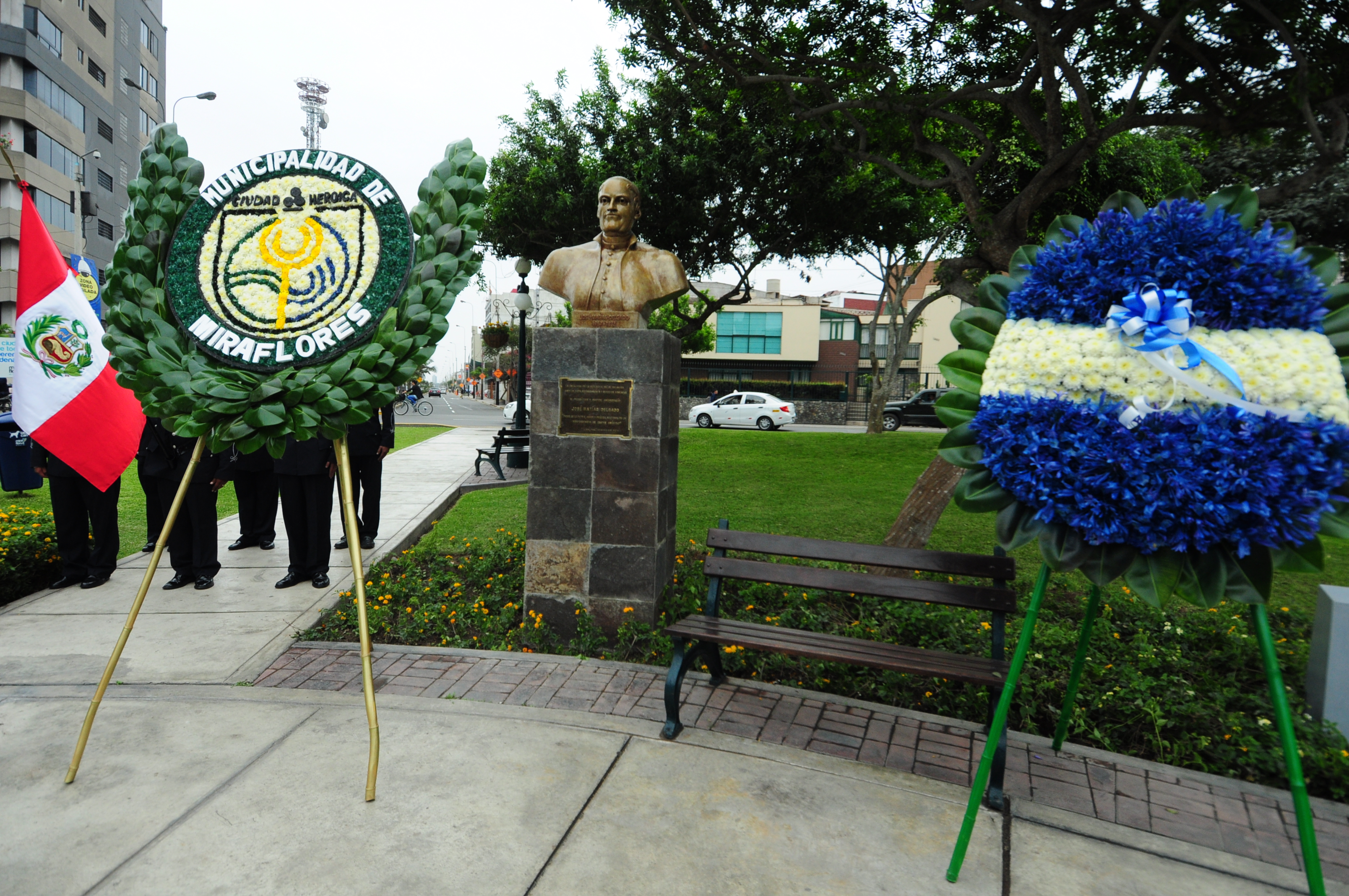
Unveiling of a bust of José Matías Delgado at Centroamérica Park.

The district has a pre-Inca mud-brick temple called the Huaca Pucllana, one of a number of archeological sites found in Lima.

=== Landmarks ===
Miraflores is home to a number of important locations, including buildings that have since been declared part of the cultural heritage of Peru.

== See also ==
- List of upscale shopping districts
