= General Corps of Volunteer Firefighters of Peru =

Volunteer firefighter corps in Peru

- Cuerpo General de Bomberos Voluntarios del Perú
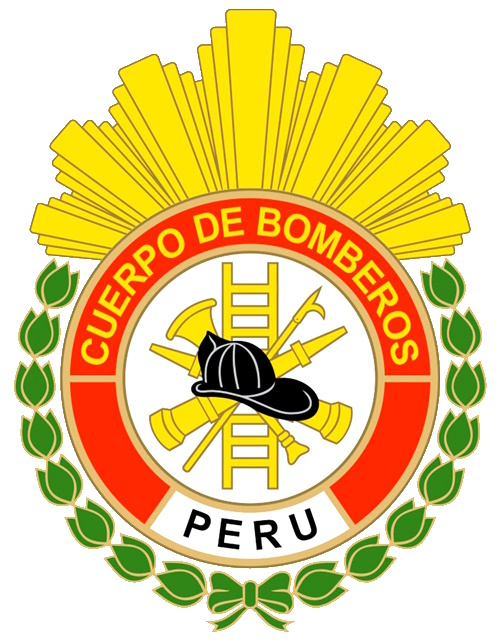

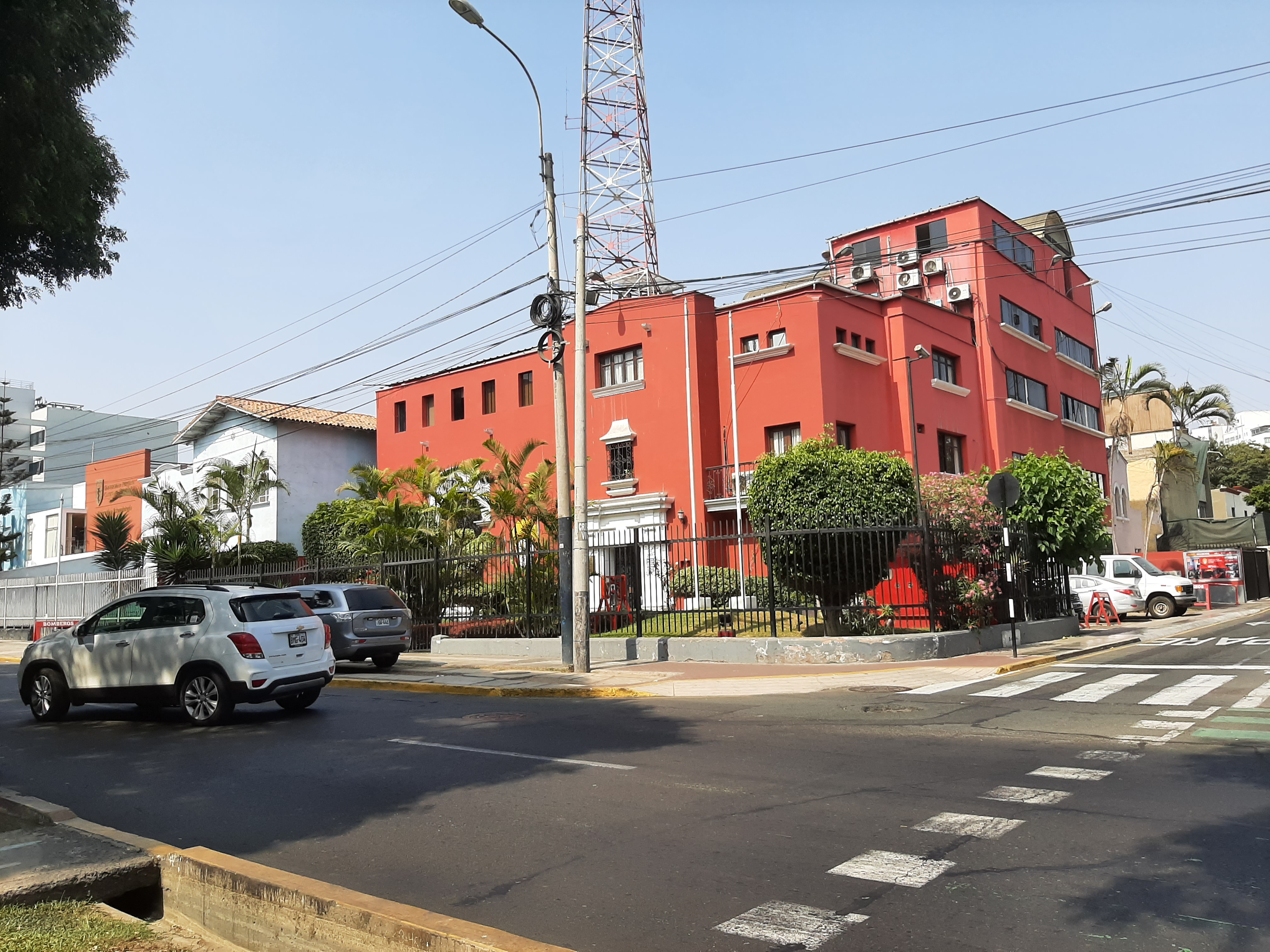
- General Command in San Isidro
- Abbreviation: CGBVP
- Predecessor: 170 volunteer companies
- Formation: December 2, 1953; 72 years ago (Note: Law No. 27067, which structures the CGBVP and continues to be in force, was published on March 10, 1999. The corps considers the foundation of the oldest volunteer firefighting corps on December 5, 1860, as its formal establishment date, a point in time acknowledged by local media outlets.)
- Founded at: Lima, Peru
- Type: Non-profit volunteer-based firefighting corps
- Purpose: Firefighting
- Headquarters: Salaverry 2495, San Isidro
- Origins: Company No. 1 (1860)
- Region served: Peru
- General Commander: Juan Carlos Morales
- Main organ: Boletín Institucional; El Bombero (1957–1970)
- Budget: S/. 94 million (2024)
- Funding: MININTER and MEF
- Volunteers: 16,000 (2024)
- Website: portal.bomberosperu.gob.pe

The General Corps of Volunteer Firefighters of Peru (Spanish: Cuerpo General de Bomberos Voluntarios del Perú; CGBVP) is a Peruvian non-profit volunteer-based firefighting organisation. Established in 1953, it dates its origins back to a number of firefighting companies established during the late 19th century that played important roles during the country's history.

The CGBVP's general command is headquartered at a traditional 20th-century building in Salaverry Avenue, in San Isidro District, Lima. It responds to the emergency telephone number 116.

== Background ==
Prior to the creation of a central institution, firefighting in Peru took place on a local and voluntary basis. The first volunteer fire department to be created in the country was Company "Paita" No. 1, established by Alejandro Blacker on November 24, 1860. The first companies to be subsequently established were as follows:

1. Company "Chalaca" No. 1, created in Callao on December 5, 1860.
2. Company "Roma" No. 2, created in Lima in 1866.
3. Company "France" No. 3, created in Lima in 1866.
4. Company "Lima" No. 4, created in Lima in 1866.
5. Company "Italia" No. 5, created in Callao in 1868.
6. Company "Garibaldi" No. 6, created in Chorrillos in 1872.
7. Company "Garibaldi" No. 7, created in Callao in 1873.
8. Company "Victoria" No. 8, created in Lima in 1873.
9. Company "Salvadora Callao" No. 9, created in Callao in 1873.
10. Company "Salvadora Lima" No. 10, created in Lima in 1874.
11. Company "Cosmopolita" No. 11, created in Lima in 1877.
12. Company "Mollendo" No. 12, created in Mollendo in 1886.
13. Company "Olaya" No. 13, created in Chorrillos in 1893.
14. Company "Internacional" No. 14, created in Lima in 1893.
15. Company "Callao" No. 15, created in Callao in 1894.
16. Company "Grau" No. 16, created in Barranco in 1898.

=== Company No. 1 ===
The Company "Chalaca" No. 1 was established by Britons residing in Peru through a request made to the municipal government, with Arturo (Arthur) M. Wholly and Enrique J. Prunier serving as the company's president and first secretary, respectively. The company put out its first fire on January 8, 1861, an event that took place at the stores owned by L. Sacón and J. Carbone in Peligro (today Castilla) Street. It merged with the Unión Social Club in 1868, being re-inaugurated under the name "Unión Chalaca" on July 26. Its current headquarters, located at 2 de Mayo 375, were inaugurated by Manuel Prado Ugarteche on December 5, 1961.

=== Companies No. 2, 3 & 4 ===
Companies No. 2 ("Roma"), 3 ("France") and 4 ("Lima") were established by local residents in response to a call by Pablo Antonio Salinas, then mayor of Lima, who anticipated the arrival of the Spanish Navy to Callao following their bombardment of Valparaíso due to the then-ongoing war. The three companies served on the Peruvian side at the Battle of Callao and later played an important role during the War of the Pacific.

Company "Roma" No. 2 was established by Italian residents of Lima in Barrios Altos at the Convent of Santo Tomás de la Santísima Trinidad on April 15, under the direction of Emilio Longhi, described as the "dean" of the firefighting companies of the city and occupying its current building in October 1891. Giovanni Battista (Juan Bautista) Berninzoni was the first member of the company to be killed in action, dying due to a nighttime fire at La Merced, a convent at Filipinas Street, on December 10, 1870. The fire had been caused by a candle lit by friar Pedro Solís, and caused the collapse of the convent's façade, an event that mortally wounded Berninzoni.

Company "France" No. 3 was established by French residents of Lima six days later under the same circumstances, and headed by Theodore Wattecamps. Its second headquarters at the Plazuela del Teatro served as a hospital for Nicolás de Piérola's "National Coalition" during the Peruvian Civil War of 1894–1895. It moved to its current headquarters at Mogollón Street in 1935.

Company "Lima" No. 4 was established as the "Bomba Municipal de Lima" under the same circumstances, and composed of Peruvians in its entirety. Its first member to die was Antonio Alarco Espinosa, who was killed in action during the 1866 battle of Callao while serving at La Merced, a battery tower in La Punta. This company, sponsored by the Municipal Government, ceased to exist following the battle, after which the same founding members established another company under the same name.

== History ==
During the mid-20th century, efforts were made to unite the firefighting companies of the country into a central organisation, which took place under the government of Manuel A. Odría in 1953.

=== Creation ===
The General Corps of Volunteer Firefighters of Peru (CGBVP) was formally created following an assembly in Huacho on December 2, 1953, with Orestes del Sante Molfino serving as its first Commander-General. A periodical, the El Bombero, began publication in May 1957, serving as the institution's official magazine until July 1970, when it reached its 30th issue and ceased publication.

On July 26, 1957, office number 34 of Málaga Santolalla Building's 12th floor—located at Tacna 543—was blessed by chaplain Alvaro Díaz (of the corps in Callao) and inaugurated as the new headquarters of the National Command of the CGBVP. The ceremony's sponsors were engineer Fermín Málaga Santolalla and his wife, Mercedes Bravo, both owners of the building. At the time of the lease, Jorge E. Thornberry was interim commander, temporarily replacing José Miguel Corzo. This location was succeeded by another one located at Quilca 210, at the corner with Ocoña Street.

Law No. 27067, published on March 10, 1999, organised the corps into its current structure. The last volunteer fire department to be created prior to the 21st century was Company "Ayaviri" No. 170, created in the town of the same name in Puno on December 31, 2000. By then, the CGBVP had already moved to its current headquarters in San Isidro, with an administrative office located at a traditional building at 28 de Julio 520. By then, the location at Tacna 543 functioned as the Regional Command and the Radio-Alarm Central Office, both for the Department of Lima.

=== Recent history ===
On 18 November 2022, an Airbus A320neo operated by LATAM Airlines Perú, the country's flag carrier, collided with a fire engine during takeoff, killing two firefighters and seriously injuring a third, with injuries also taking place in the aircraft.

The emergency telephone number 116, assigned to the CGBVP, was briefly disabled in April 2026. Earlier that same year, its general commander had warned of a budget deficit exceeding S/. 4 billion (US$1.2 billion).

== Organisation ==
The CGBVP is organised into the following structure, as per the 1999 law:

- National Command (Comando Nacional)
- Council of General Officers (Consejo de Oficiales Generales)
- Inspectorate-General (Inspectoría General)
- National Discipline Council (Consejo Nacional de Disciplina)
- Departmental Commands (Comandancias Departamentales)
- Firefighting Companies (Compañías de Bomberos)

=== Leadership ===
The CGBVP is headed by a Commander-General.

Commander-General	Term	
Commander-General	Start	End
Orestes del Sante Molfino	January 10, 1954	December 17, 1954
José Miguel Corzo Moreno	December 17, 1954	March 1961
Attilio Airaldi Panettiere	1961	June 6, 1961 (Note: Died in office; was to serve until 1962.)
Virgilio Airaldi Panettiere	February 1970	February 1972
Alfonso del Castillo Icaza	1964	1975 (Note: Del Castillo temporarily did not serve from 1970 to 1971.)
Humberto Arias Fiscalini	1975	1976
Waldo Olivos Villarreal	1977	December 31, 1979
Ricardo Montalva Simonetti	1982	1983
Tulio Nicolini Ayarza	1992	1995
Víctor Potestá Bastante	1996	2000
Tulio Nicolini Ayarza	2001	2002
Gonzalo Lostaunau Silva	2013	2014
Victor Mondragón Tarrillo		2016
Andrés Roberto Ángeles Bachet	December 3, 2017	September 12, 2019
Larry Steve Lynch Solís	September 2019	December 30, 2020
Luis Antonio Ponce La Jara	December 30, 2020	2023
Juan Carlos Morales Carpio	January 1, 2024	Incumbent

=== Ranks ===
Officers of the CGBVP operate under a nine-rank system. A law establishing a reform was published in 2009, but left without effect in 2010.

Category	General Officers			Superior Officers		Officers			Sub-Officers
Ensign	sinmarco	sinmarco	sinmarco	sinmarco	sinmarco	sinmarco	sinmarco	sinmarco	sinmarco
Rank	Comandante general	General de brigada	Brigadier mayor	Brigadier	Teniente brigadier	Capitán	Teniente	Subteniente	Seccionario

== Notable incidents ==
- Limazo (1975) — A Republican and Civil Guard strike turned citywide unrest that heavily affected downtown Lima.
- Mesa Redonda fire (2001) — A negligent ignition of pyrotechnics at an informal marketplace turned local disaster, killing 277 people and injuring 247.
- Utopía nightclub fire (2002) — Ignition of acoustic foam during a torch juggling show that destroyed a nightclub located at the Jockey Plaza, a shopping centre.
- Las Malvinas fire (2017) — Ignition of a pail of paint thinner at a hardware store that destroyed a shopping centre located at a larger adjacent building.
- LATAM Airlines Perú Flight 2213 (2022) — An Airbus A320neo operated by LATAM Airlines Perú collided with a fire engine during takeoff, killing two firefighters.

== See also ==
- National Police of Peru

== Bibliography ==
- Coz Vargas, Julio César (Brigadier CBP) (2009). Historia del Cuerpo de Bomberos Voluntarios del Perú al cierre del milenio. 1860 - 2000 (PDF) (in Spanish) (1st ed.). Lima: SEGRAF S.A. Archived from the original (PDF) on 2025-02-18.
