= Jockey Plaza =

Shopping mall in Lima, Peru

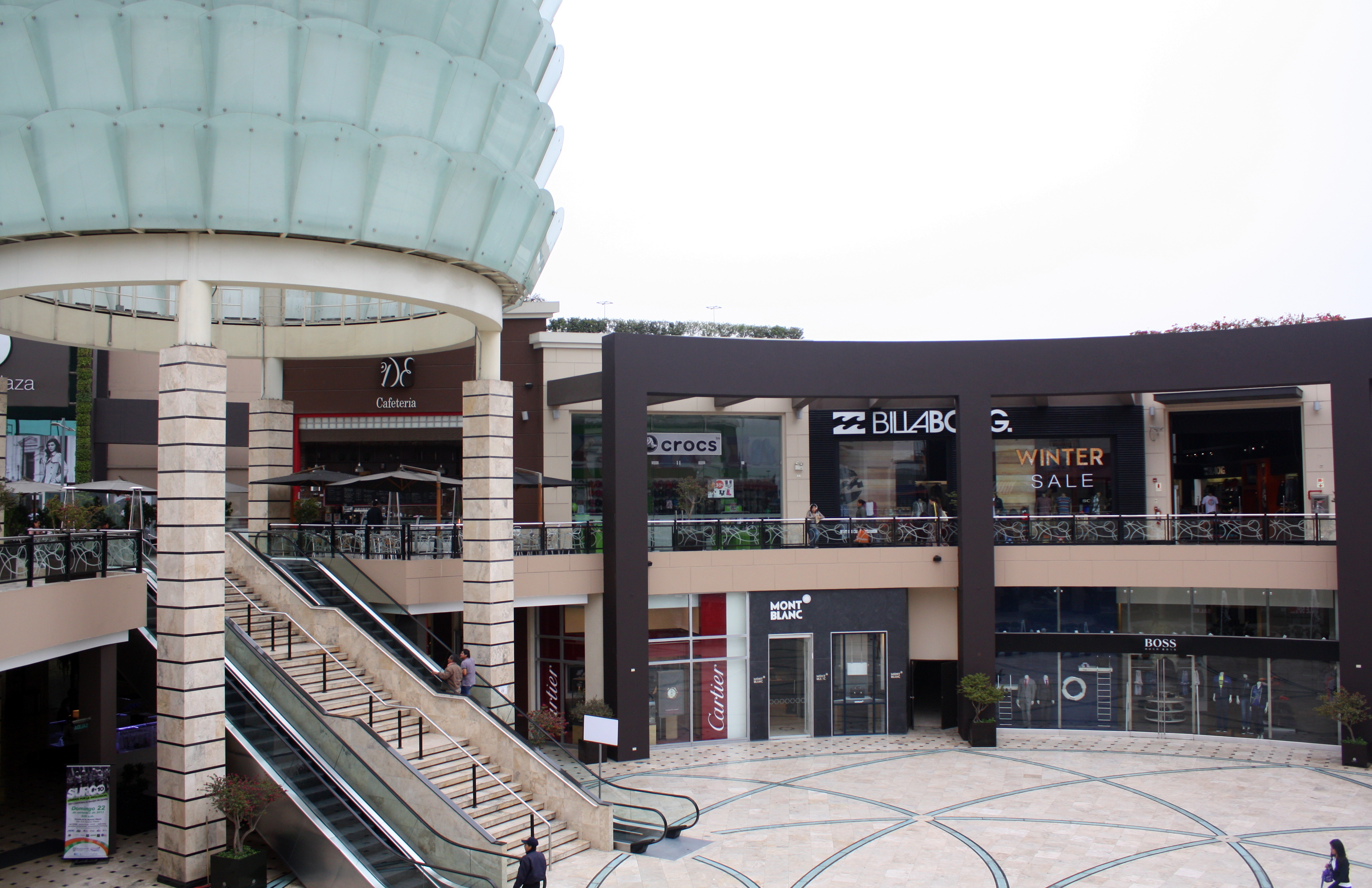
- View of the boulevard
- Location: Lima, Peru
- Address: 4200 Javier Prado Este, Santiago de Surco, Lima, Peru
- Opened: April 17, 1997
- Developer: Asociación de Centros Comerciales y de Entretenimiento del Perú (ACCEP)
- Manager: Juan José Calle
- Owner: Administradora Jockey Plaza Shopping Center S.A.
- Num. of stores: 433
- Floors: 3
- Website: jockey-plaza.com.pe

Jockey Plaza Shopping Center, also known simply as Jockey Plaza, is a shopping centre located in Fundo Monterrico Chico, a neighbourhood of Santiago de Surco, Lima, Peru. It is located next to the Hippodrome of Monterrico and the University of Lima, facing Javier Prado Avenue.

It is one of the country's largest shopping centres, with over 500 stores, including: Plaza Vea, Tottus, Sodimac, Ripley, Falabella, Cinemark, and Divercity. A big hall (Spanish: nave central) with two levels exists between the main stores, which contains minor stores such as Movistar, Tommy Hilfiger, La Curacao, and Bath & Body Works. There are also games and a food court.

== History ==
With an investment of over US$ 45 million, the mall started operating on April 17, 1997, with four anchor stores: Ace Home Center (later Maestro between 2008 and 2010 and currently Sodimac as of 2025), Santa Isabel (Plaza Vea since 2001), Saga Falabella (Falabella since 2018) and Ripley.

In 2002, a fire at a nightclub on its first floor killed 29 people and injured 54 others. The nightclub, located at space 1E-A, had been operating without a licence.

In 2004, a Krispy Kreme store was inaugurated, beginning the brand's operations in the country, which ceased in 2012.

A Blockbuster store operated until 2006, being replaced by Boticas Fasa (later Mifarma). A medical building, Jockey Salud, was inaugurated in November 2007.

A boulevard with a number of stores opened in November 2010.

In 2012, a Hard Rock Cafe opened at its first floor, marking the brand's return to the country since 2001, when it closed its restaurant in Larcomar. It eventually closed in 2019.

In 2014, the country's second Forever 21 store opened in the mall until 2024, closing in part due to the COVID-19 pandemic in Peru.

== See also ==
- Hipódromo de Monterrico
