= Falabella (disambiguation) =

Falabella is a miniature horse breed.

It may also refer to:

== Business ==
- Falabella (retail store), a South American department store chain.
- Falabella (company) a Chilean company that operates various businesses in South America

== People ==
- Débora Falabella (born 1979), Brazilian actress
- Miguel Falabella (born 1956), Brazilian actor
