= Mallplaza =

Chilean mall chain

Mallplaza S.A.
- Company type: Public
- Traded as: BCS: MALLPLAZA
- Industry: Shopping Malls
- Founded: 1990; 36 years ago
- Headquarters: Santiago, Chile
- Products: Management of Shopping Malls
- Brands: Aires, Autoplaza y Las Terrazas
- Website: mallplaza.com

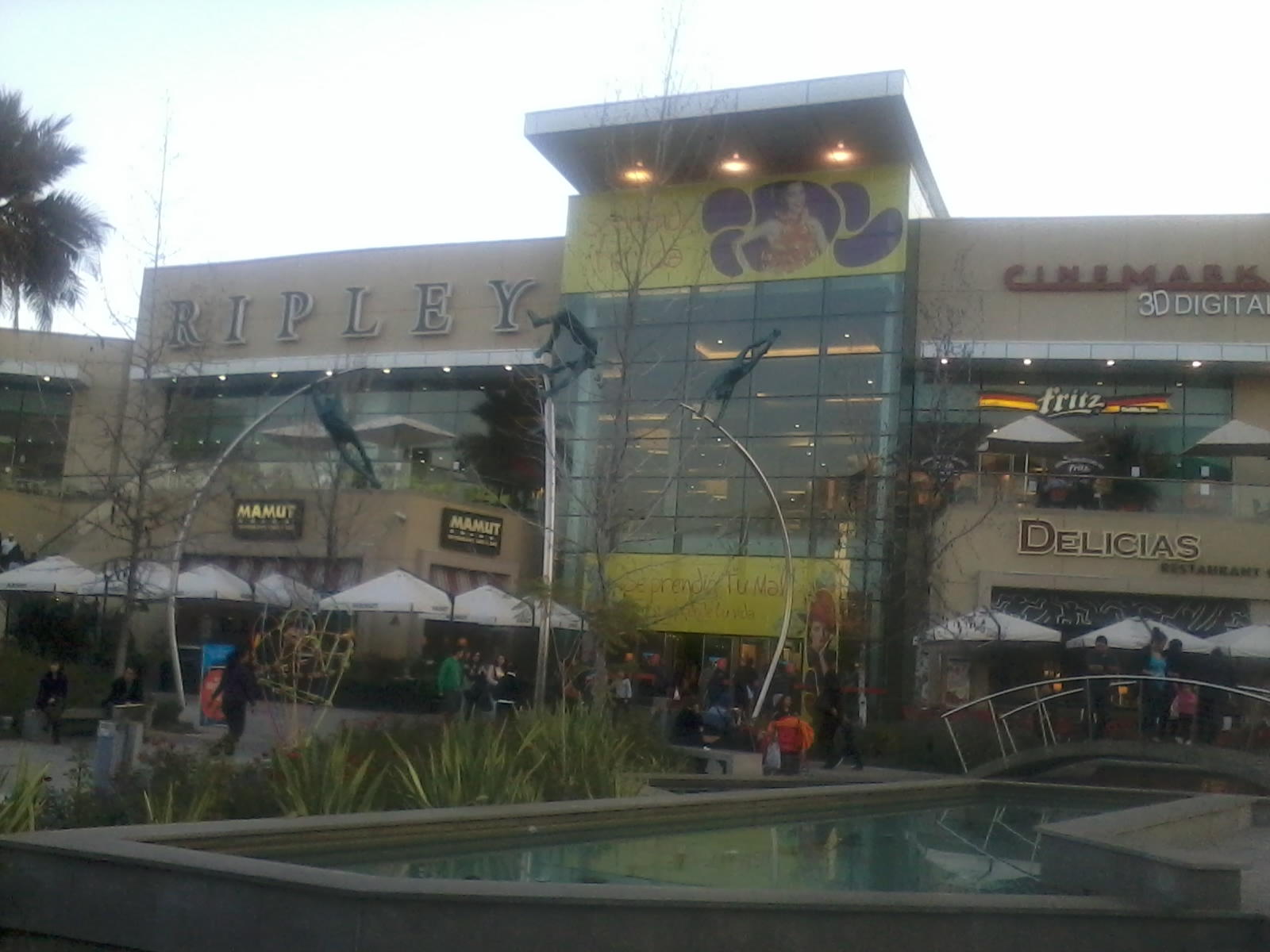
The exterior of Mall Plaza Tobalaba

Mallplaza S.A. is a Chilean chain of malls operated in South America by Falabella.

== History ==
There are 11 locations in Chile, 4 in Peru (under the Mall Aventura Plaza brand until 2016), and 3 in Colombia. They are large regional shopping malls anchored by multiple department stores and hypermarkets. This includes the parent company's Falabella department stores and Tottus hypermarkets . The company's mottos are "Hay vida en tu plaza" - "There's life in your plaza", "Más vida a tu vida" - "More life to your life", and "Dale vida a tu plaza" - "Give life to your plaza. Falabella plans on opening 40 new locations within 2011 including expansion in Peru and into Colombia and Argentina. In September 2017, Falabella launched its 45th store in the Mallplaza.

Mallplaza has five locations in Colombia.

- Mallplaza NQS: (previously Centro Comercial Calima) in Bogotá
- Mallplaza Cali: in Cali
- Mallplaza Villavicencio: in Villavicencio
- Mallplaza Cartagena: in Cartagena
- Mallplaza Los Rios: in Barranquilla
