= Jirón Gamarra =

Street in Lima, Peru

Coordinates: 12.0647°S 77.0135°W

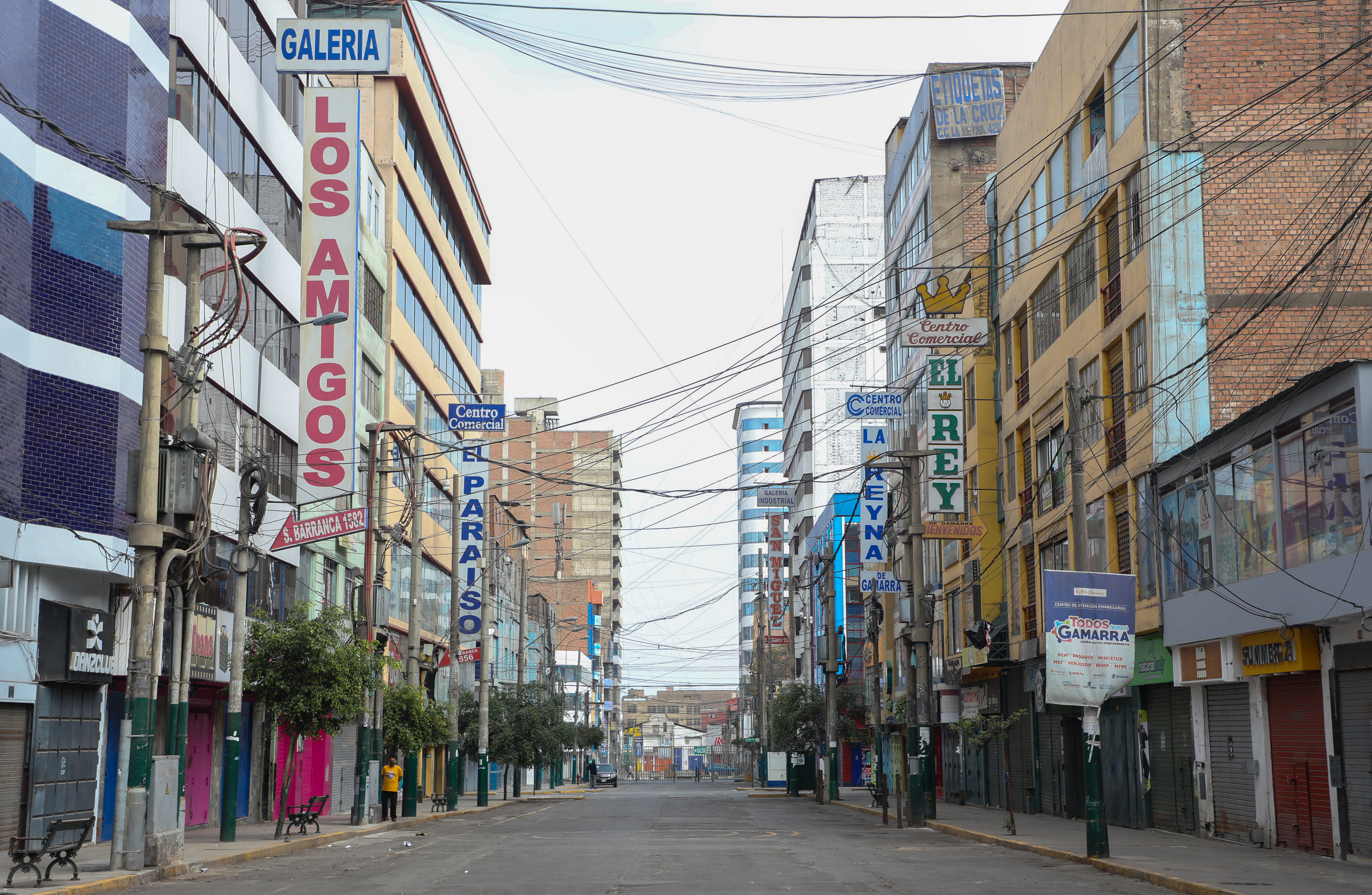
- The street in 2020
- Interactive map of Jirón Gamarra
- Part of: Barrios Altos
- Namesake: Agustín Gamarra
- From: Grau Avenue
- To: Mexico Avenue

Other
- Website: www.gamarra.com.pe

Jirón Agustín Gamarra is one of the main streets of the district of La Victoria, also forming part of the neighbourhood of Barrios Altos, itself part of the historic centre of Lima, Peru. Over forty blocks long, it is best known for the Gamarra Commercial Emporium, which houses fashion stores and textile manufacturing workshops.

== History ==
For some 120 years, Gamarra was a residential street in what was then known as Villa Victoria that ran parallel to Aviación Avenue until the 1950s. Commerce in the avenue started in the late 19th century and early 20th century, starting when the Italian Bartolomé Boggio and American Enrique Price founded the Santa Catalina textile factory in 1889, hiring 300 people, among them 160 women, at a time where the Walls of Lima still stood before being replaced by Miguel Grau Avenue. By the 1950s, Arab and Jewish families had also established themselves in the area, with some Chinese also moving in later.

The shopping centre grew with two different migration waves that reached Lima in the 20th century: in 1948 and in 1970, with the latter immigrants moving into nearby San Cosme hill, which allowed them to reach the area easily. In the 1980s and 1990s, the area became extremely disorganised due to being swearmed with street vendors, influenced by the crisis at the time, only being removed in 1999. The measure, initially successful, was ultimately temporary.

The area has also seen its share of crime and terrorism, the latter during the internal conflict in Peru and the former in the form of extortionists.

On December 3, 2010, a man entered a BBVA bank and took thirty-three people inside hostage for seven hours, two of which were injured. The man was later identified as Ruiz Wilfredo Ninasqui Barrios, who demanded money and two escape vehicles: a motorcycle and a helicopter. The latter's noise was used to obfuscate that of a chainsaw used by law enforcement to make an entrance in the establishment's backroom. Ninasqui was fatally shot in the head by one of the five snipers who used this entrance, succumbing to his injuries two hours later at Dos de Mayo National Hospital.

== Shopping centre ==
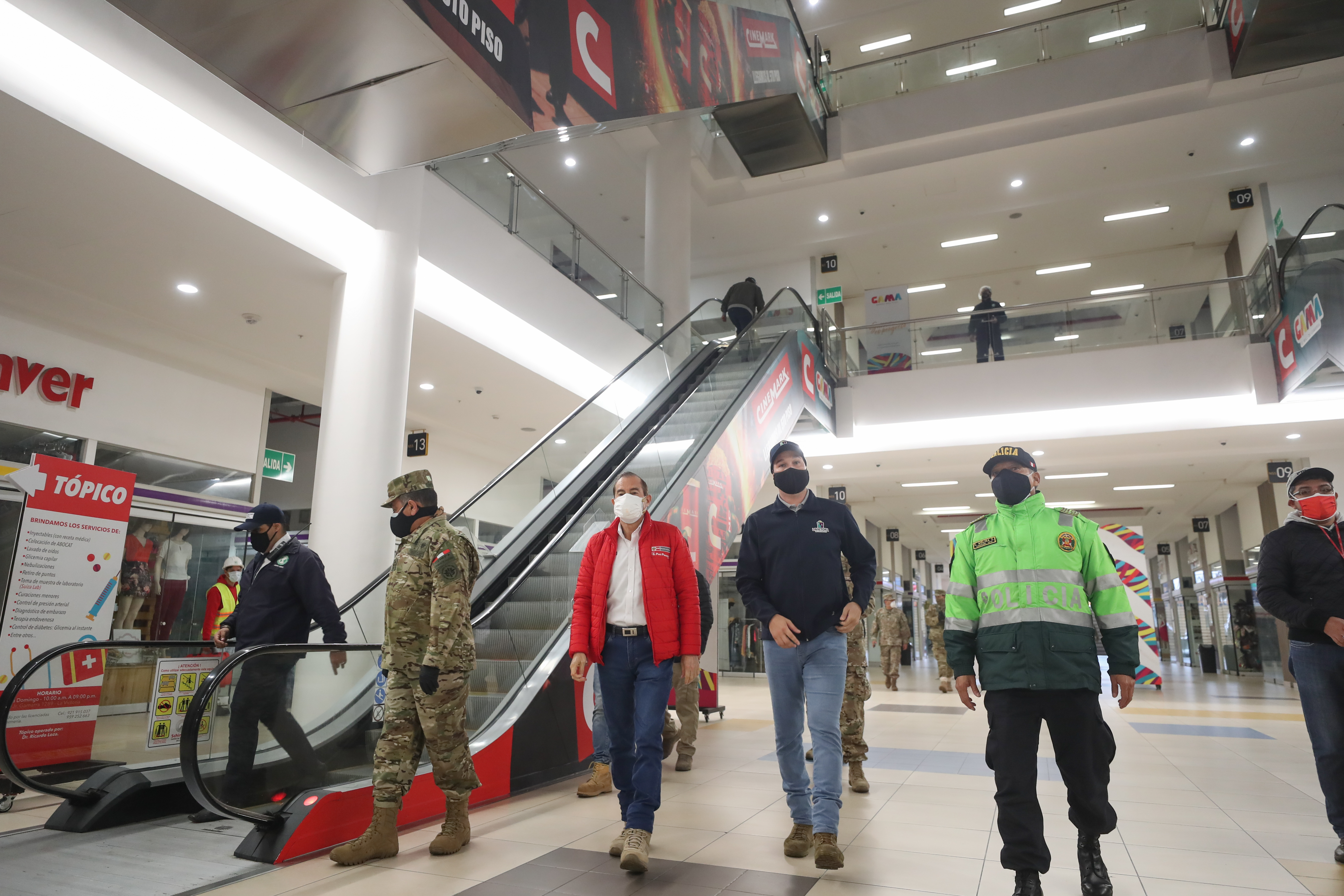
Mayor George Forsyth and Defence Minister Walter Martos in GAMA.

The street is best known for the Gamarra Commercial Emporium (Spanish: Emporio Comercial de Gamarra), the largest of its kind in the country. Despite its informality, the emporium is considered an important driving force of the economy of Peru, as its employs over 71,000 people, mostly in the textile industry. The square metre in the Gamarra area has a value of at least US$8,000, reaching prices of US$20,000 in some places.

In 2018, Gamarra Moda Plaza (GAMA), a formal shopping mall, was opened in the area. The project had been announced four years prior, with retail chains Saga Falabella and Ripley S.A. joining the project the same year. In October 2015, Peruvian newspaper Gestión announced that the project had a cost of S/. 435 million.

== See also ==
- Mesa Redonda, Lima
- Mercado Central de Lima
