= Los Olivos stampede =

2020 crowd crush in Lima, Peru

Los Olivos crowd crush
- Date: 22 August 2020
- Time: 9:00 p.m. PET (UTC–5)
- Venue: Thomas Restobar nightclub
- Location: Los Olivos District, Lima, Peru; 11°57′56.4″S 77°03′53.1″W
- Type: Fatal crowd crush
- Cause: Police raid
- Deaths: 13
- Injuries: 6
- Arrests: 23

A crowd crush occurred in the Los Olivos District of Lima, Peru on 22 August 2020, killing at least thirteen and injuring six others. The crush was a result of a raid by the National Police of Peru on the Thomas Restobar nightclub to break up an illegal gathering amid the COVID-19 pandemic in Peru.

== Background ==
Peru is one of the countries most affected by the COVID-19 pandemic, with over 576,000 confirmed cases of coronavirus disease 2019 documented by 23 August 2020, and over 27,000 deaths attributed to the virus up to that date. In response to the pandemic, the Peruvian government banned large gatherings and enforced a 10:00 p.m. PET (UTC–5) curfew. Nightclubs had been closed since March 2020 in order to prevent the spread of the coronavirus.

== Crush ==
Local authorities were dispatched to the Thomas Restobar nightclub after receiving complaints from residents that about twenty to thirty people were in the club in violation of the government's ban on gatherings. The crowd had instead amounted to over 120 people, with the authorities realizing this shortly after their raid began at about 9:00 p.m. PET. Peruvian authorities reported that police had attempted to calmly disperse the gathering and panicked guests surged down the stairs from the second level when attempting to flee the scene. Police had to forcibly pull the doors of the club open with ropes attached to trucks due to the number of people crowding the exit.

Authorities attempted to provide first aid and transported the injured to nearby hospitals, with twelve individuals dying in transit and another dying while hospitalized. At least thirteen people were killed and six were injured during the event. Twenty-three people were detained by police as a result of the incident, with fifteen of those arrested testing positive for coronavirus.

== Reactions ==
President Martín Vizcarra responded to the incident saying:

I have different feelings and emotions as a person, as an authority, with these circumstances. Obviously I feel sorry and I have sadness for the people and relatives of the people who have lost their lives, but I also have anger and indignation for those responsible for organizing these types of events. [...] Please don't be irresponsible; don't expose people's lives. Those 13 lives could have been saved if we did not have this type of behavior [involving the] negligence of businessmen, who know that these types of events are prohibited.

President Vizcarra also encouraged judicial authorities to punish those who had broken the law.

The Peruvian Ministry of the Interior released a statement following the event, stating "The Ministry of the Interior profoundly regrets the deaths of 13 people as a consequence of the criminal irresponsibility of an unscrupulous business owner". Rosario Sasieta, Minister of Women and Vulnerable Populations, stated "I ask for the maximum sanction for those responsible. We are talking about intentional homicide for profit ... Partners and owners are the main responsible". A criminal attorney stated that the owners of the nightclub faced up to 35 years in prison if they are charged with homicide as a result of the incident. An attorney for the owners of the property said that they "are not responsible" for the incident and that they had leased the building to be operated as a restaurant, not as a nightclub.

Relatives of victims and those gathered at the club told Peruvian outlets that tear gas was deployed at the venue, though Peruvian authorities denied that any crowd control agents were dispersed.

== See also ==
- Crowd collapses and crushes § Crowd "stampedes"
- Estadio Nacional disaster
- Victoria Hall disaster
- List of fatal crowd crushes
- Utopía nightclub fire
