= Mesa Redonda fire =

2001 disaster in Lima, Peru

- Date: December 29, 2001
- Time: 7:30 PM
- Location: Mesa Redonda, Lima
- Cause: Pyrotechnics flare, negligence
- Deaths: 291
- Injuries: 134

The Mesa Redonda fire occurred on Saturday, December 29, 2001 in Lima, Peru. The disaster killed at least 291 people and injured at least another 134. It is one of the worst firework-related fires in history in terms of deaths.

== Origin ==
In 2001, the Mesa Redonda shopping center, located in Central Lima, consisted largely of wood and adobe houses lining narrow streets. In December, fireworks merchants were known to sell their goods for holiday celebrations. Wary of the danger, the municipal government of Lima declared the area an "emergency zone."

The fire began at about 7:30 p.m. on the night of 29 December when a fireworks display created a chain reaction, setting off the fireworks of other nearby vendors. A spark from the demonstration had landed on a stockpile of fireworks, creating the initial explosion. The aftermath created a "wall of fire" that spread for four blocks and raged for several hours.

== See also ==
- List of fireworks accidents and incidents
- Utopía nightclub fire
- Las Malvinas fire
