= Mercado Central de Lima =

Central market of Lima, Peru

Central Market of Lima
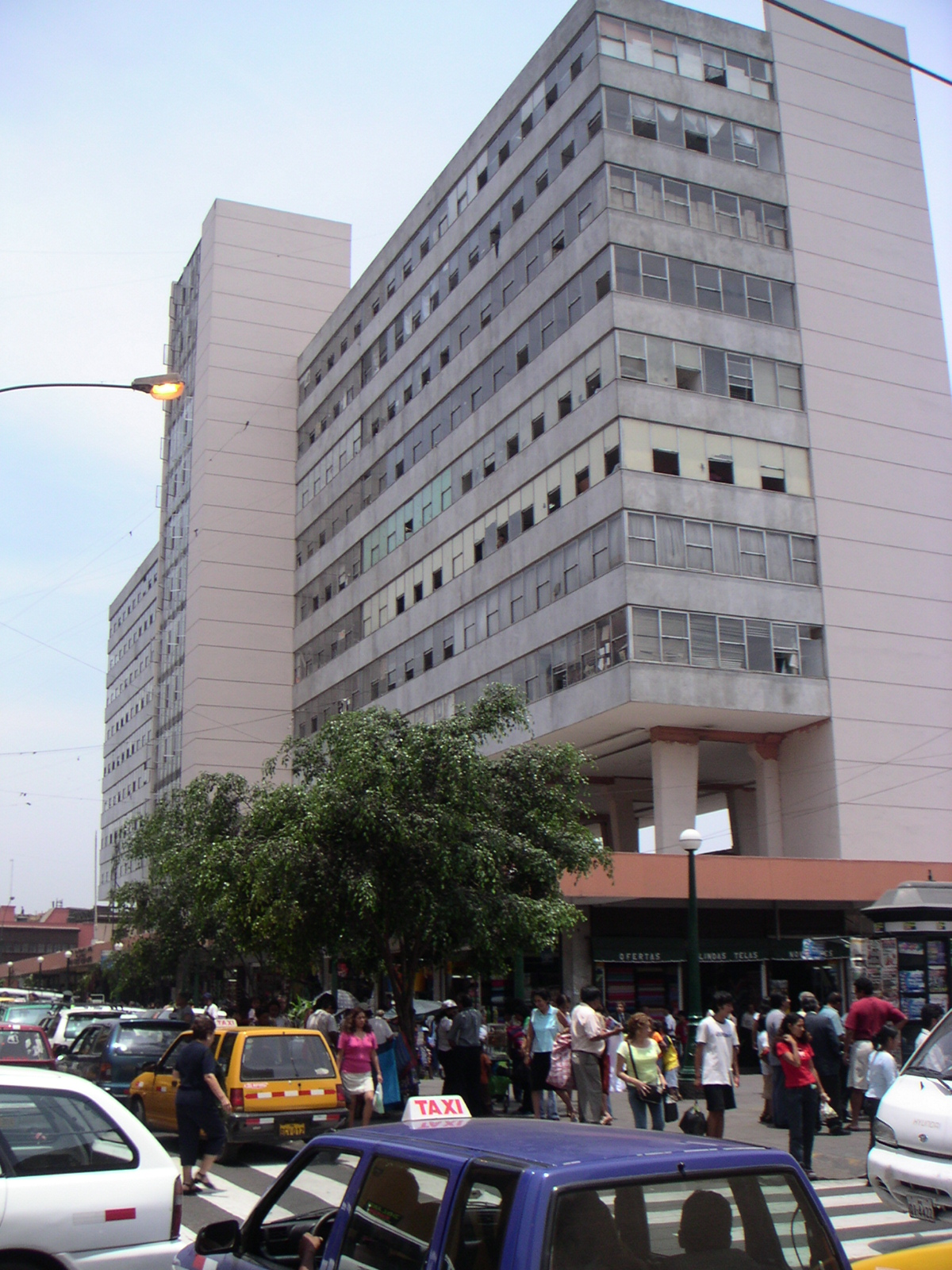

General information
- Year(s) built: 1964–1967
- Inaugurated: July 8, 1967
- Cost: S/. 90 million

Design and construction
- Architect(s): Alfredo Dammert y Garrido Lecca

The Central Market of Lima (Spanish: Mercado Central de Lima) is the central market of the city of Lima, Peru. Located in the neighbourhood of Barrios Altos, next to Chinatown, it is part of the historic centre of the city.

The building is made up of a basement that occupies the entire block, with a commercial perimeter ring. The basement is divided into two sectors differentiated by half a level and connected by ramps. A building rests on it. It has two truck entrance ramps to the basement.

== History ==
In 1846, during the government of President Ramón Castilla, a supreme decree was issued for the construction of a food market in the city of Lima. It was decided that its location would be the same as it currently occupies: the block surrounded by Huallaga, Andahuaylas, Ucayali and Ayacucho streets. The land was expropriated from the nuns of the nearby Convent of La Concepción. In 1852 the construction of what was called the Market of la Concepción (Spanish: Mercado de la Concepción) began, which remained standing until 1905 when it was rebuilt during the administration of the then mayor Federico Elguera. This building was destroyed by a fire on February 28, 1964, after a kitchen explosion.

After the tragedy, which generated the total destruction of the market, the government of Fernando Belaúnde Terry authorized a loan to the Municipality of Lima for the immediate construction of a new market. Architect Alfredo Dammert y Garrico Lecca were hired to lead the project. This decision was the opportunity for the construction in Lima of a market system that would serve the already enormous city of Lima. The reconstruction of the central market was accompanied by the construction of a wholesale and producers' market on the outskirts of the city (limit of the current districts of La Victoria and El Agustino) as well as 26 peripheral retail markets.

The new building was inaugurated on July 8, 1967, at a cost of S/. 90 million at the time and with an area of 12 thousand m^{2} and the capacity to house 950 sales positions. Additionally, it had 14 cold storage rooms, an unloading basement for 50 trucks and ramps for loading and unloading merchandise. During the 1980s, due to the conditions of political and economic crisis in the country, the market and its surrounding area were immersed in problems of disorder, overcrowding and insecurity. A situation that was corrected towards the end of the 1990s during the mayoralty of Alberto Andrade.

== See also ==
- Chinatown, Lima
- Mesa Redonda, Lima
- Jirón Gamarra
