= Mesa Redonda, Lima =

Shopping centre in Peru

Mesa Redonda
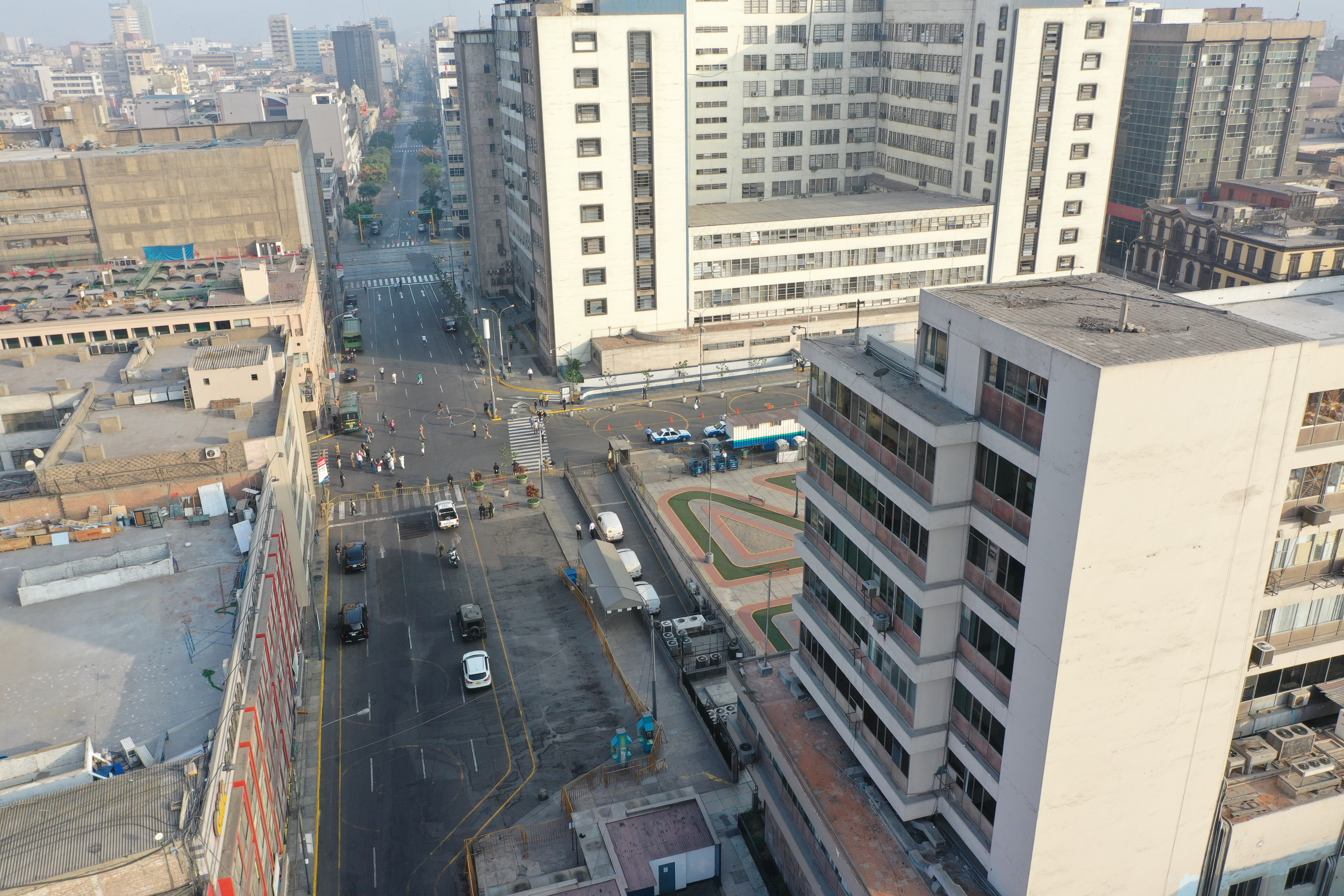
- Aerial view in 2020
- Location: Barrios Altos
- Opened: 1980s
- Num. of stores: 40,000+

Mesa Redonda is a shopping centre in the neighbourhood of Barrios Altos, part of the historic centre of Lima, Peru. The area is surrounded by Huanta and Cuzco streets, as well as Abancay and Nicolás de Piérola avenues. Known for its informality, its the site of a number of fires, notably that of 2001.

== History ==
The area is mainly related to the wholesale pyrotechnics industry and festive events, including the businesses near the street of the same name and its surroundings Cuzco, Andahuaylas and Puno, in part of the pre-Hispanic canal of Huatica, considered Cultural Heritage of the Nation. It occupies an area of around 90 thousand m^{2} and is home to around nine thousand merchants, fifteen thousand in 2012, who are found in hundreds of stores among the 163 galleries or small shopping centres.

Initially, as reported by El Comercio in the 1950s, Mesa Redonda was an area for street food sales. The place was modernised in the 1980s with the urban expansion of Lima, and during the mandate of Mayor Alberto Andrade it housed several merchants. Since 1994 the original gallery has been owned by Ricardo Wong and operated jointly by the Chamber of Entrepreneurs and Merchants of Mesa Redonda.

Next to the central market, it is one of the well-known commercial areas in the centre of Lima that concentrates the popular market. Around 200,000 visit the gallery every day, with records of 700,000 buyers on the night before Christmas Eve in 2015, and around a million on the last day of 2017. A Global Research Marketing survey in 2014 indicates that one in every four respondents would buy school supplies in this area. In 2019 the estimated daily revenue was US$20 million.

=== Incidents ===
The place is infamous for being a repeat offender of fires in the city, a product of the invasion of informal commerce, including the formation of clandestine warehouses and their expansion in the narrow street that hinders their evacuation. Between 1991 and 2010, eight fires of considerable magnitude were recorded, including the one that occurred in 2001 with more than 270 deaths in total. Meanwhile, between 2014 and 2016, the majority of city fire reports were made in this area. In 2021, a small fire was recorded again.

In 2003 it had 11 hydrants in case of a possible fire threat within its so-called "critical zone."

In 2023, the commercial area was declared a rigid zone by the Municipality of Lima to prevent street sales and parking. In that year, measures were taken to mitigate quota collection mafias while Christmas shopping was carried out.

== See also ==
- Mercado Central de Lima
- Jirón Gamarra
