= S.A.C.I. Falabella =

Chilean retail company

Falabella S.A.
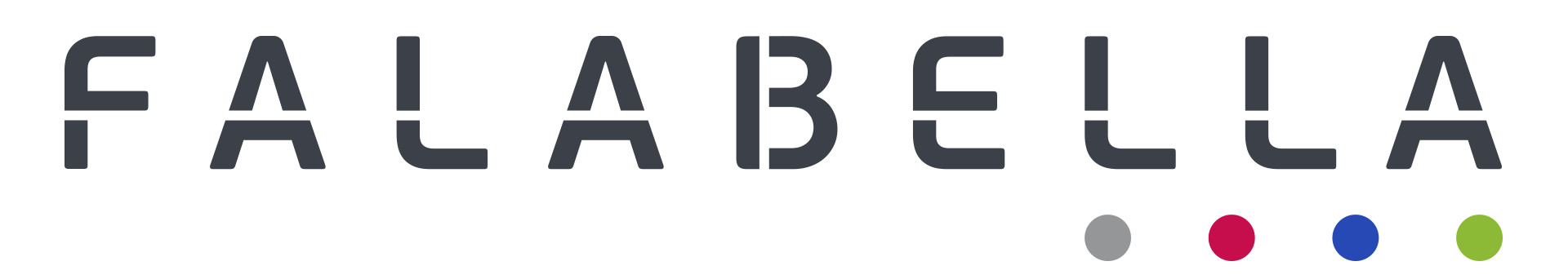
- Type: Public
- Traded as: BCS: FALABELLA; S&P Latin America 40 component
- Industry: Retail
- Founded: 1889; 137 years ago
- Headquarters: Santiago, Chile
- Key people: Carlo Solari Donaggio (chairman); Alejandro González Dale (CEO)
- Products: Malls; Supermarkets; Banking; Clothing
- Revenue: ▲US$14.6 billion (2017)
- Net income: ▲US$828.9 million (2017)
- Number of employees: 113,378 (2017)
- Website: www.falabella.com/inversionistas

Falabella S.A. is a Chilean multinational company. It is the second largest retail company in Chile after Cencosud and one of the largest in Latin America. It operates its flagship Falabella department stores in addition to Mall Plaza shopping centers, Tottus hyper & supermarkets, Banco Falabella banks, and Sodimac home improvement centers. The company has 491 stores and 42 shopping malls. The stores are divided into 111 department stores branded as Falabella, 251 home improvement stores under the brand Sodimac and 129 supermarkets branded as Tottus. In Peru the company owned the Saga Falabella, listed in the Lima Stock Exchange. It was renamed to Falabella in 2018.

Falabella Department Stores division has been a member of the International Association of Department Stores since 2009.

== Description ==
The company is a leading Chilean retailer of apparel, accessories and household products distribution through department stores, specialty stores and malls; the company distributes food through hyper and supermarkets. In addition, the company manufactures textile fabrics and offers financial services (issuance of credit cards, insurance brokerage, bank and travel agency) through CMR (credit cards) and through Banco Falabella. The company primarily operates in markets outside of Chile such as Argentina, Peru and Colombia. It is headquartered in Santiago.

== History ==
- 1889: Salvatore Falabella opened his first great tailoring store on Ahumada Street, Santiago, Chile.
- 1937: Alberto Solari joined the company, transforming it into an important clothing store.
- 1958: Household products were introduced, laying the foundations for the first department store in Chile, and Ahumada Street became known as "Falabella Street".
- 1962: The first store outside Santiago was opened in Concepción.
- 1980: Falabella launched CMR, its own credit card and the first of its kind in Chile.
- 1990: Mallplaza opened its first shopping mall in Chile, Mallplaza Vespucio, in La Florida.
- 1993: Falabella entered Argentina and Sodimac entered Colombia.
- 1995: Falabella entered Peru by acquiring Saga.
- 1996: S.A.C.I. Falabella goes public and its shares begin to trade on the Santiago Stock Exchange.
- 1997: Viajes Falabella and Seguros Falabella created.
- 1997: S.A.C.I. Falabella formed a partnership with The Home Depot in Chile, and acquired it four years later.
- 1998: Banco Falabella was formed, by acquiring a license from ING Bank Chile.
- 1999: Falabella.com launched internet sales in Chile.
- 2002: S.A.C.I. Falabella opened the first Tottus supermarket in Lima, Peru.
- 2003: S.A.C.I. Falabella and Sodimac merged, launching the first regional home improvement chain in Latin America.
- 2004: S.A.C.I. Falabella acquired the San Francisco supermarket chain in Chile.
- 2006: Falabella Retail entered Colombia with its first department store in Bogotá.
- 2007: Banco Falabella was launched in Peru.
- 2007: Aventura Plaza was launched in Peru.
- 2007: Sodimac acquired 60% of the Imperial home improvement chain in Chile.
- 2008-09: CMR formed a partnership with Visa in Peru and Chile. Then formed a partnership with MasterCard in Argentina and Colombia in 2011.
- 2009: Homy was launched in Chile.
- 2011: Banco Falabella was launched in Colombia.
- 2012: Mallplaza opened its first shopping mall in Colombia.
- 2013: S.A.C.I. Falabella entered Brazil by acquiring 50.1% of the Dicico home improvement chain.
- 2013: Móvil Falabella was launched in Chile.
- 2014: Sodimac acquired the Maestro home improvement chain in Peru.
- 2014: Hiperbodega Precio Uno was launched in Peru
- 2015: Sodimac entered Uruguay by opening its first two stores.
- 2015: S.A.C.I. Falabella opened its first two Sodimac stores in Brazil.
- 2016: S.A.C.I. Falabella was admitted into the Dow Jones Sustainability World Index.
- 2016: Separation of Aventura Plaza S.A. in Peru. S.A.C.I.
- 2016: S.A.C.I. Falabella and Soriana signed final contracts to jointly develop Home Improvement (Sodimac) and Financial Services (CMR) businesses in Mexico.
- 2017: The first Falabella-Soriana credit card was issued in Mexico, and the company acquired 50% of Servicios Financieros Soriana S.A.P.I de C.V.
- 2018: in Peru the name "Saga Falabella" was deleted and the denomination changes simply to "Falabella" just like in the other countries.
- 2021: Falabella left Argentina.
