= Sodimac =

Chilean home improvement warehouse store chain

Sodimac S.A.
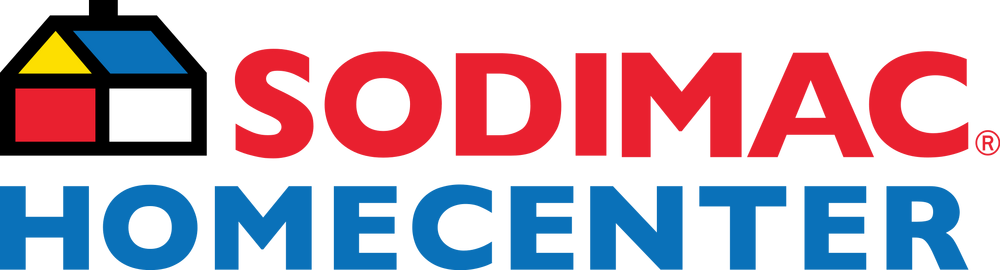
- Type: Sociedad Anónima
- Industry: Commerce
- Founded: 1952; 74 years ago
- Headquarters: Santiago, Chile
- Area served: Chile, Argentina, Brazil, Mexico, Colombia, Peru, Uruguay, China, Malaysia, Philippines and Taiwan
- Key people: Alejandro Arze (Mar 2020–)
- Products: Household items and building materials
- Subsidiaries: Imperial.cl, Imperial S.A.
- Website: sodimac.com

Sodimac Homecenter is a Chilean chain of home improvement stores. Besides Chile, there also are stores in Argentina, Colombia, Peru, Mexico, Uruguay, China, Malaysia, Philippines, Taiwan and Brazil.

== History ==
It is owned and operated by Falabella. There are 40 locations in Argentina, Brazil, Chile, Peru, Colombia, China, Uruguay, Malaysia (by an Indonesian master group), Philippines, Taiwan and Mexico.

The company plans doubling its presence in America by 2010. In March 2015, Sodimac opened the doors to the public of its first store in Uruguay; in June of the same year its first store opened in São Paulo, Brazil and in April 2016, it announced the arrival in Mexico together with the local supermarket chain Soriana.

In 2018, the company announced that it would invest $220 million into technology and expansion.
