= Utopía nightclub fire =

2002 fire in Lima, Peru

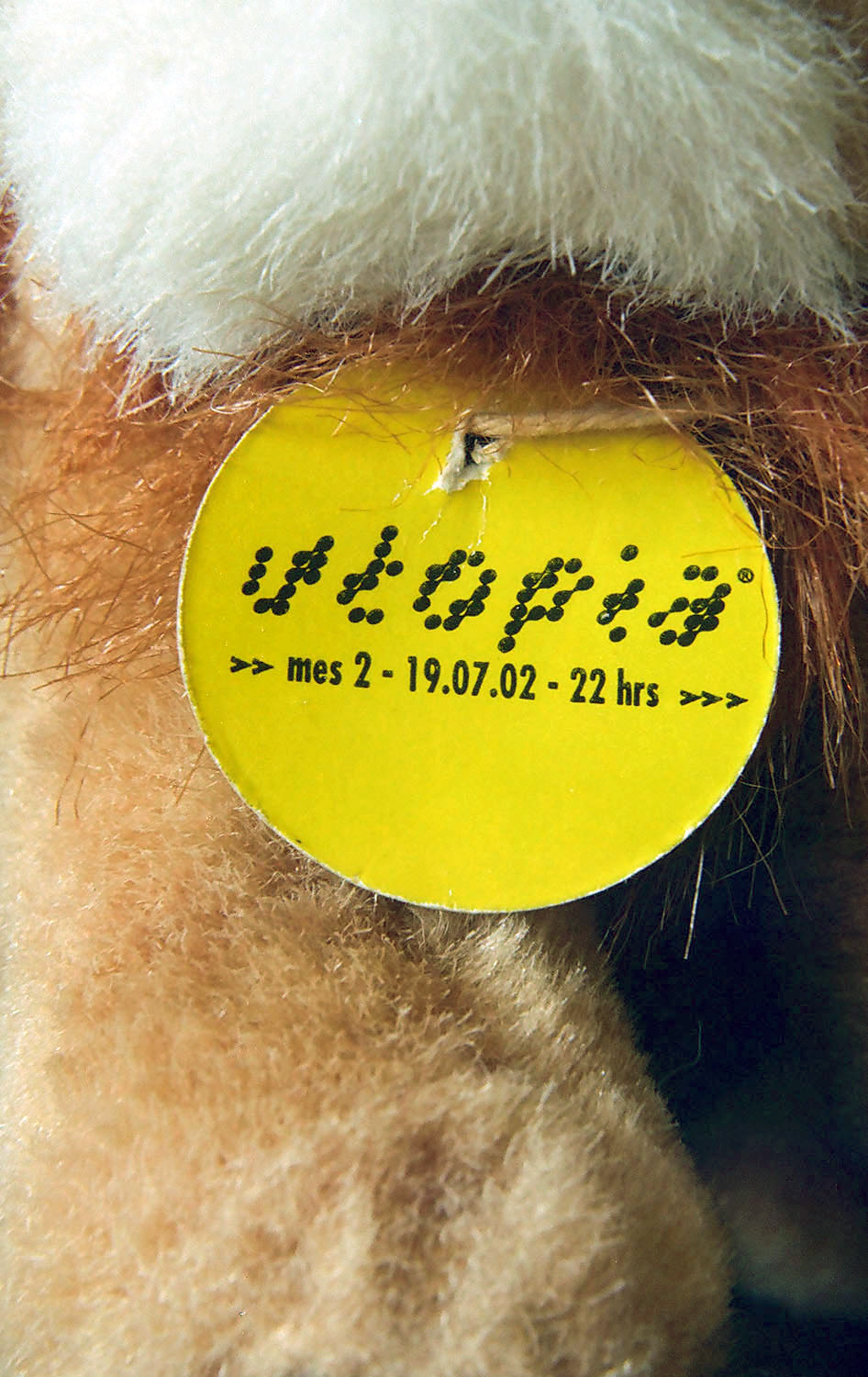
- Pin promoting the event
- Date: 20 July 2002; 24 years ago
- Time: 3:15 a.m. (PET)
- Location: Jockey Plaza (1E-A), 4200 Javier Prado Este, Santiago de Surco, Lima; 12°5′6.80168″S 76°58′34.08877″W
- Cause: Ignition of acoustic foam during a torch juggling show
- Deaths: 29
- Injuries: 54

The Utopía nightclub fire started at 3:15 a.m. (PET) on July 20, 2002, in the Jockey Plaza shopping centre, located in Santiago de Surco, Lima, Peru, killing 29 people and injuring 54 others.

== Background ==
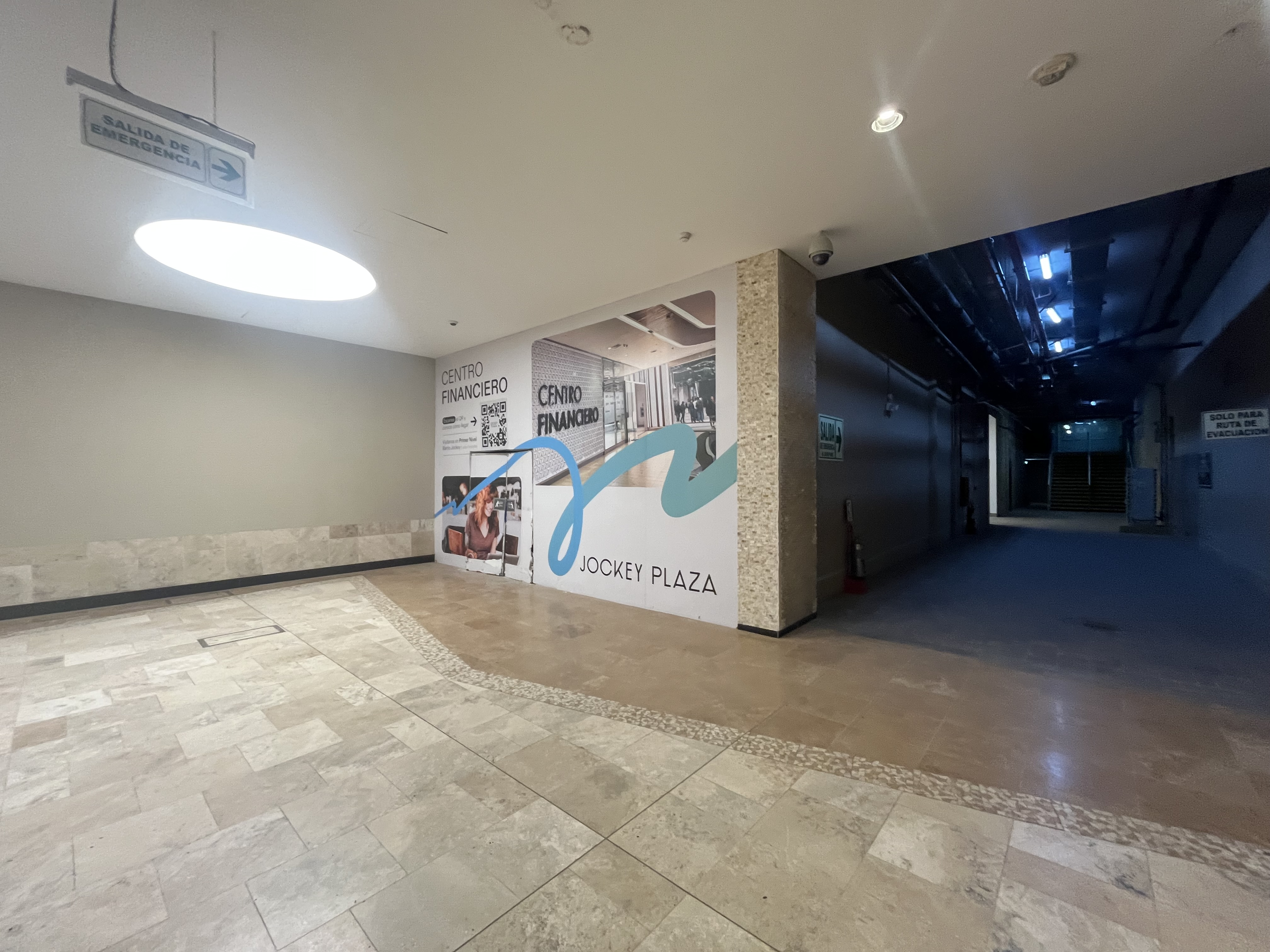
Site of the former entrance in 2025.

The Utopía nightclub was inaugurated on May 4, 2002, and was located on the first level of the Jockey Plaza shopping centre in a 870 m² space. The nightclub did not have an operating license from the Municipality of Santiago de Surco because it did not meet the minimum Civil Defence (INDECI) standards, lacking basic equipment such as fire extinguishers.

On July 19, the nightclub organized a party called Zoo, on the occasion of the launch of a fragrance by designer Hugo Boss. The administration of the nightclub contracted with the Mexican circus Los Hermanos Fuentes Gasca the presence in its premises of a lion, a bengal tiger, a chimpanzee and a horse. The animals, some from their cages, would give the show atmosphere. Despite only being able to house about 500 people, the administration had sent out more than 3,000 double invitations. In addition, the party coincided with the neighboring concert of Los Prisioneros at the Jockey Club.

== Fire ==
At 2 a.m. on Saturday, in the booth that corresponds to the disk jockeys, a show with animals and fire was started. According to some of the survivors, to the side of the dance floor and in front of the DJ booth, several cans of gasoline had been placed to form a rectangle that suggested the stage for the show. In front were two large cages, one for the tiger and the other for the lion, while the chimpanzee and the horse were loose.

When the show's organisers approached with lit torches to light the cans of gasoline, one raised their torch too high, allowing the flame to reach the false wooden ceiling. This ignited the ceiling's acoustic foam, and the area was on fire within seconds. Many of the show's spectators began to flee from both levels of the nightclub to the only exit door that was marked, while those closest to the fire attempted to help. Hoping to put it out, they threw beer and spirits on the blaze, which only fanned the flames.

On account of the situation, the shopping centre's staff disconnected the electricity supply, cutting off the music and causing the lights to go out. Amid rumours that the caged animals had escaped in the dark, causing panic, the attendees called the fire brigade. When the rescue teams arrived, accompanied by police, they discovered that the enitre nightclub was flooded with smoke, and found bodies lying on the ground, people in shock, and other attendees desperately searching for their friends.

There were 29 young people who died poisoned by the gases that were emitted when burning the plastic material with which the columns of the premises were covered. In addition, the three-level venue became a death trap for the approximately 1,000 attendees, as it was found that there were no marked emergency exits. They also did not have fire extinguishers, alarms or water sprinklers.

== Reactions ==
Then president of Peru Alejandro Toledo expressed his dismay on Saturday morning and extended his condolences "to the relatives of the young people who lost their lives in the nightclub." Toledo said that the authorities "will punish with a strong and firm hand and with the full weight of the law the irresponsible people who run these establishments in breach of the law."

The then mayor of the district of Surco, Carlos Dargent, blamed the incident on the owners of the nightclub, which lacked municipal licenses, neither for construction nor for operation, and the concessionaires of the Jockey Plaza Shopping Center, who, according to the mayor, allowed the operation of the nightclub without meeting the minimum security conditions.

Then mayor of Lima Alberto Andrade proposed that all nightclubs and mass entertainment centers be closed for 60 days so that firefighters, Civil Defense and the communes themselves can verify which venues meet the required safety standards.

In August 2002, the Congress of the Republic approved the formation of an investigative commission on the nightclub fire, which was chaired by Jorge Mufarech and made up of Luis Gonzales Posada, Fabiola Morales, Manuel Bustamante and Jorge Mera. The commission presented its final report in January 2004.

== Investigation ==
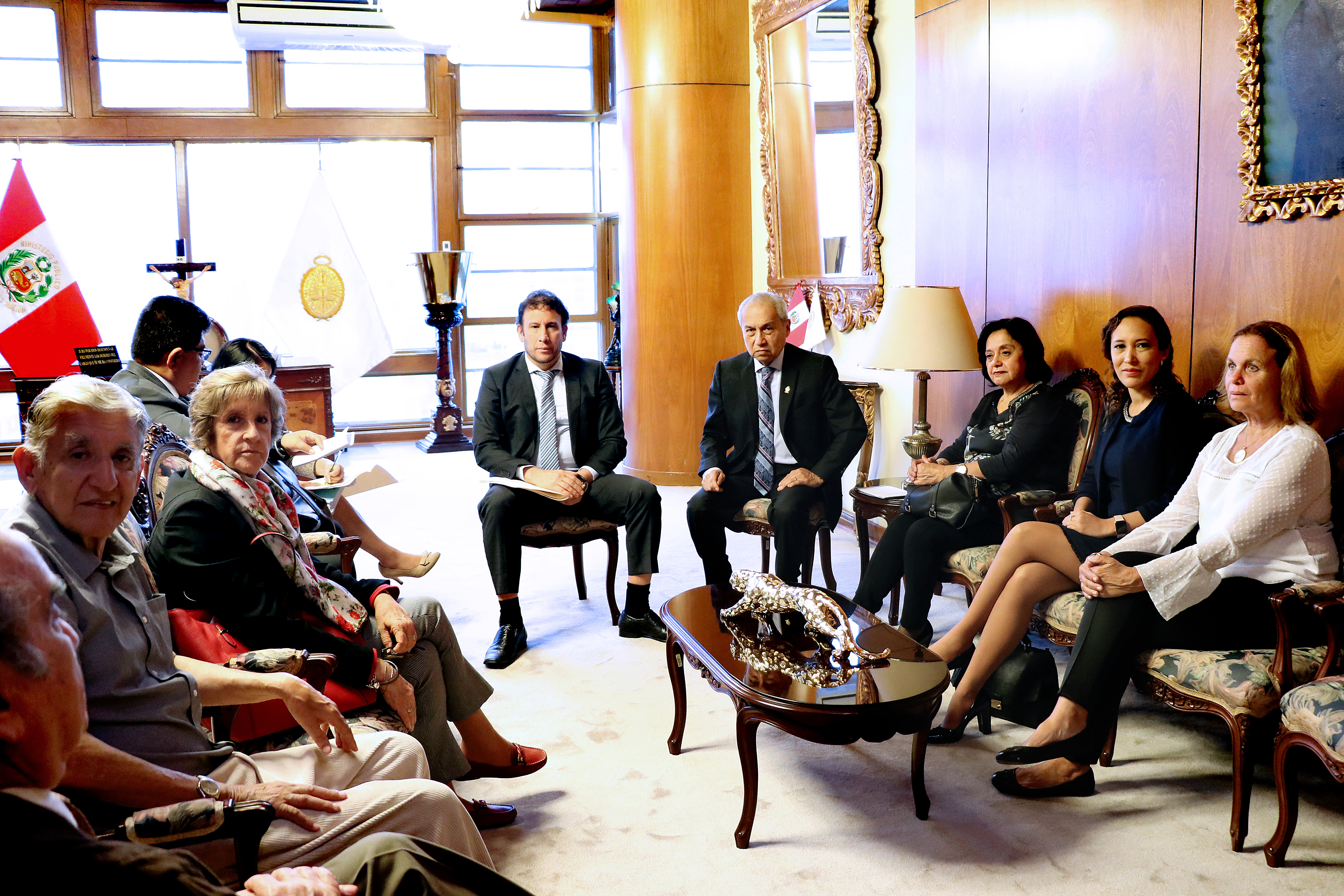
Then national prosecutor Pedro Chávarry together with relatives of those who died in Utopia in 2018.

After the tragedy, the parents of the victims filed a lawsuit against the local administrators: Percy North, Alan Azizollahoff Gate, Édgar Paz Ravines and with the minority shareholder Fahed Mitre.

In 2004 Percy North was sentenced for manslaughter to 4 years in prison, but months later the sentence was annulled pending the formalization of intentional. This did not happen; The prosecution accused him of the same crime and it was Judge Miguel Bazán who, in 2006, had to change the classification and managed to sentence him to 15 years for intentional homicide. However, North appealed the sentence and managed to lower the sentence to 10 years. On the other hand, the singer Fahed Miter was declared innocent and no penalty was applied; however, the artist preferred to retire a considerable number of years from music.

In July 2013, the Constitutional and Social Permanent Chamber of the Supreme Court of Justice decided to reopen the Utopia case. Alan Azizollahoff and Édgar Paz Ravines were sentenced on April 8 to an effective prison sentence of four years and to the payment of civil compensation of S/.70 thousand in solidarity in favor of the relatives of the 29 young people who died on July 20, 2002. The crime was manslaughter by intentional omission.

After the 4-year sentence was handed down for Alan Azizollahoff and Edgar Paz in 2014, both would have already fled Peru, which is why the Court ordered that both defendants be notified at their real addresses and requested their international capture. At that time, Azizollahoff was in Miami and Paz was in Mexico.

On the other hand, the ex-administrator of Utopia, Percy North, who was sentenced to 10 years in prison for the crime of intentional homicide; he was released on July 8, 2015, after spending 7 years in prison. North served part of his sentence between 2004 and 2007, then he was jailed again in 2011 until 2015.

On November 12, 2018, Édgar Jesús Paz Ravines was captured by Interpol in Mexico after having been a fugitive for 16 years. However, despite the fact that it was estimated that his extradition process to Peru would last around 6 months, on December 3, 2019 (after almost 13 months of his arrest) it was reported that said process was "suspended", due to because Paz's defense in Mexico filed an amparo trial to stop the extradition process against him.

On February 13, 2020, the Judiciary of Mexico approved the extradition of Édgar Jesús Paz Ravines to Peru.

On February 27, 2020, the South African Ministry of Justice accepted the extradition request for Alan Azizollahoff, after having been a fugitive from Peruvian justice for 18 years. This news would culminate the capture of both those responsible convicted of the tragedy of the Utopia nightclub.

On August 26, 2020, in the midst of the health crisis caused by the coronavirus pandemic, the Judiciary of Peru announced that the extradition process for Edgar Paz Ravines would be finalized on September 5 of the same year. The Peruvian embassy in Mexico informed Interpol that there were no legal reasons not to proceed with the handover of Paz. This happened satisfactorily, through a humanitarian flight, Paz was transferred from Mexico to Peru to comply with his sentence.

== See also ==
- Utopia (2018 film), based on the fire
- List of nightclub fires
- Kiss nightclub fire, also caused by the ignition of acoustic foam
- Los Olivos stampede, also took place in Peru
- Las Malvinas fire, also caused by negligence
