= Milagros Zavaleta Apestegui =

Peruvian biologist

MILAGROS ZAVALETA
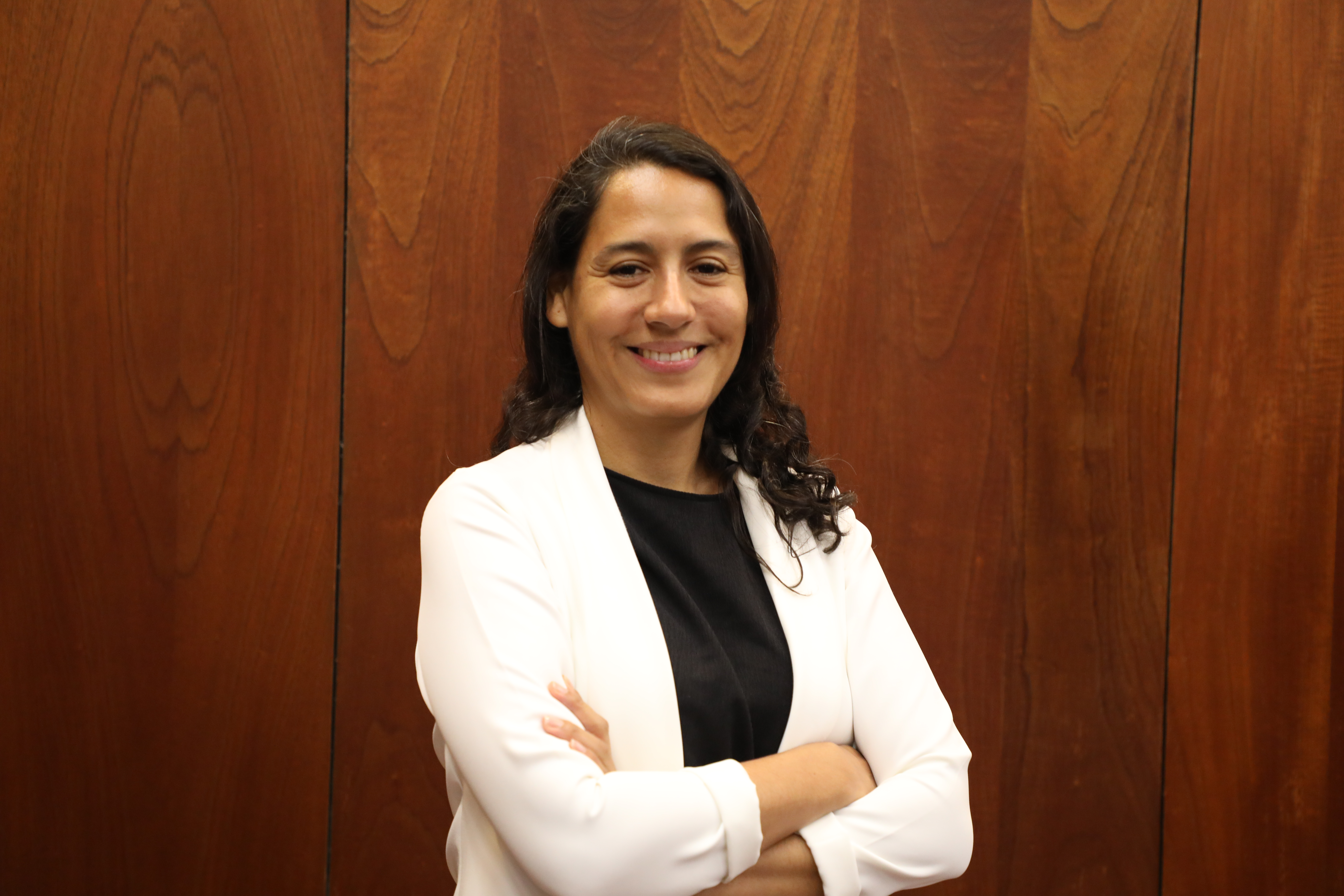
- Born: 1981 (age 44–45); Callao
- Education: National University of San Marcos
- Scientific career
- Fields: Molecular Biology and Biotechnology
- Workplaces: BTS Consultores S.A.C

Milagros Zavaleta Apestegui (born in Lima 1981) is a molecular biologist and entrepreneur, played an important role in the Covid-19 pandemic in Perú, developing a molecular diagnostic kit for COVID-19 (CavBio).

The kit was developed at BTS Consultores, together with the Center for Technological, Biomedical and Environmental Research of the University of San Marcos, of which years ago she was project coordinator and one of the founding members of the center, which benefited many Peruvian companies and individuals.

== Biography ==
Milagros Zavaleta Apestegui was born in 1981 in the city of Callao Bellavista, daughter of Pedro Zavaleta and Yolanda Apéstegui. She attended the Universidad Nacional Mayor de San Marcos, where she obtained her professional degree with a thesis developed in the laboratories in infectious diseases, graduated from the Master in Biochemistry and Molecular Biology at the Cayetano Heredia National University, and obtained a second Master in Business Innovation and Sustainability from EADA Business School - Spain.

== Career ==
She carried out his thesis project at the Research and Development Laboratories (LID) under the direction of Dr. Gilman, a researcher at the prestigious Johns Hopkins University. His research focused on patients with brucellosis infections, with the objective of extracting DNA and analyzing possible changes in their genetic structure (mutations). During this process, she received guidance from Melisa Méndez. Subsequently, she was hired to work in the Malaria and Chagas projects directed by Dr. Gilman, which allowed her to partially finance her master's degree in Biochemistry and Molecular Biology at the Cayetano Heredia National University.

She later joined the Prisma Charitable Association, where he participated in the development of molecular tests and diagnostics. She also worked at Farmacológicos Veterinarios S.A.C., contributing to the development of recombinant vaccines. As part of her research career, she held the position of Research Coordinator at the Center for Technological, Biomedical and Environmental Research (CITBM), an institution she helped found thanks to funding from the National Council for Science, Technology and Technological Innovation (CONCYTEC), in this role, she was in charge of the design of projects focused on biotechnological development.

Subsequently, she founded BTS Consultores together with Enrique Saravia, a company in which she assumed the positions of research director and general manager. From this position, she led the development of molecular diagnostic kits (CavBio) in collaboration with her team, formed by Luis Enrique Saravia Cahuana and his partner Aldo Flores Pérez.

In addition, she headed the team that achieved the Good Manufacturing Practices (GMP) certification of the first production plant for in vitro diagnostic medical devices in Peru, thus consolidating an important advance in the country's biotechnology sector.

== Scientific production ==
She has led the development of a molecular diagnostic kit for COVID-19, a project that was made possible after obtaining a grant from Innóvate Perú. This initiative was carried out through BTS Consultores S.A.C., in collaboration with the Center for Technological, Biomedical and Environmental Research of the University of San Marcos..

She has experience in recombinant vaccine research and in the development of diagnostic and molecular typing methods for poultry diseases; and in cloning techniques, recombinant protein expression and recombinant vaccine design and evaluation.

== Awards and recognitions ==
- 2020. MINSA recognizes the valuable contribution of researchers for the development of rapid molecular tests in the country with a diagnostic kit for Covid 2019.
- 2022.The Metropolitan Municipality of Lima awards Diploma accrediting the award in the Science and Health category in recognition of the trajectory and experience in molecular biology, biotechnology and tropical diseases.
- 2021. It was awarded by the Vinculación Universidad - Empresa en Ciencias with the prize for the project “Validation and Packaging of a molecular kit for the diagnosis of COVID-19” carried out in association with the Universidad Nacional Mayor de San Marcos. Association of Research, Development and Innovation Network IDI Network.
- 2021. Invited to the conference given by the President of the Republic Francisco Sagasti highlighting the role of Peruvian women in favor of science. CONCYTEC.
- 2023. She was recognized by the Commission of Women and Family of the Congress of the Republic of Peru, for her high human values that she was able to transmit in her scientific career as a biologist, contributing to the prevention of health and the fight against COVID-19, marking a milestone in the history of the country.
- 2023. She stands out as one of the 5 people in the book Guardianas de la salud: a book that narrates the valuable work of five women scientists that seeks to make visible the contribution of Peruvian women researchers in science
