= Acoustic foam =

Open-celled foam used for sound absorption

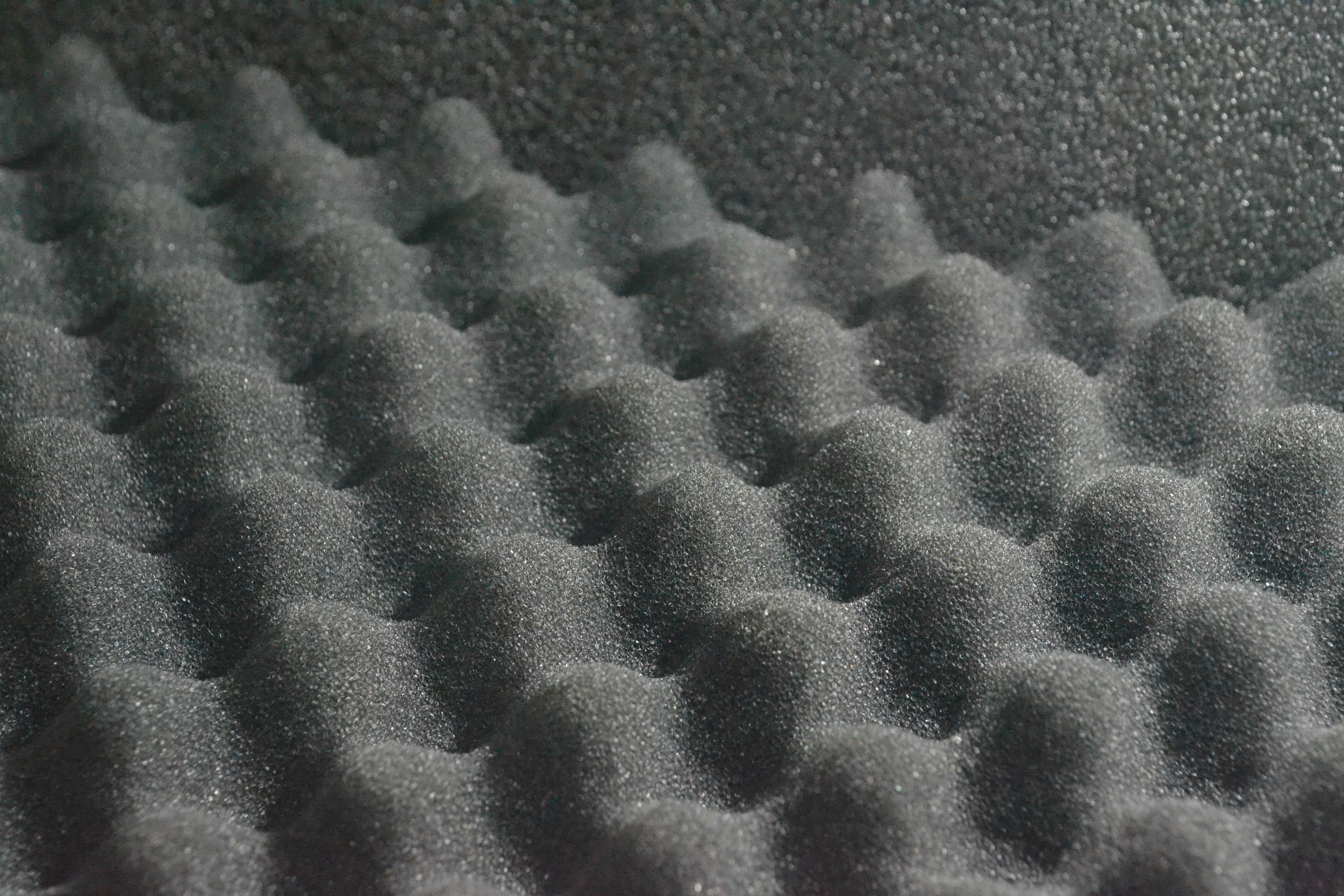
A close-up image of polyurethane acoustic foam.

Acoustic foam is an open-celled foam used for acoustic treatment. It attenuates airborne sound-waves, reducing their amplitude, for the purposes of noise reduction or noise control. The energy is dissipated as heat. Acoustic foam is primarily made from petroleum-based polyurethane, though some types use melamine. The foam can be made in several different colors, sizes, and thicknesses.

Acoustic foam is often used in recording studios, home cinemas, or nightclubs to control noise, vibrations, and echoes. The foam can be attached to walls, ceilings, doors, and other features of a room. Due to its oil-based character, acoustic foam can be flammable, and has been associated with several fire disasters. To mitigate this risk, many acoustic foam products are treated with fire retardants.

== Uses ==
The objective of acoustic foam is to improve or change a room's sound qualities by controlling residual sound through absorption. This purpose requires strategic placement of acoustic foam panels on walls, ceilings, floors and other surfaces. Proper placement can help effectively manage resonance within the room and help give the room the desired sonic qualities.

=== Acoustic enhancement ===
The objective of acoustic foam is to enhance the sonic properties of a room by effectively managing unwanted reverberations. For this reason, acoustic foam is often used in restaurants, performance spaces, and recording studios. Acoustic foam is also often installed in large rooms with large, reverberative surfaces like gymnasiums, places of worship, theaters, and concert halls where excess reverberation is prone to arise. The purpose is to reduce, but not eliminate, resonance within the room. In unmanaged spaces without acoustic foam or similar sound absorbing materials, sound waves reflect off of surfaces and continue to bounce around in the room. When a wave encounters a change in acoustic impedance, such as hitting a solid surface, acoustic reflections transpire. These reflections will occur many times before the wave becomes inaudible. Reflections can cause acoustic problems such as phase summation and phase cancellation. A new complex wave originates when the direct source wave coincides with the reflected waves. This complex wave will change the frequency response of the source material.

=== Functionality ===
Acoustic foam is a lightweight material made from polyurethane (either polyether or polyester) or extruded melamine foam. It is usually cut into tiles. One surface of these tiles often features pyramid, cone, wedge, or uneven cuboid shapes. Acoustic foam tiles are suited to placing on sonically-reflective surfaces to act as sound-absorbers, thus enhancing or changing the sound-properties of a room.

This type of sound-absorption is different from soundproofing, which is typically used to keep sound from escaping or entering a room rather than changing the properties of sound within the room itself.

Acoustic foam panels typically suppress reverberations in the mid and high frequencies. To deal with lower frequencies, much thicker pieces of acoustic foam (often in metal or wood enclosures) can be placed in the corners of a room and are called acoustic foam bass traps.

== Testing and standards ==
The acoustic performance of foam products is typically characterized by the absorption coefficient, measured across a range of frequencies. Two principal laboratory methods are used.

In the reverberation room method (ISO 354), a sample of the material is placed in a large reverberant chamber and the change in reverberation time is measured before and after installation. This yields the random-incidence absorption coefficient at standard octave or third-octave band center frequencies from 100 Hz to 5000 Hz. In North America, the results from this test are used to calculate the noise reduction coefficient (NRC) or sound absorption average (SAA) in accordance with ASTM C423.

The impedance tube method (ISO 10534-2) uses a smaller apparatus to determine the normal-incidence absorption coefficient of a circular sample. This method requires less material and is faster to perform, but only measures absorption at perpendicular incidence rather than the diffuse-field conditions of ISO 354.

Manufacturers typically report NRC values ranging from approximately 0.4 for thin (25 mm) flat foam panels to above 0.9 for thicker (100 mm) profiled products, though the actual performance depends on the foam density, cell structure, surface profile, and mounting conditions.

== Hazards ==
Unless acoustic foam has undergone mitigations to make it fire retardant, such as chemical treatments, the flexible polyurethane foam material is combustible and has been associated with several fire disasters:

Date	Deaths	Injuries	Disaster
2002-07-20	29	54	Utopía nightclub fire
2003-02-20	100	230	The Station nightclub fire
2013-01-27	242	630	Kiss nightclub fire
2015-10-30	64	146	Colectiv nightclub fire
2016-08-06	14	6	Cuba Libre bar fire
2025-03-16	63	193	Kočani nightclub fire
2026-01-01	41	116	Crans-Montana bar fire
2026-07-12	34	70+	2026 Bangkok pub fire

== See also ==
- Anechoic chamber
- Bushing (isolator)
- Polystyrene
- Polyurethane
- Sorbothane
- Soundproofing
- Styrofoam
- Vibration isolation
