= Las Malvinas fire =

Deadly 2017 fire in Lima, Peru

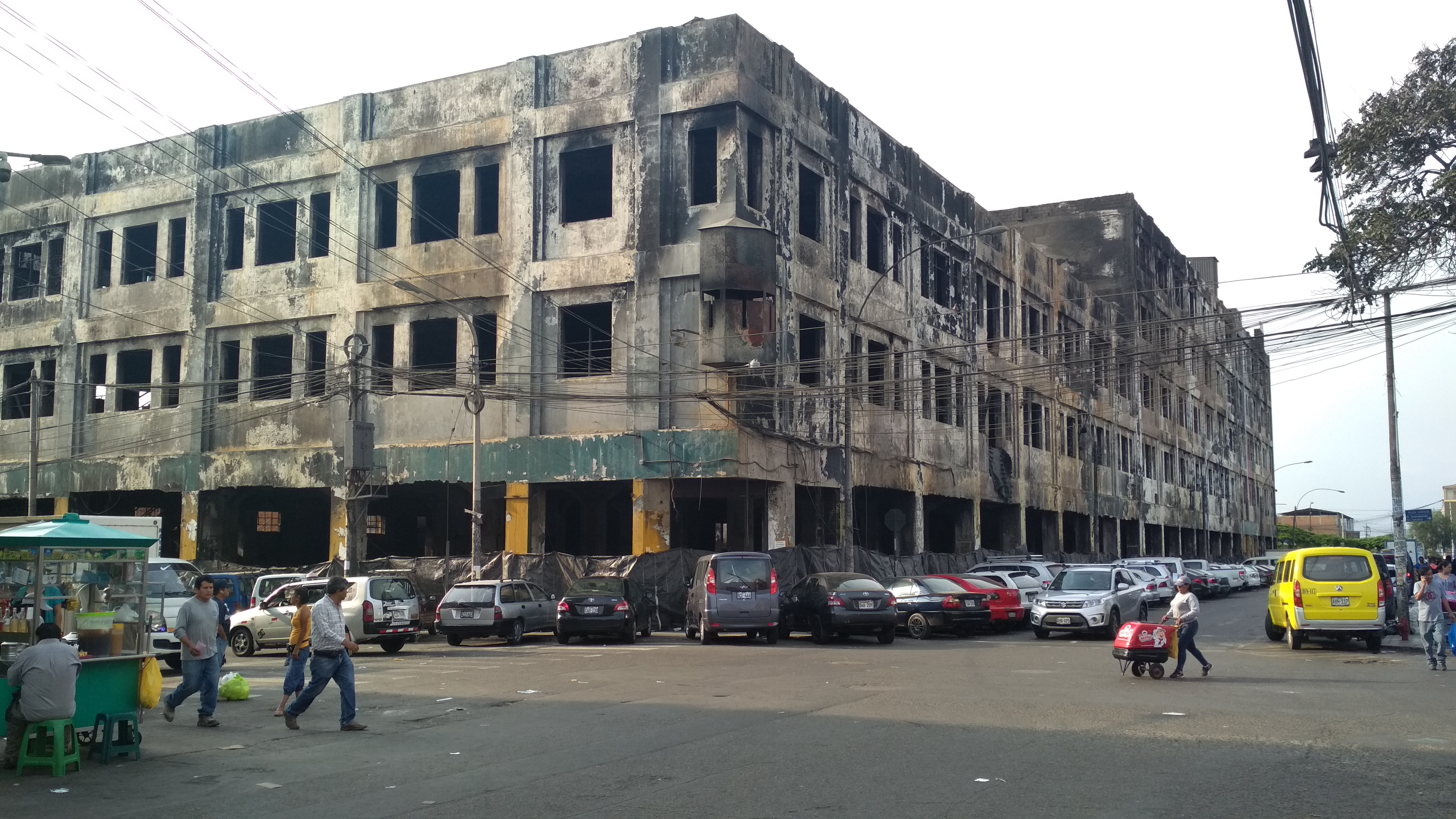
- Aftermath of the fire
- Date: 22–27 June 2017
- Time: 12:00 p.m. (PET)
- Location: Las Malvinas shopping centre, Lima, Peru
- Cause: Ignition of a pail of paint thinner due to negligence
- Deaths: 2
- Injuries: 89

The Las Malvinas fire started at 12:00 p.m. (PET) on June 22, 2017, and ended five days later on June 27. The fire occurred in the Las Malvinas shopping centre, Lima, Peru. It was the eighth fire registered in Lima in 2017 and the most serious of the year. Losses were estimated at $2 million. As a result of the incident, 2 deaths and 89 injuries were recorded.

== Fire ==
Peruvian president Pedro Pablo Kuczynski talks about the situation on site

The fire originated in the JPEG SAC hardware shopping centre and then spread to the Nicolini shopping centre. One of the causes is related to the negligence of an employee, in addition, the company that was fined for not complying with safety regulations had to transfer the workers to the containers placed informally at the top of the shopping centre.

During the first hours the fire grew considerably, reaching the classification of "Grade 5" by Peruvian firefighters. 900 firefighters were summoned in 72 hours.

On the 23rd of the same month, the fire continued after 20 hours of uninterrupted work distributed between rescue work and containment of the flames. On June 24 it was possible to appease the flames.

== Aftermath ==
The people who lived and worked in the premises in the area near the accident were evacuated. The Ramón Castilla hospital operated by EsSalud was closed. The premises where the affected companies shared space was closed by order of the Metropolitan Municipality of Lima.

The smoke was seen from districts far from the shopping centre such as San Martín de Porres, Los Olivos, Comas, San Isidro, Jesús María or Carmen de la Legua Reynoso. In addition, several educational institutions closed their classes. People who were 10 blocks away had to evacuate to a place further away. One day after the fire started, all the rooms smelled of burning plastic due to the toxic fumes in the air.

The man who started the fire, Einstein Vásquez Acuña, admitted to starting the fire to show his brother the dangers of doing so after being arrested.

The building that housed the Nicolini gallery was condemned in 2019 and set to be demolished.

== See also ==
- Mesa Redonda fire
