= Tottus =

South American supermarket chain

- Trade name: Tottus
- Formerly: Supermercados San Francisco
- Type: Subsidiary
- Industry: Retail
- Predecessor: Supermercados San Francisco
- Founded: 2002
- Headquarters: Santiago, Chile
- Number of locations: 157 (2019) (2019)
- Area served: Peru, Chile
- Products: Groceries, household goods, general merchandise
- Services: Supermarkets, hypermarkets
- Owner: S.A.C.I. Falabella
- Parent: S.A.C.I. Falabella

Tottus is a chain of supermarkets and hypermarkets owned by the Chilean retail company S.A.C.I. Falabella, with a presence in both Peru and Chile. As of 2019, Tottus had 157 locations; 89 in Peru and 70 in Chile.

== History ==
The company was established in 2002, opened its first supermarket in the Lima Norte area of Lima, Peru. In order to expand into the supermarket sector, Falabella bought the company "Supermercados San Francisco" from the Leyton Group in July 2004 for US$62.5 million. The first hypermarket with the Tottus brand was opened in Puente Alto, Santiago de Chile on 14 December 2005.
