= Falabella (retail store) =

Chilean retail company

- Industry: Retail
- Founded: Santiago, Chile (1889)
- Founder: Salvatore Falabella
- Headquarters: Santiago, Chile
- Number of locations: 100
- Area served: Chile, Colombia, Peru
- Products: Clothing, footwear, accessories, bedding, furniture, jewelry, beauty products, and housewares
- Number of employees: 65,000
- Parent: S.A.C.I. Falabella
- Website: falabella.com

Falabella is a multinational chain of department stores owned by Chilean multinational company S.A.C.I. Falabella. It is the largest South American department store, and a member of the International Association of Department Stores (since 2006).

== History ==
The company was founded by Salvatore Falabella Cardone, an Italian immigrant from Naples, in 1889 in Santiago, Chile. It was originally a tailor's shop, but today has become the largest retailer in South America. The expansion of the company began in the 1960s, with the first store outside Santiago opened in Concepción. In 1980 Falabella created CMR, a credit card with 5.5 million customers. In the 1990s it began a process of internationalization and expanded its operations to Argentina, Peru (where it traded as Saga Falabella until 2018) and Colombia. Some of the celebrities who have appeared in its ads are Cecilia Bolocco, Valeria Mazza, Juanes, Kate Moss, Gisele Bündchen and Ricky Martin

On May 17, 2007, Falabella agreed to merge with D & S to form the largest retail company in Chile, but a ruling of the Court of Defense of Free Competition on January 31, 2008, rejected the operation, giving as fundamental arguments that the merger would produce a huge change in the market structure, creating a company that would be the dominant player in integrated retail and all its segments and a substantial and lasting decrease in the conditions of competition of the market that would be detrimental to consumers. The same year, Falabella acquired 60% of the largest hardware store in Chile, Imperial.

In 2012, Subtel accepted the request made by Falabella to become a Mobile Virtual Operator inaugurating the service during the first quarter of 2012. In the second quarter of the same year, the chain opened another store in Bogotá, in the Titán Plaza Shopping Center.

In August 2018, it acquired 100% of the Linio Marketplace, in order to accelerate its omnichannel and electronic commerce strategy.

In January 2019, the closing of Linio Ecuador and Panama was announced with the aim of focusing efforts in countries where it has strategic capabilities to improve the value proposition of its market platform.

During 2020, due to the pandemic, Falabella constantly supported the community with the program "Programa Haciendo Escuela", which since 1969 has been contributing comprehensively to the students and families of the schools it sponsors. In April of that year was adapted and “Haciendo Escuela en tu casa” was born, available to all children in Chile with educational content from the Mineduc and also with didactic and recreative material.

In that same month, Falabella Retail, together with Linio and Sodimac, made their websites available to microentrepreneurs affected by the Covid - 19 crisis. The new sellers were not charged sales commission for 3 months. In addition, they have received training to develop skills in the world of e-commerce.

Falabella Retail joined the “Fundación Artesanías de Chile” campaign “United by artisans”. This meant that the foundation was added as a seller, making visible the textile work, wood carving, basketry, pottery and goldsmithing of 2,300 artisans who make up the foundation.

Another example was the launch of Arte Falabella, which aims to democratize art and bring it closer to everyone. In October 2020 Espacio Fotografía was launched, with more than 300 commercially unpublished works by 39 emerging and established artists from Chile. The project was developed together with the Antenna Foundation, the Latin American Art curator, Matías Allende, and the advice of Paz Errázuriz, renowned Chilean photographer and 2017 National Art Award.

It was announced that Linio will be ceasing operations in Mexico for April 8, 2024 to focus on their collaboration with Soriana on their expansion of Sodimac and his target Falabella Soriana.

== Gallery ==
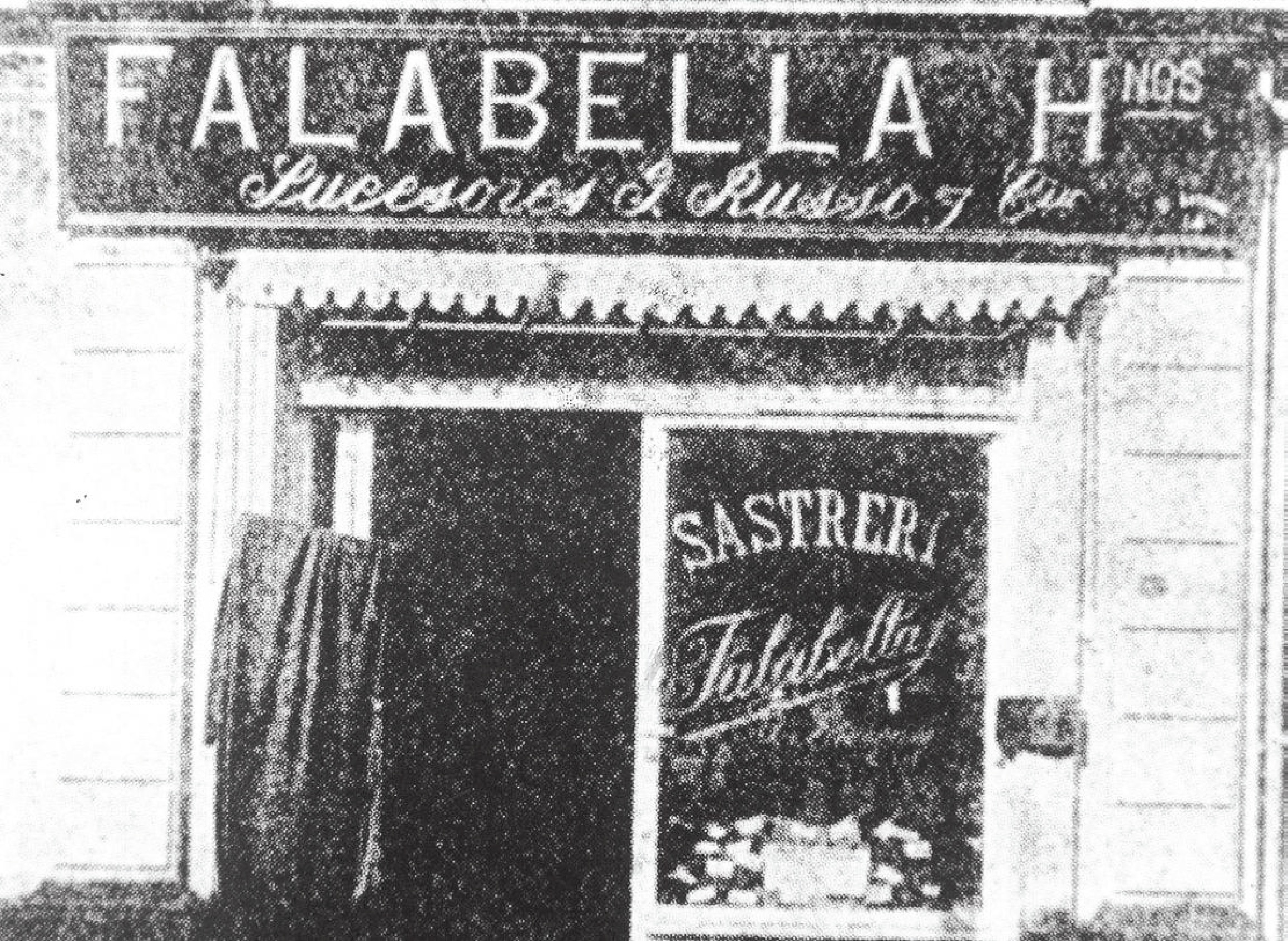
In the 20th century

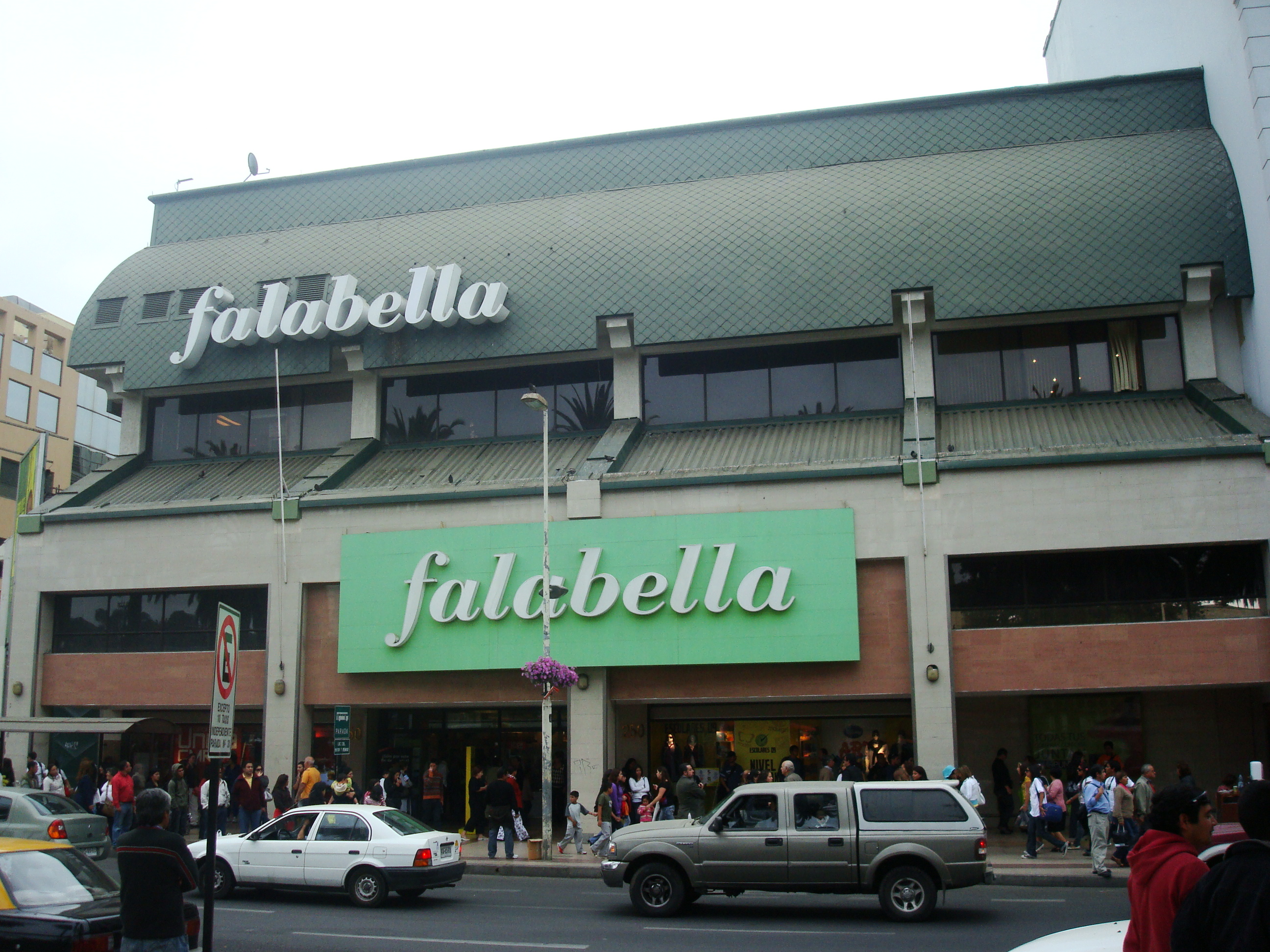
Store in Viña del Mar with the classic design of the logo

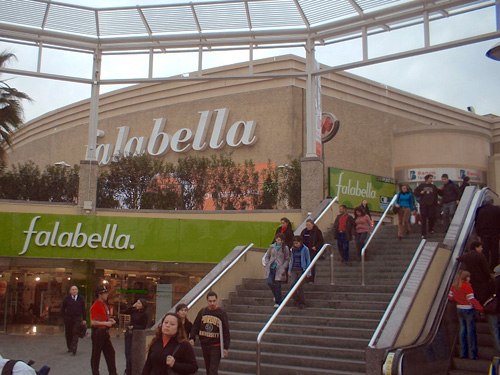
Store in the Mall Plaza Vespucio
