= Calle Tarata =

Street in Lima, Peru

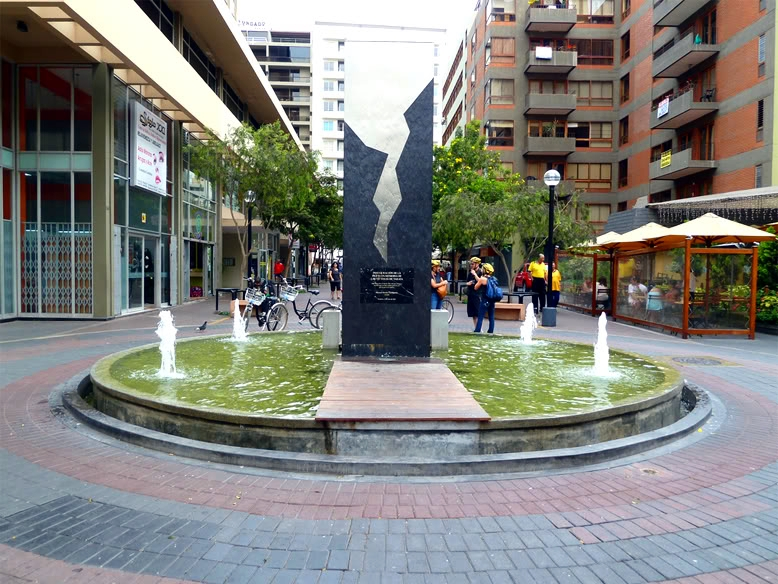
- Interactive map of Calle Tarata
- Namesake: Tarata province
- Type: Pedestrian street
- Location: Miraflores District, Lima
- From: Alcanfores Street
- Major junctions: José Larco Avenue; Pasaje Berlín
- To: José Larco Avenue

Other
- Known for: 1992 Tarata bombing

Tarata Street (Spanish: Calle Tarata) is a pedestrian street in Miraflores, Lima, Peru. It runs from east to west for 2 blocks, and is located adjacent to José Larco Avenue. It is best known for the 1992 terrorist attack carried out by the Shining Path at its second block.

== Name ==
The street is named after the province of the same name, located in the department of Tacna. It is also known as the Solidarity Promenade (Spanish: Paseo de la Solidaridad) since 1994.

== History ==
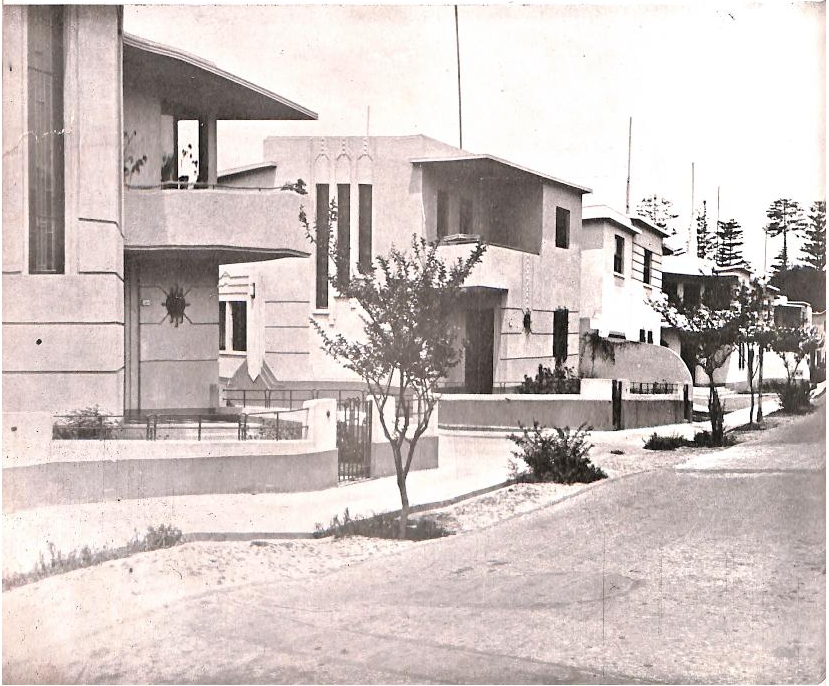
The street in 1938.

Throughout its history, the street has mostly maintained a residential character. In 1938, a row of residences was built almost in its entirety along its southern side, designed in the Streamline Moderne style by architect Augusto Guzmán and jointly owned by locals Mr. Behr and Mr. Gamboa.

For most of its history, the street was one of many roads open to regular traffic in the district. It intersects to the west with José Larco Avenue, one of the district's main thoroughfares, and is located one block away from the Municipal Palace and the district's central park, Miraflores' de facto main square.

=== Terrorist attack ===
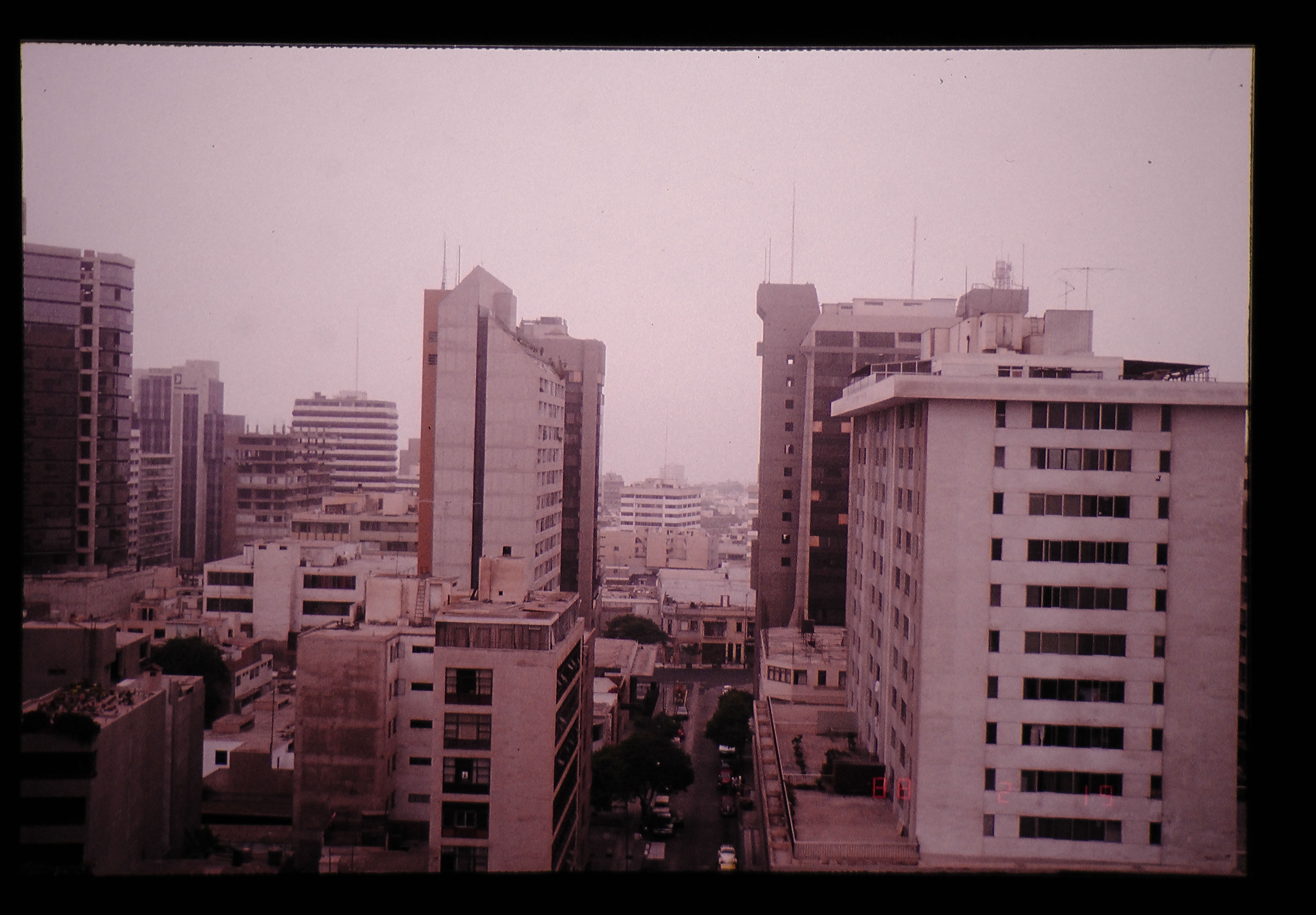
The street in 1988.

On July 16, 1992, a guinda-coloured Datsun automobile carrying 400 kg of explosives was detonated by Shining Path members at the street's second block. The blast killed 25 people, with 155 others injured and 5 missing. The intended target was a branch of the Banco de Crédito del Perú, located at the street's intersection with José Larco Avenue. The attack damaged residential buildings El Condado, San Pedro, Tarata, Residencial Central San Carlos, and San Hilarión, all located in the street and damaged to varying degrees. Also located in the street at the time were a number of businesses (including Mass, a 24-hour convenience store) and banks (including the Banco Hipotecario, Banco Continental, Interbanc, Banco Popular, Banco Industrial, and a finance company known as San Pedro). The attack caused over US$ 3,120,000 in property damages and the National Institute of Civil Defence reported that 360 families were affected.

At the time of the attack, the street was open to transit, but was later turned into a pedestrian-only street known as "Solidarity Promenade" (Paseo de la Solidaridad). The new street and a commemorative monument were both inaugurated in a ceremony that took place on July 16, 1994.

=== Recent history ===
Since 1992, the street has gradually become a gastronomic hotspot and a local gathering place. In 2004, the Café de la Paz—one of the district's emblematic bistros—opened its second branch in the street. A Starbucks café opened in 2015. Other restaurants include patisseries and restaurants serving European and Peruvian cuisine.

On May 26, 2015, a microfinance bank was attacked with a grenade. On August 20, 2018, a man was killed in what was presumably a settling of scores.

The street was renovated in 2022.

== Route ==
The street runs from east to west for two blocks, connecting Larco with Alcanfores street, and intersects with the Pasaje Berlín. Its second block is divided into two parts by Larco Avenue.

== See also ==
- Bulevar San Ramón, another street in the district turned pedestrian promenade in the late 20th century.
