= La Lucha =

Peruvian sandwich restaurant chain

La Lucha Sanguchería Criolla
- Type: Private
- Industry: Restaurants
- Founded: 15 August 2009; 17 years ago in Miraflores, Lima
- Founder: César Taboada
- Headquarters: Lima, Peru
- Area served: Peru, Colombia, Chile, Mexico
- Products: Sandwiches, juices
- Parent: Lucha Partners
- Website: lalucha.com.pe

Branch at Larco and Diez Canseco streets, Miraflores District, Lima, July 2025

Branch on Oscar Wilde street, Polanquito, Polanco, Mexico City, November 2026

Branch at Larco and Capac streets, Miraflores, Lima - Menu board, July 2025

Chicha Morada dispenser

La Lucha Sanguchería Criolla, commonly known as La Lucha, is a Peruvian chain of sangucherías (sandwich shops) serving criollo-style sandwiches and fresh fruit juices. Founded in 2009 in the Miraflores district of Lima, it has grown to more than a dozen locations across Peru and has expanded through franchising to Colombia, Chile and Mexico.

== History ==
La Lucha was founded on 15 August 2009 by César Taboada, together with an American business partner, in Miraflores. Taboada, a native of Piura, had trained in mechanical and electrical engineering and accounting. The first shop occupied a premises of only 12 square metres. Despite the name, there was no "Lucha" behind the business; according to Taboada, the name refers to the lucha (struggle) of Peru's many small entrepreneurs.

The chain grew slowly at first. Taboada said that shopping centres had refused to rent to the company before it opened its shop facing Parque Kennedy in Miraflores, but began offering space afterwards; in 2012 it was preparing to open in the Larcomar mall. At the time it was opening about two locations a year. Soon after, it had shops in Miraflores, including Larcomar, and at the Óvalo Gutiérrez in San Isidro. By 2018 La Lucha had seven locations in Lima, one in Arequipa and three in Trujillo, as well as a branch at Jorge Chávez International Airport. Around the same time it opened a central production plant to standardize the products served across its shops. The plant, in Surquillo, supplies the chain's bread, fruit and other ingredients.

The chain is owned by Lucha Partners, which also operates the restaurant brands Siete Sopas, La Fuente de Soda and Pica Pollo. In 2023 the average spend per customer at La Lucha was S/ 25–30. In February 2025 the chain opened a shop in the Centro Comercial Cánepa in Gamarra, Lima's textile market district. By 2025 it had 18 locations in Peru, with five more planned in Lima.

== Georgraphical presence ==
=== Peru ===
As of 2025-2026 there were an estimated 24 restaurants in Peru including in Lima, Trujillo, and Arequipa.

Geographical Coverage in Peru (partial list, November 2026)

#	City	District or area	Branch	Address
1	Lima	Miraflores	Diagonal	Avenida Diagonal 308
2	Lima	Miraflores	Larco 999	Avenida José Larco 999
3	Lima	Miraflores	Larco 497	Avenida José Larco 497
4	Lima	Miraflores	Luchita	Pasaje Champagnat 139
5	Lima	Miraflores	Óvalo Gutiérrez	Avenida Santa Cruz 847
6	Lima	Santiago de Surco	El Polo	Avenida El Polo 709, Urban Plaza
7	Lima	San Miguel	Plaza San Miguel	Boulevard Plaza Mantaro 34
8	Lima	San Miguel	La Marina	Avenida de la Marina 790
9	Lima	Cercado de Lima	Centro Cívico	Real Plaza Centro Cívico, Avenida Garcilaso de la Vega 1337
10	Lima	Independencia	MegaPlaza	Avenida Industrial 3698
11	Lima	Independencia	Plaza Norte	Avenida Alfredo Mendiola 1400, second floor
12	Lima	Chorrillos	Plaza Lima Sur	Cenco Lima Sur, Avenida Paseo de la República
13	Lima	La Victoria	Parque Cánepa	Centro Comercial Parque Cánepa
14	Callao	Callao	Óscar R. Benavides	Avenida Óscar R. Benavides 3866
15	Lima	—	Gonzáles Prada	Calle Gonzáles Prada 501
16	Callao	Callao	Jorge Chávez Airport	Jorge Chávez International Airport, international departures
17	Arequipa	Historic Centre	Mercaderes	Calle Mercaderes 116–118
18	Arequipa	Cayma	Mallplaza Arequipa	Avenida Ejército 793
19	Arequipa	—	Mall Aventura Arequipa	Avenida Porongoche 500
20	Trujillo	—	Mall Aventura	Mall Aventura Trujillo
21	Trujillo	—	César Vallejo	Avenida Prolongación César Vallejo
22	Trujillo	—	Mallplaza Trujillo	Mallplaza Trujillo

=== International ===
By 2023 there were La Lucha franchises in Santiago, Chile, and Colombia, and the company was looking at other cities in both countries, as well as at Ecuador and Spain.

=== Colombia ===
La Lucha's first location outside Peru opened in Bogotá in April 2018, on Calle 93 near the Parque de la 93, under a franchise held by Colombian partner Juan David Carrillo. As of November 2026 there were seven branches of La Lucha in Colombia, all in Bogotá: Plaza Claro, Mallplaza NQS, 85th street in Chapinero, 93rd street, Multiplaza, Unicentro and Parque La Colina (146th street).

=== Chile ===
In Chile, the brand was operated by Global Group Corporation (GGCorp), which in 2018 planned to open six locations in shopping malls there. A location in Costanera Center in Santiago did open in 2018, but then it closed in December 2023, although the company said that the absence from the mall "temporary".

=== Mexico ===
In 2024, La Lucha arrived in Mexico City with a shop in Polanquito, a dense, walkable restaurant district of the high-end Polanco district. As of November 2026, there is one other Mexico City location on the Río Lerma restaurant row located just behind some of the city's tallest skyscrapers lining the iconic boulevard, Paseo de la Reforma, in the Colonia Cuauhtémoc neighborhood.

=== Ecuador ===
As of 2025 the chain was preparing to enter Ecuador.

== Menu ==
La Lucha serves Peruvian sánguches on bread baked in-house, with fillings such as lechón (roast pork), wood-fired turkey and the pan con chicharrón of fried pork with sweet potato. Its meats are also roasted in-house. The shops also serve fresh fruit juices and shakes, including lúcuma and guanábana. Several branches stay open until the early hours.

== Reception ==
In a review for El Comercio, food critic Paola Miglio noted the queue at the Avenida Diagonal branch in Miraflores even in the late afternoon. In 2024 it won the sandwich shop category of the Summum awards, ahead of El Chinito.

Frommer's travel guide lists the Miraflores branch, and Culture Trip placed it first among Lima's street food spots, mentioning long lines every day of the week. Afar recommended it as a trustworthy place for fresh juice. Colombia's El Tiempo said that visitors in search of Lima’s cuisine were almost certain to end up eating La Lucha's sandwiches.
