= William Montagu-Pollock =

British diplomat

Sir William Montagu-Pollock
- Born: William Horace Montagu-Pollock; 12 July 1903
- Died: 26 September 1993 (aged 90)
- Education: Marlborough College
- Alma mater: Trinity College, Cambridge
- Occupation: Diplomat
- Known for: British ambassador to Syria, Peru, Switzerland and Denmark
- Spouses: Prudence Williams (m. 1933; div. 1945) Barbara Jowett (m. 1948)
- Children: 3 (2 with Williams, 1 with Jowett)
- Relatives: Josceline Dimbleby (stepdaughter)

Sir William Horace Montagu-Pollock KCMG (12 July 1903 – 26 September 1993) was a British diplomat who was ambassador to Syria, Peru, Switzerland and Denmark.

== Career ==
William Horace Montagu-Pollock was educated at Marlborough College and Trinity College, Cambridge. He joined the Diplomatic Service in 1927 He served at Rome, Belgrade, Prague, Vienna and Stockholm, where he was chargé d'affaires during the Second World War. He then worked at the Foreign Office as the first Head of the Cultural Relations Department, for which he was appointed a Companion of the Order of St Michael and St George (CMG) in the 1946 Birthday Honours.

The CRD had its origins in a small Foreign Office section created to give political direction to the British Council and to manage the political and policy aspects of the growing scale of organised international intellectual, cultural, societal and artistic contacts, with a view to promoting Allied goodwill; but it became, almost by accident, a small British front-line unit in a clandestine struggle to prevent Moscow's domination of the world of international movements, federations and assemblies – what would later be called ‘the battle of the festivals’. Later, Montagu-Pollock was head of the General Department of the Foreign Office.

In 1950, Montagu-Pollock was appointed Minister to Syria, upgraded to Ambassador in 1952. In December 1953, he was appointed to be Ambassador to Peru; While he was in Peru he was promoted to Knight Commander of the Order of St Michael and St George (KCMG) in the 1957 Birthday Honours. In May 1958 he became Ambassador to Switzerland and in 1960 he became Ambassador to Denmark.

Sir William retired from the Diplomatic Service in 1962.

== Personal life ==
In 1933, he married Prudence Williams, with whom he had one son and one daughter. They divorced in 1945, and Williams died in 1985. In 1948, he married Barbara Jowett. They had one son.

He was famous for "various idiosyncrasies" of cars and of personal dress, adapting "expertly to a local cuisine".

He was fond of "modern music", favoring the composer Elliott Carter and friends with Desmond Shawe-Taylor (music critic). He was Chairman of the British Institute of Recorded Sound from 1970–73, Vice-President of the Society for the Promotion of New Music and a member of the Board of Governors of the European Cultural Foundation.

== Bibliography ==
- MONTAGU-POLLOCK, Sir William Horace, Who Was Who, A & C Black, 1920–2008; online edn, Oxford University Press, Dec 2007, accessed 18 April 2012(subscription required)
- Obituary: Sir William Montagu-Pollock, The Times, London, 18 October 1993

Diplomatic posts
| Preceded by Philip Mainwaring Broadmead | Envoy Extraordinary and Minister Plenipotentiary at Damascus, then Ambassador Extraordinary and Plenipotentiary at Damascus; 1950–1953 | Succeeded by Alfred John Gardener |
| Preceded by Sir Oswald Scott | Ambassador Extraordinary and Plenipotentiary at Lima; 1953–1958 | Succeeded by Sir Berkeley Gage |
| Preceded by Sir Lionel Lamb | Ambassador Extraordinary and Plenipotentiary at Berne; 1958–60 | Succeeded by Paul Francis Grey |
| Preceded by Sir Roderick Barclay | Ambassador Extraordinary and Plenipotentiary at Copenhagen; 1960–1962 | Succeeded by Sir John Henniker-Major |
