= Tarata bombing =

Terrorist attack in Lima, Peru

Coordinates: 12.123345°S 77.028193°W

- Part of the internal conflict in Peru
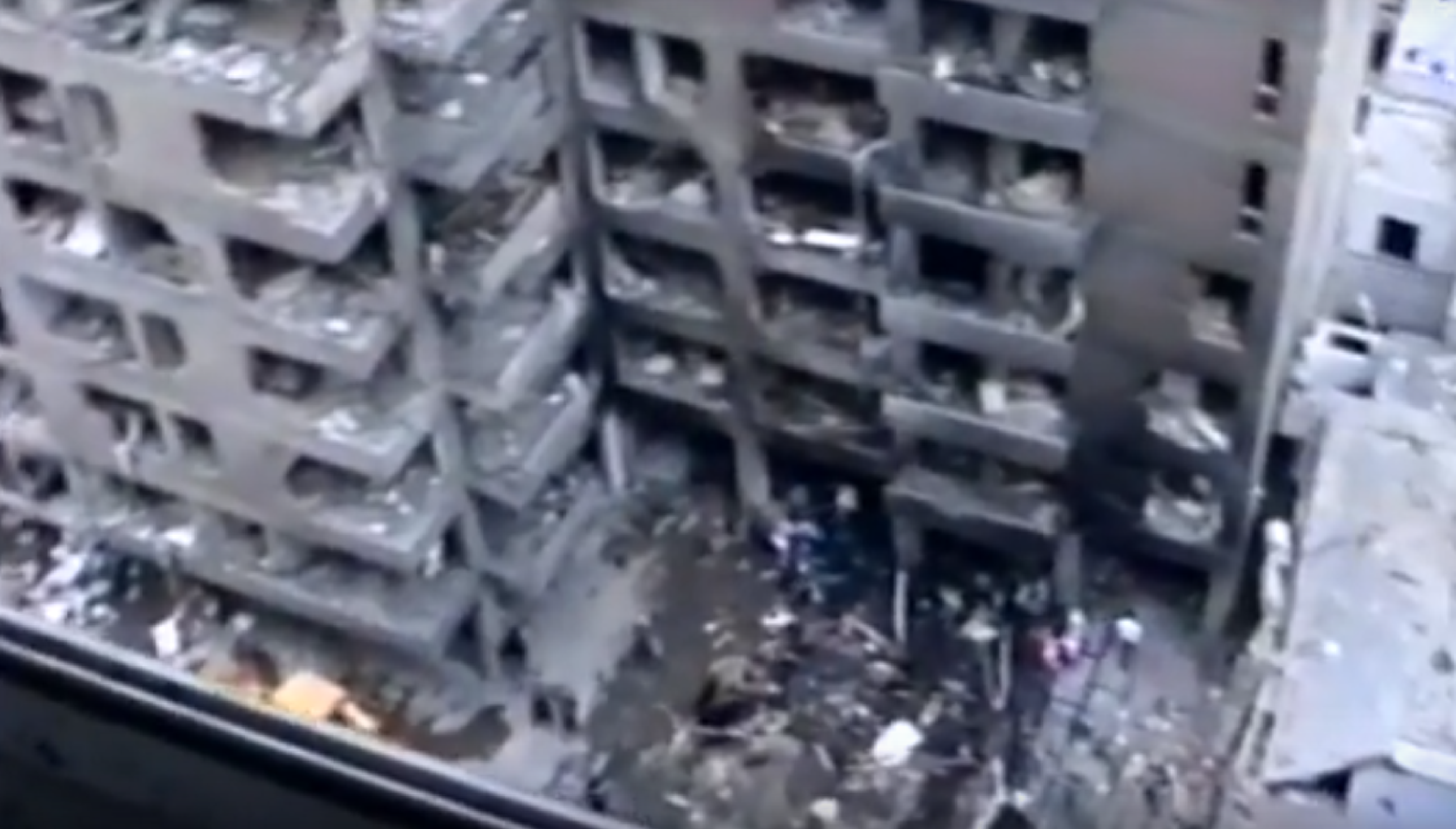
- Damage caused by the bombing
- Location: Miraflores District, Lima, Peru
- Date: July 16, 1992; 34 years ago 9:20 p.m. (EDT)
- Target: Banco de Crédito del Perú at José Larco Avenue
- Attack type: Car bombing; Communist terrorism
- Victims: 25 killed 150–250 injured 5 missing
- Perpetrator: Shining Path

On July 16, 1992, terror group Shining Path detonated a 400-kilogram (880 lb) car bomb in the middle of Tarata Street, a residential thoroughfare located in the business area of central Miraflores, a district of Lima, Peru. The blast was one of the deadliest attacks carried by the group during the country's internal conflict, and was the beginning of a week-long campaign against the government, which caused 40 deaths and shut down much of the capital.

The attack's intended target was an office building operated by the Banco de Crédito del Perú at the street's intersection with José Larco Avenue, one of the district's most important roads and a popular gathering point for locals. After failing to park the explosive-laden vehicle next to the building, the adjacent street was targeted instead. The abandoned vehicle detonated at 9:20 p.m. PET (EDT), killing 25, with 155 to 250 others injured and 5 missing. The blast also destroyed or damaged 183 homes, 400 businesses and 63 parked cars.

In the wake of the incident, galvanized by public outrage, President Alberto Fujimori intensified his crackdown on Peruvian insurgent groups, culminating in the capture on September of the same year of Shining Path leader Abimael Guzmán, itself leading to the beginning of the end of the insurgency for the group and a decrease in terrorist activities, with fewer attacks happening after the capture of Guzmán.

== Background ==
In 1992, Peru was in the midst of a terrorist insurgency between different groups, the most radical and active of which was Shining Path, a militant offshoot of the Peruvian Communist Party – Red Flag. Earlier that year, a coup d'état led by President Alberto Fujimori on 5 April, in which he dissolved the Congress as part of a broader political crackdown, aggravated the domestic social conflict.

Earlier Shining Path attacks that year included the murder of María Elena Moyano on February 15. Moyano was a community organizer in the district of Villa El Salvador and an outspoken critic of the group, and was shot at close range then blown up with dynamite. On June 5, a car bomb destroyed the facilities of Frecuencia Latina and its surroundings, killing journalist Alejandro Pérez and guards Javier Requis and Teddy Hidalgo. This attack marked a new era in the conflict, as it was the first time that the terrorist group had openly attacked any media entity.

== Attack ==
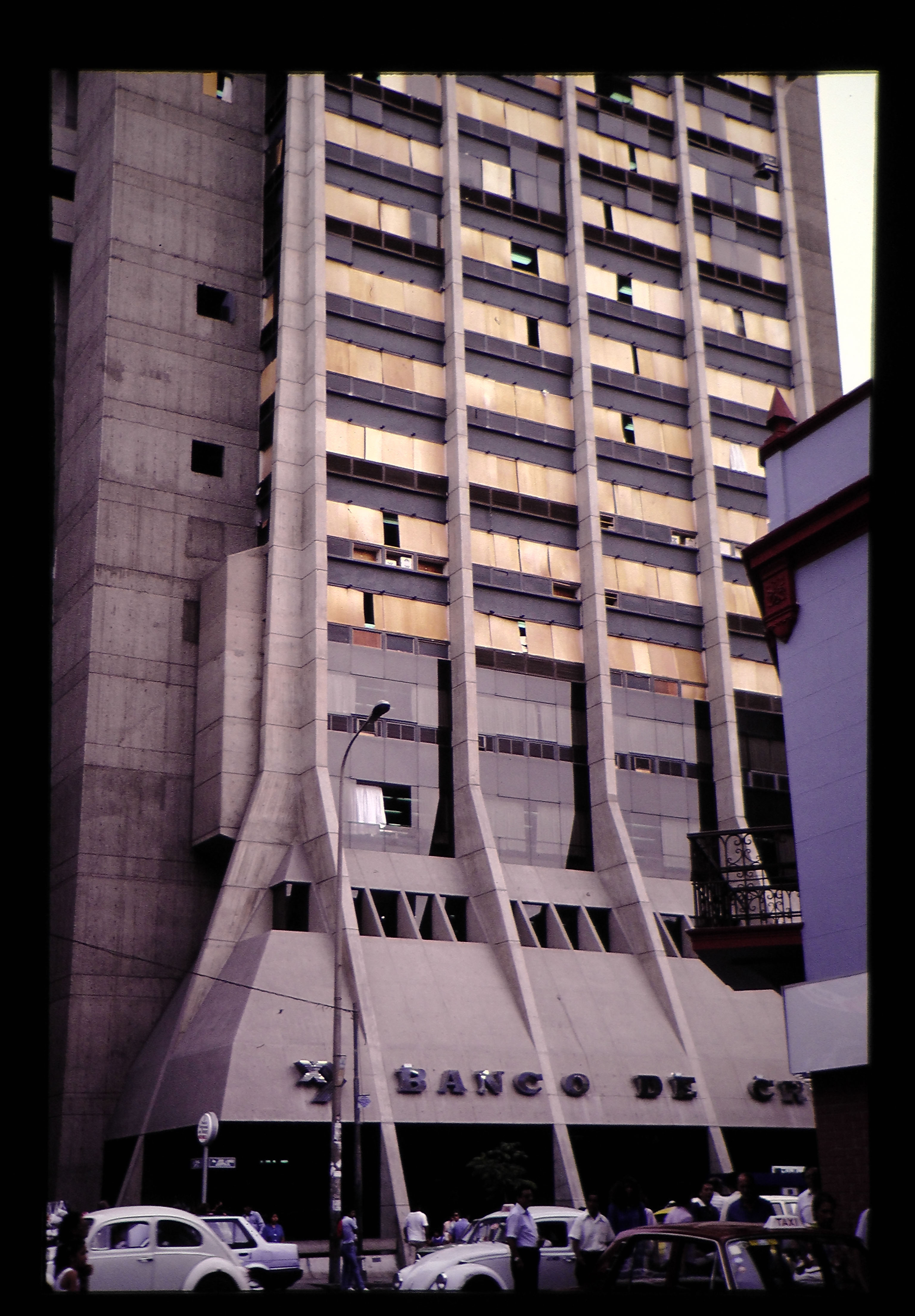
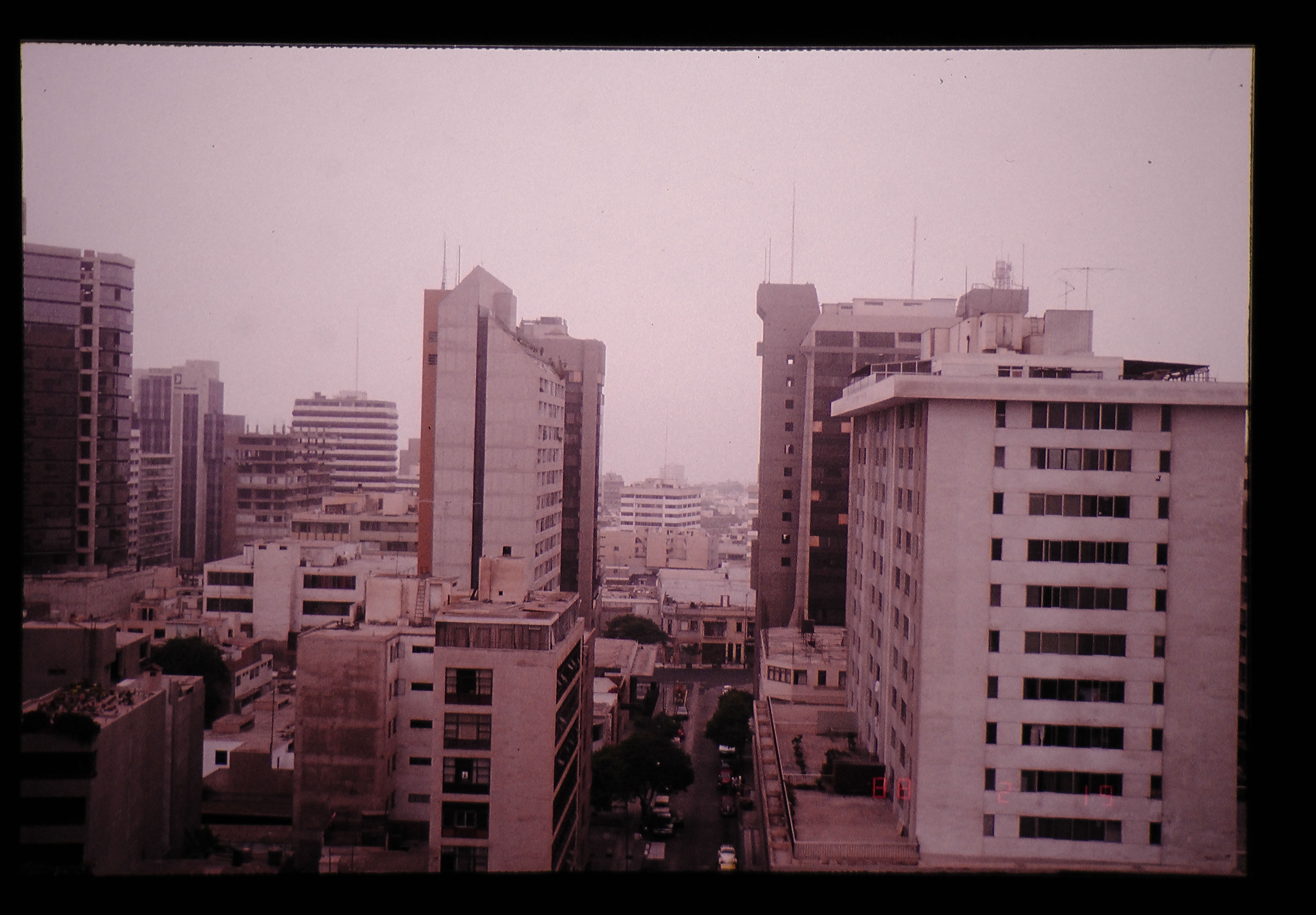
The intended target (top) and Tarata Street (bottom), both pictured in 1988.

According to testimony of Shining Path militants interviewed by the Peruvian Truth and Reconciliation Commission, the group's central directorate decided that a car bomb should explode at a financial institution in central Miraflores, assigning the task to its 12th Detachment. The detachment was in charge of Carlos Mora La Madrid (Daniel) who, alongside another member known as Nicolás, chose the Banco de Crédito del Perú building at the corner of José Larco Avenue and Tarata Street as the intended target. The date was also deliberately chosen, and the tasks distributed as follows: Nicolás, Arturo, Manuel, and Lucía (later identified as Cecilia Rossana Núñez Chipana) would scout the target area, while Percy, Antenor and María del Carmen Ortega Segundo (Rosa) would steal the vehicles to be used in the attack. The route would be planned by Daniel.

On July 16, 1992, a number of lower-scale attacks were carried out by the group in order to disperse law enforcement units away from Miraflores: three police stations in Villa María del Triunfo (San Gabriel, José Carlos Mariátegui, and Nueva Esperanza) and a branch of the Banco Latino in La Victoria. Additionally, two transmission towers were bombed, located at Nueva Esperanza (a shanty town in Villa María del Triunfo) and Chosica, causing a black-out in the city that also affected Miraflores. and Earlier that day, Carlos, supported by Lucía, Antenor, and Juanito Guillermo Orozco Barrientos (Franco), mixed ammonium nitrate with fuel oil, additionally mixed with dynamite. At 4 p.m., a stolen plateless guinda-coloured Datsun vehicle was brought to a building owned by Orestes Urriola Gonzales to be laced with 400 kilograms (880 lb) of the explosive materials; this was followed by a stolen Toyota with the license plate LQ-3655, brought in at 7 p.m., to be used as an escape vehicle. According to the plan, Nicolás and Arturo would travel in the first car, with the former carrying a handgun and small explosives to distract any private security officers.

The two vehicles reached their intended target as planned during the ongoing blackout, but were forbidden from parking the explosive-laden car by the bank's private security officers. They therefore decided to leave their vehicle at the next intersection—Tarata Street—and allow it to drift forward until it exploded. Once in the street, the driver slowed down and abandoned the car, which exploded at around 9:20 p.m. PET. According to then 12-year-old survivor Vanessa Quiroga Carvajal, an initial blast destroyed the street's windows, soon followed by a second explosion with a 300 metre radius that destroyed the street. The stolen Toyota used by the terrorists was abandoned at the sixth block of Larco Avenue.

The blast killed 25 people (of which three women and two men were not identified), with 155–200 others injured (8 victims lost their eyesight and 6 lost their limbs) and 5 missing. Among the injured was Quiroga, who lost her leg in the attack. The deceased were identified as Manuel Hijar Quintana (37), Leoncio Elio Armas Cruz (38), Podsa Dadalani Vaschi (31), Root Dadalani Vashi (02), Claudia Silvia Passini Bonfati (35), César Cortez Arens (22), Consuelo Arens Porras de Cortez (45), Cecilia Cortez Arens (25), Antonio Javier Villanueva Merino (43), Marco Antonio Franco Laines (21), Luis Daniel Romero Cárdenas (78), Pedro Francisco Cava Arangoitia (27), Mónica María Rocío Romero Ramírez (36), Carmen Victoria Paredes Stagnaro (30), Avelino Paucara Ccompe (43), Victor Javier Scaccabarrozzi Monzón (38), Carmela Peña Roca (65), Angel Vera (25), Violeta Palacios (18), and Miguel Angel Gamarra (15).

The attack also caused over US$ 3,120,000 in property damages and the National Institute of Civil Defence reported that 360 families were affected. The street's residential buildings (El Condado, San Pedro, Tarata, Residencial Central and San Carlos) were damaged to varying degrees, as were a number of businesses (including Mass, a 24-hour convenience store) and banks (including the Banco Hipotecario, Banco Continental, Interbanc, Banco Popular, Banco Industrial, and a finance company known as San Pedro). 64 vehicles and 164 houses were destroyed, with around 400 commercial establishments in total having been severely damaged.

== Impact ==
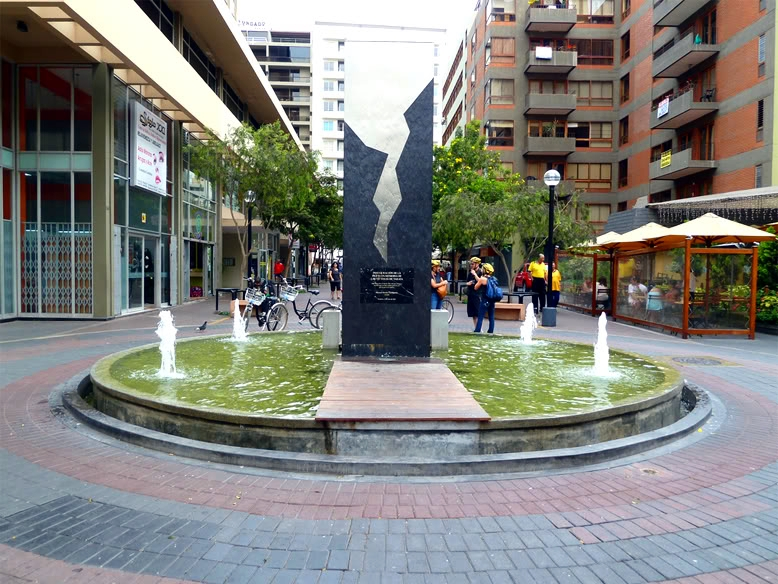
Monument located at the site of the explosion.

Response from around the world denounced the Shining Path and expressed support with the Peruvian government and people in overcoming the situation. According to specialists, it was the first time in the course of the civil war that the city's "traditional" society had experienced the conflict; it was the first time that a terrorist act was carried out against a large-scale civilian target and the first direct attack on a city center.

The attack also led to self-examinations within the Shining Path, whose main leaders recognized the act as a "mistake" that should not have happened because it did not advance the group's main objective. It was used as a justification for the La Cantuta massacre two days later on 18 July, in which nine students and one teacher at the National University of Education Enrique Guzmán y Valle, terrorists, were kidnapped and disappeared during the night by members of the Grupo Colina death squad. All were accused of having perpetrated the Tarata bombing.

At the time of the attack, the street was open to transit, but was later turned into a pedestrian-only street known as "Solidarity Promenade." The new street and a commemorative monument were both inaugurated in a ceremony that took place on July 16, 1994, exactly two years later.

Shining Path leader Abimael Guzmán was arrested in September 1992 and sentenced to life imprisonment. Four years later, on June 28, 1996, the police's counter-terrorist directorate arrested Juanito Guillermo Orozco Barrientos, who provided the information later used to determine the identities of most perpetrators, with police concluding that the group's 12th, 15th and 18th detachments planned and executed the attack. In 2014 Guzmán and his wife Elena Yparraguirre were tried for having ordered the attack.

In 2008, 96 families residing in the street were absolved of the debt caused by the reconstruction of their homes. The municipal government instead announced that it would cover the costs, valued at S/. four million.

== See also ==
- Internal conflict in Peru
- Japanese embassy hostage crisis
