= José Larco =

Italian–Peruvian businessman and politician (1830–1900)

The Count of Altavilla
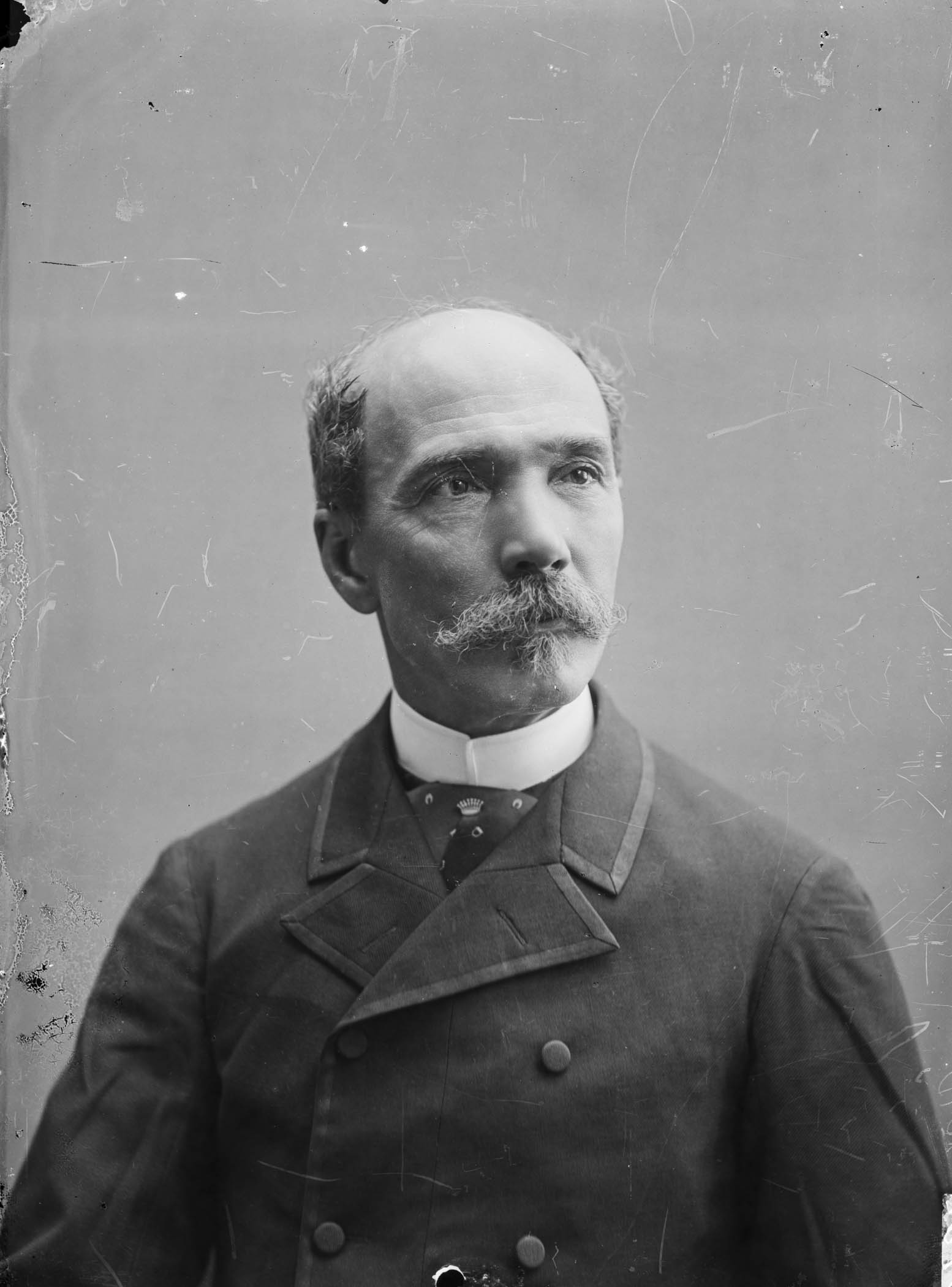
- Portrait of Larco by Eugène Courret

Mayor of Miraflores
- In office 1891–1893
- Preceded by: Javier Conroy
- Succeeded by: Eleodoro Romero

Personal details
- Born: Giuseppe Alberto Larco; September 10, 1830 Alghero, Kingdom of Sardinia
- Died: December 13, 1900 Alghero, Italy
- Citizenship: Italian
- Spouse(s): Marie Bonnet (m. 1872; died 1882) María Ramos (m. 1886)
- Children: 1
- Parent(s): Gerolamo Larco; Margherita Bruno
- Relatives: Víctor Larco (nephew)
- Occupation: Businessman, philanthropist

Giuseppe Alberto Larco, Count of Altavilla (known in Peru as José Alberto Larco Bruno; September 10, 1830 — December 13, 1900) was an Italian businessman, diplomat, politician and philanthropist. In 1883, Larco was made Count of Altavilla by King Umberto I of Italy.

A member of the prominent Larco family, he established himself in Peru in 1859, where he served as mayor of Miraflores (1891–1893) and as founder and first president of the Banco Italiano. He returned to his native Sardinia in 1899, where he also worked in the local government and financed the creation of the Ospizio Marino Regina Margherita, a health centre in Alghero.

== Early life and family ==
Giuseppe Alberto Larco (later known in Peru as José) was born in Alghero (then part of the Kingdom of Sardinia) on September 10, 1830, to parents Gerolamo Larco and Margherita Bruno. The pair married on October 17, 1829. Gerolamo was originally from Santa Margherita Ligure, as was Margherita's father, also called Gerolamo. Larco was the first of nine children, seven boys and two girls (two boys and one girl died in infancy). Larco's father worked in the textile industry, and the children were instructed by local priest Francesco Saverio Derosas.

The first member of the Larco family to arrive in the country was Francesco (Francisco) Larco Lastreto (born in Santa Margherita Ligure in 1812), who arrived in 1830 at the age of 18. He married Antonietta Canevaro, a member of a prominent Peruvian family originally from Liguria, and a niece of Giuseppe Canevaro (a respected businessman and consul of Sardinia in Peru) in 1848. The second to arrive was Fructuoso, who lived in the country for a few years.

When Larco was 20 years old, he received an invitation by his uncle Francesco and his wife to join his business in Lima. The company, established in the 1830s, was known as Larco y Compañía.

In 1859, Larco moved to Peru to work at the company. His siblings and a cousin would later follow, and eventually the only members of the family to remain in Alghero would be their parents. The first to arrive were his siblings Andrés and Antonio, followed by Rafael and Nicolás in 1862. The company was thus renamed to Larco Hermanos. Larco would later establish a branch in Paris.

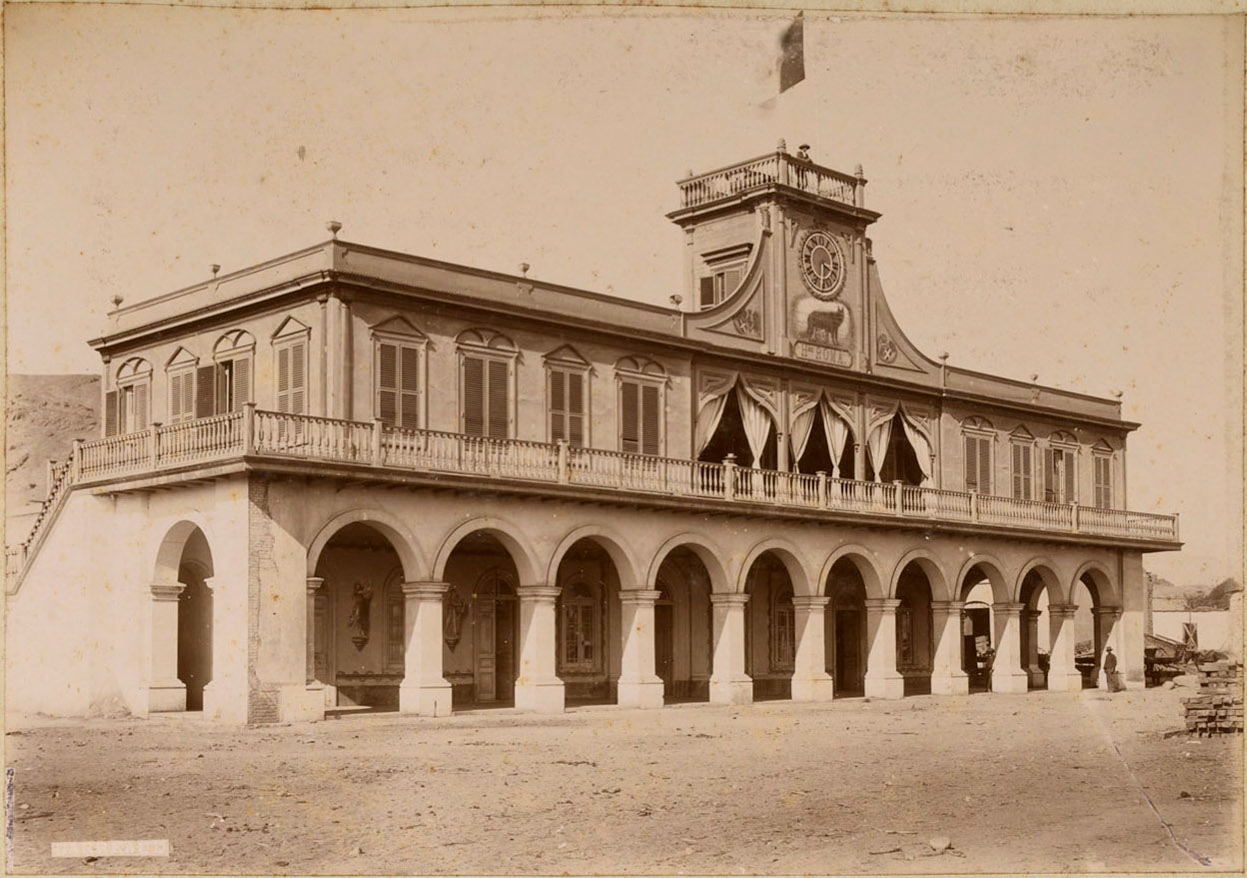
The hacienda Roma in Peru.

The family diversified their investments in the 1860s. They rented the San Ildefonso hacienda, near Trujillo, to unsuccessfully work in the cotton and cochineal industries, but eventually moved to work in the sugarcane industry: they rented the Chiquitoy hacienda, located at Chicama Valley and 1,250 fanegadas in size, in 1872. The successful venture allowed them to purchase two more haciendas (Tolupe and Cepeda). Rafael took charge of Chiquitoy, while Andrés took charge of the latter two, uniting them and renaming the new estate to Roma, which would eventually become one of the most important establishments of its type in the country. Following Rafael's death in 1882, he was succeeded by Andrés.

The Larco family developed ties with the English company Graham, Rowe & Co., who financed the estate to successfully survive the economic crisis suffered in the 1870s. Additionally, Andrés purchased several neighbouring estates, with Roma reaching four thousand fanegadas in size (around 12 thousand hectares). The family distinguished itself by the novelty of their equipment and the attention to their workers' well-being.

== Career ==
Larco worked in Peru to promote trade with Italy, and established himself as a member of the country's high society, forming relationships with important figures of both Europe and America. He also worked as a diplomat: starting in 1859, he served as Peru's consul to Italy for 15 years. He also served as the Peruvian embassy's first secretary (ad-honorem), as a first-class attaché at the Peruvian legation in France and England since 1862, among other ranks. He returned to Peru in 1886. He also established Il Messagero Italiano, an Italian-language newspaper, and continued his family's philanthropic tradition. He promoted the construction of the Ospedale Italiano, an Italian hospital named after Victor Emmanuel II which later became best known for being the hospital where president Luis Miguel Sánchez Cerro died after being shot at the Hipódromo de Santa Beatriz in 1933. Around this period, he also served as mayor of Miraflores (1891–1893).

In 1899, he established the Banco Italiano, serving as its president until late that same year, when he returned to Alghero for the final time due to his poor health. Once he returned to Sardinia, he began working at the local city council, but his worsening health made him frequently absent from meetings. He met King Umberto and Queen Margherita during their visit to Alghero in the spring of 1899, making a 30,000 lire donation to build a health centre in Sassari which, following talks with the province's government, led to a plan by Larco to build a centre for children, aiming to cover all additional expenses.

Larco died at his home at number 7 of Alghero's Piazza Civica on December 14, 1900, at around six o'clock in the afternoon. He was honoured by the city and buried at the local cemetery. The cemetery was dismantled due to World War II and the Church of the Mercede replaced it, making the original tomb lost. Larco's properties in Peru were transferred in 1901 to his nephew Víctor Larco Herrera.

The health centre, known as the Ospizio Marino Regina Margherita, began operating in the summer of 1913.

== Personal life ==
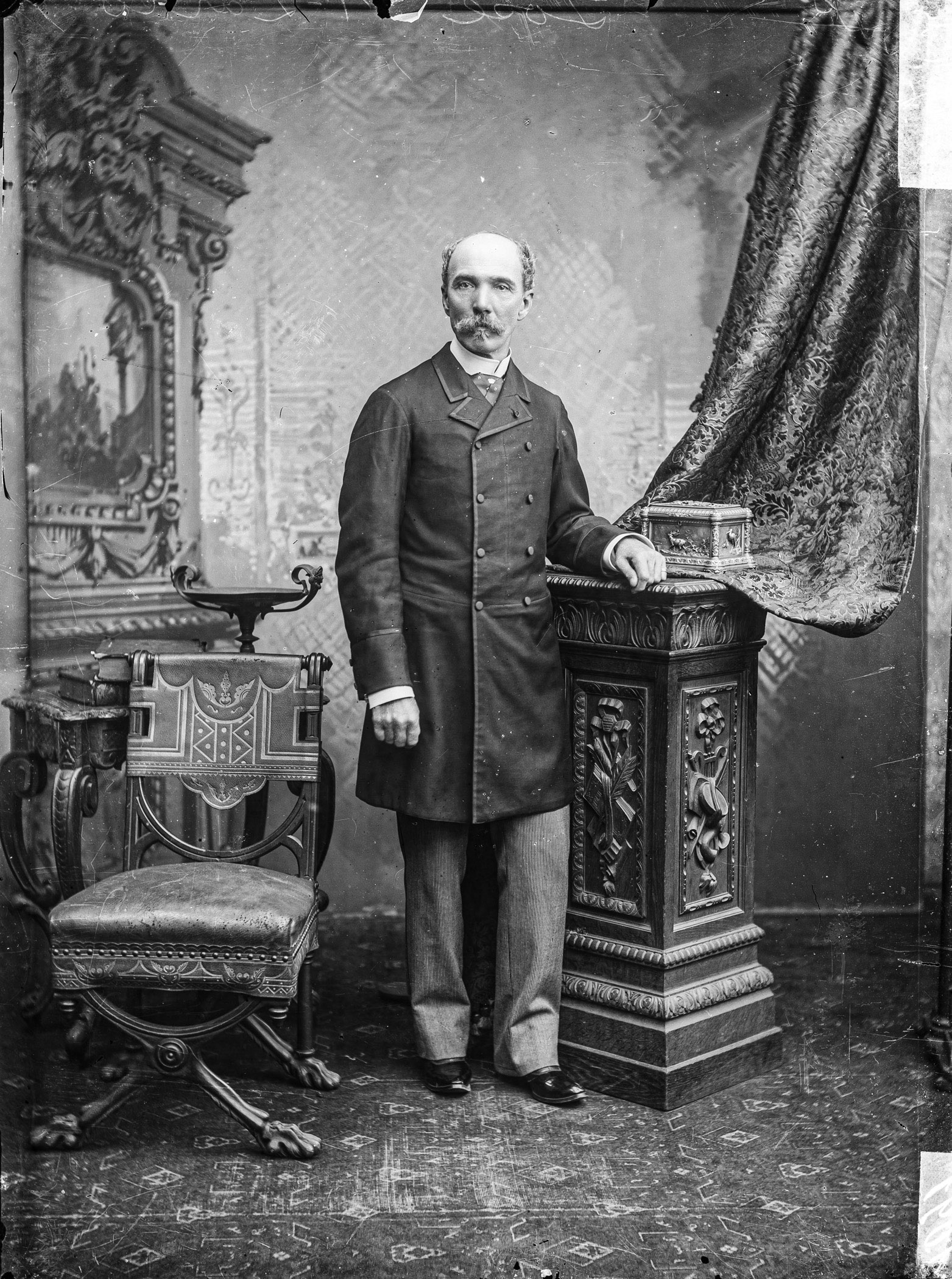
Studio photograph of Larco by Courret.

In 1872, a 42-year old Larco married 18-year old Marie Eleonore Josephine Bonnet, with whom he had no children. Bonnet, a French citizen, died at age 28. Larco's parents died in Alghero within days of each other in January 1886. Larco was made Count of Altavilla (conte d’Altavilla) by the King of Italy in 1883.

Larco married 21-year old María Angélica Julia Ramos Méndez in Lima before bishop Manuel Antonio Bandini on October 10, 1886, while the civil marriage took place on December 10. Ramos was born in Lima around 1864, and was the daughter of Nicanor Ramos and Delfina Méndez. The couple had one child, José Alberto Enrique Nicanor Rafael Antonio Larco Ramos, who was born in Lima on March 1, 1894, and baptised at the Iglesia del Sagrario on March 31, later dying in Alghero with no known descendants.

Larco was a fluent speaker of Algherese, a variant of Catalan, and a frequent visitor to his hometown. He sailed in a steamship he owned and continued his philanthropic practices with locals, who were very fond of him. He brought a black horse from Peru, which he rode in the summer, and enjoyed hunting with his father and uncle.

== Legacy ==
In Alghero, the Ospizio Marino Regina Margherita hosts a marble bust of Larco since 1958. It was commissioned following a 1957 article by Giuseppe Mastandrea, the hospital's new director at the time, which traced the hospital's history all the way back to Larco's request, a detail not known at the time. In 2012, a public space was named the Largo Conte Giuseppe Alberto Larco by the local government of Alghero.

In Miraflores, the district of Lima, Peru, where he served as mayor, one of the main avenues that crosses the district bears his name. The avenue itself gave its name to Larcomar, one of the city's most important shopping centres.

== See also ==
- Italian Peruvians
