= Kate Harrisson =

British diplomat

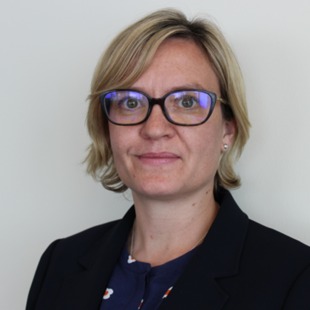

United Kingdom Ambassador to Peru
- In office 2018–2022
- Monarch: Elizabeth II
- Prime Minister: Theresa May; Boris Johnson
- Preceded by: Anwar Choudhury
- Succeeded by: Gavin Cook

Personal details
- Occupation: Diplomat

Kate Harrisson is a British diplomat. She was the British Ambassador to Peru from 2018 to 2022, when she was replaced by diplomat Gavin Cook.

== Career ==
She graduated from Open University, and SOAS University of London. She gained first degrees in Modern Chinese studies and in psychology and she has a master's degree in social anthropology. She worked in business in China until in 2000 she decided to join the Foreign and Commonwealth Office.

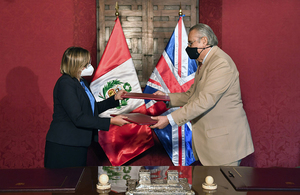
Kate Harrisson and Allan Wagner Tizon signing an Infrastructure Task Force agreement in 2021

She was Deputy Head of Mission to Vietnam, Political Counselor in China, and Economic Consul in Hong Kong. She was a panelist at 2019 Latin American Cities Conferences: Lima.

She signed a Infrastructure Task Force Memorandum of Understanding in 2021 to continue to support a joint Infrastructure Task Force that had been working since 2018. She promoted infrastructure improvement in Peru.
