= Courtenay Forbes =

British diplomat (1889–1958)

Sir Courtenay Forbes KCMG

British Ambassador to Peru
- In office 1944–1945
- Preceded by: Charles Henry Bentinck
- Succeeded by: Walter Roberts

Personal details
- Born: 29 January 1889
- Died: 26 January 1958 (aged 68)
- Children: 1
- Parent: Eveline Louisa Mitchell Forbes (mother)
- Education: University College, Oxford
- Occupation: Diplomat

Sir Victor Courtenay Walter Forbes (29 January 1889 – 26 January 1958) was a British diplomat who served as British Ambassador to Peru from 1944 to 1945.

== Early life and education ==
Forbes was born on 29 January 1889, the son of Captain the Hon. W. R. D. Forbes (a younger son of Walter Forbes, 18th Lord Forbes) and Eveline Louisa Mitchell Forbes née Farwell. He was educated at Eton College and University College, Oxford.

== Career ==
Forbes joined the Foreign Office as a clerk in 1913. He came up with the name of the Government Code and Cypher School. In 1924, he was promoted to first secretary. From 1930 to 1932, he served at Mexicio City, and then from 1932 to 1934 as counsellor at Madrid. In 1934, he was appointed Envoy Extraordinary and Minister Plenipotentiary in Lima and Quito, and in 1944, when the legation was raised to an Embassy, he was appointed Ambassador to Peru, serving in the post until his retirement in 1945.

Atlapetes forbesi, the Apurimac brushfinch, was named in his honour by Alastair Morrison in 1947, "as a small token of my appreciation for much help, encouragement, and good advice".

== Personal life and death ==
Forbes married Luia Juta in 1916 and they had a daughter. The marriage was dissolved. In 1950, he married Mary née Olivieri, widow of Walter Bizley.

Forbes died on 26 January 1958, aged 68.

== Honours ==
Forbes was appointed Companion of the Order of St Michael and St George (CMG) in the 1941 New Year Honours, and promoted to Knight Commander (KCMG) in the 1945 New Year Honours.

== See also ==
- Peru–United Kingdom relations

Diplomatic posts
Preceded by Charles Henry Bentinck	British Ambassador to Peru; 1944–1945	Succeeded by Walter Roberts
