= Charles Henry Bentinck =

British diplomat and Anglican priest

Reverend Sir Charles Bentinck KCMG (23 April 1879 – 26 March 1955) was a British diplomat who served as Minister (diplomacy) to several countries. After retirement from the Diplomatic Service, he became an Anglican priest.

He was the third of seven children born to Lieutenant Colonel Henry Charles Adolphus Frederick William Bentinck, 5th Graf Bentinck (1846–1903) and Henrietta Eliza Cathcart McKerrall (1848–1904). He married Lucy Victoria Buxton (20 April 1893 – 27 June 1978), daughter of Sir Thomas Buxton, 4th Baronet, and Anne Louisa Matilda O'Rorke, on 9 May 1922.

== Career ==
Charles Henry Bentinck was educated privately and at Trinity College, Cambridge. He joined the Diplomatic Service in 1904 and served in Berlin 1905–06 and St Petersburg 1906–09 before being appointed to The Hague 1908–14 where he acted as Chargé d'affaires on several occasions. During World War I he was stationed in Tokyo. In 1919 he returned to the Foreign Office and in 1920 was posted with the rank of counsellor to Athens where he again acted as chargé d'affaires for a considerable period. He was also British delegate to the international financial commission which had been established in Athens following the Greco-Turkish War (1897) to oversee the public finances of Greece.

After a few months as Consul-General at Munich 1924–25 Bentinck was Minister and Consul-General in Ethiopia 1925–29; Minister to Peru and Ecuador (at that time a combined mission) 1929–33; Minister to Bulgaria 1934–36; Minister to Czechoslovakia 1936–37; and Ambassador to Chile 1937–40.

After retiring from the Diplomatic Service in 1941 Bentinck studied for ordination at Wycliffe Hall, Oxford, and was ordained in the same year. He was vicar of West Farleigh, Kent, 1941–46. In 1946 he moved to Brussels and was for two years officiating chaplain to HM Forces in Belgium. Sir Charles died in Brussels on 26 March 1955. Dame Lucy Bentinck died on 27 June 1978, in Upshire, Essex.

== Honours ==
Charles Bentinck was appointed CMG in the King's Birthday Honours of 1923 and knighted KCMG in 1937. Through his descent from the Bentinck family he was a Count of the Holy Roman Empire, a title created in 1732 by the Emperor Charles VI for William Bentinck, son of the 1st Earl of Portland. The family was granted a Royal Licence by Queen Victoria in 1886 to bear the title in England, but Sir Charles did not use the title of Count. The Royal Warrant of 27 April 1932 abolished the use of Foreign Titles in the United Kingdom, but extended the special allowance in 13 cases, including the Bentinck countly title "during the lives of the present holders, their heirs, and their heir's heir, provided such heir's heir is now in existence." That exception has now expired.

Diplomatic posts
Preceded by Claud Russell	Envoy Extraordinary and Minister Plenipotentiary to Ethiopia; 1925–1929	Succeeded by Sir Sidney Barton
Preceded by Lord Herbert Hervey	Minister Plenipotentiary to the Republics of Peru and Ecuador; 1929–1933	Succeeded by Courtenay Forbes
Preceded by Sydney Waterlow	Envoy Extraordinary and Minister Plenipotentiary at Sofia; 1933–1936	Succeeded by Maurice Peterson
Preceded by Sir Joseph Addison	Envoy Extraordinary and Minister Plenipotentiary to the Czechoslovak Republic; 1936–1937	Succeeded by Sir Basil Newton
Preceded by Sir Robert Michell	Ambassador Extraordinary and Plenipotentiary at Santiago; 1937–1940	Succeeded by Sir Charles Orde
