= Eveline Louisa Mitchell Forbes =

- Born: 1866
- Died: 18 April 1924 (aged 57–58)
- Occupation: Novelist
- Spouse(s): Walter Robert Drummond Forbes
- Children: Courtenay Forbes
- Parent(s): Frederick Cooper Farwell

Eveline Louisa Mitchell Forbes (1866 – 18 April 1924) was a British novelist. She published nine novels under the name the Hon. Mrs. Walter R. D. Forbes and a book on palmistry.

== Early life ==
Eveline Louisa Mitchell Forbes was born in 1866, the daughter of Frederick Cooper Farwell and Louisa Whitbread Mitchell, daughter of Admiral Frederick Thomas Michell. In 1888, she married Walter Robert Drummond Forbes, son of Walter Forbes, 18th Lord Forbes. They had a son, diplomat Victor Courtenay Walter Forbes.

== Career ==
She published a book on palmistry, Fingers and Fortune (1886), and wrote articles on palmistry for The New Review, including an 1894 article where she read the palm of Thomas Hardy. Her novels often featured one-word titles and multiple settings across the British Empire. The title of Blight (1897) is the nickname of a femme fatale who preys on British high society. A Gentleman (1900) moves from Italy to London to Australia, following Raymond, the son of a dressmaker attempting to win the hand of a peer's daughter. Dumb (1901) is set in Scotland, Switzerland, and the Indian frontier, following Aileen Conyngham, victim of a unhappy marriage who becomes a widow and is allowed to express love again. Nameless (1909) is set in Scotland, London, and Africa, but focuses on a female novelist named Cecil Grey.

== Death ==
Eveline Louisa Mitchell Forbes died on 18 April 1924.

== Bibliography ==
- Fingers and Fortune. London: D. Scott, 1886. Republished as Practical Palmistry for the Amateur. Boston: St. Bartholph Soc., 1917.
- Her Last Run: A Novel. 2 vol. London: F. V. White, 1889.
- Blight. 1 vol. London: Osgood, McIlvaine, 1897.
- A Gentleman. 1 vol. London: John Murray, 1900.
- Dumb. 1 vol. London: Chatto and Windus, 1901.
- Unofficial: A Two Days' Drama. Westminster: A. Constable, 1902.
- Leroux. London: Greening, 1908.
- Vane Royal. London: J. Long, 1908.
- Nameless: A Novel. London: J. Murray, 1909.
- His Alien Enemy. London: J. Murray, 1918.
