= List of diplomats of the United Kingdom to Peru =

His Majesty's Ambassador to Peru
- Coat of arms of the United Kingdom

- British diplomatic flag
- Incumbent; Su-Lin Garbett-Shiels since January 2026
- Foreign, Commonwealth and Development Office; British Embassy in Lima
- Style: His Excellency
- Reports to: Secretary of State for Foreign, Commonwealth and Development Affairs
- Residence: JW Marriott Hotel Lima
- Appointer: The Crown on advice of the prime minister
- Term length: At His Majesty's pleasure
- Inaugural holder: William Stafford-Jerningham; Minister Resident and Consul-General
- Formation: 1873
- Website: British Embassy Lima

Below is a list of heads of mission from the United Kingdom to the Republic of Peru since 1874:

== Heads of mission ==
=== Ministers resident and consuls-general ===
- 1824–1824: Thomas Rowcroft
- 1873–1874: Hon. William Stafford-Jerningham (previously Chargé d'Affaires and Consul-General to the Republic of Peru)
- 1874–1884: Spenser St. John
- 1885–1894: Charles Mansfield
- 1894–1898: Henry Mitchell Jones, also to Ecuador 1895

=== Envoys extraordinary and ministers plenipotentiary ===
- 1898–1908: William Beauclerk (also to Bolivia and Ecuador; died in 1908 in Lima)
- 1908–1913: Charles des Graz (also to Bolivia and Ecuador)
- 1914–1919: Ernest Rennie (also to Ecuador)
- 1920–1923: Arthur Grant Duff (also to Ecuador)
- 1923–1928: Lord Herbert Hervey (also to Ecuador)
- 1929–1933: Charles Bentinck (also to Ecuador)
- 1934–1944: Courtenay Forbes (also to Ecuador until 1935)

=== Ambassadors extraordinary and plenipotentiary ===
- 1944–1945: Sir Courtenay Forbes
- 1945–1948: Walter Roberts
- 1949–1951: Sir James Dodds
- 1951–1953: Sir Oswald Scott
- 1953–1958: Sir William Montagu-Pollock
- 1958–1963: Sir Berkeley Gage
- 1963–1967: Robert Marett
- 1967–1970: David Muirhead
- 1970–1974: Hugh Travers Morgan
- 1974–1977: Kenneth Jamieson
- 1977–1979: William Harding
- 1979–1983: Charles Wallace
- 1983–1987: John Shakespeare
- 1987–1989: Adrian Beamish
- 1990–1995: Keith Haskell
- 1995–1999: John Illman
- 1999–2003: Roger Hart
- 2003–2006: Richard Ralph
- 2006–2010: Catherine Nettleton
- 2010–2014: James Dauris
- 2014–2018: Anwar Choudhury
- 2018–2022: Kate Harrisson
- 2022–2025: Gavin Cook
- 2026–present: Su-Lin Garbett-Shiels

== See also ==
- List of ambassadors of Peru to the United Kingdom
