= Berkeley Gage =

Sir Berkeley Everard Foley Gage, KCMG (27 February 1904 – 3 March 1994) was a British diplomat. He was British Ambassador to Thailand from 1954 to 1957 and British Ambassador to Peru from 1958 to 1963.

== Life and career ==
A member of the Gage family and a descendant of General Thomas Gage, Berkeley Gage was the son of Brigadier-General Moreton Foley Gage, DSO and his first wife, Anne Massie, daughter of William Everard Strong, of New York. He had a younger brother, Major Edward Fitzhardinge Peyton Gage, sometime High Sheriff of Shropshire. He spent his early years in Washington, D.C., where his father was military attaché at the British Embassy.

After education at Eton College and Trinity College, Cambridge, Gage was appointed a Third Secretary in the Foreign Office or Diplomatic Service in 1928 and posted to Rome the same year. Transferred to the Foreign Office in 1931, he was promoted Second Secretary in 1933, and was appointed Private Secretary to the Parliamentary Under-Secretary of State in 1934. After serving in Peking in 1935, he returned to the Foreign Office in 1938, was posted China in 1941, to the Foreign Office in 1944, and was part of the British delegation to the Dumbarton Oaks Conference the same year and to the San Francisco Conference from April to June 1945.

Appointed a Grade 5 Foreign Service Officer in 1950, he was Counsellor at British Embassy at The Hague from 1947 to 1950, serving as chargé d'affaires in 1947 and 1948. He was Consul-General at Chicago from 1950 to 1954, British Ambassador to Thailand from 1954 to 1957, and British Ambassador to Peru from 1958 to 1963.

After retirement, he was chairman of the British National Export Council's Latin America Committee from 1964 to 1966, and of the Anglo-Peruvian Society from 1969 to 1971. He was also a trustee of the Fund for International Student Co-operation in 1967, a member of the Council for Volunteers Overseas from 1964 to 1966 and of the Council of the Council of the Fauna Preservation Society from 1969 to 1973. He published his memoirs, It's Been A Marvellous Party! in 1989.

== Honours ==
Gage was appointed CMG in 1949, promoted KCMG in 1955, and appointed a Grand Cross of the Peruvian Order of the Sun in 1964.

== Family ==
Gage married in 1931 Maria von Chapuis, of Liegnitz, Silesia; they had two sons. Their marriage was dissolved in 1954, and the same year he married Mrs Lillian Riggs Miller (née Vukmirovic), of Dubrovnik. Lady Gage died in 2009.
