= Avenida Larco =

Avenue in Lima, Peru

Avenida José Alberto Larco
- Avenida Larco
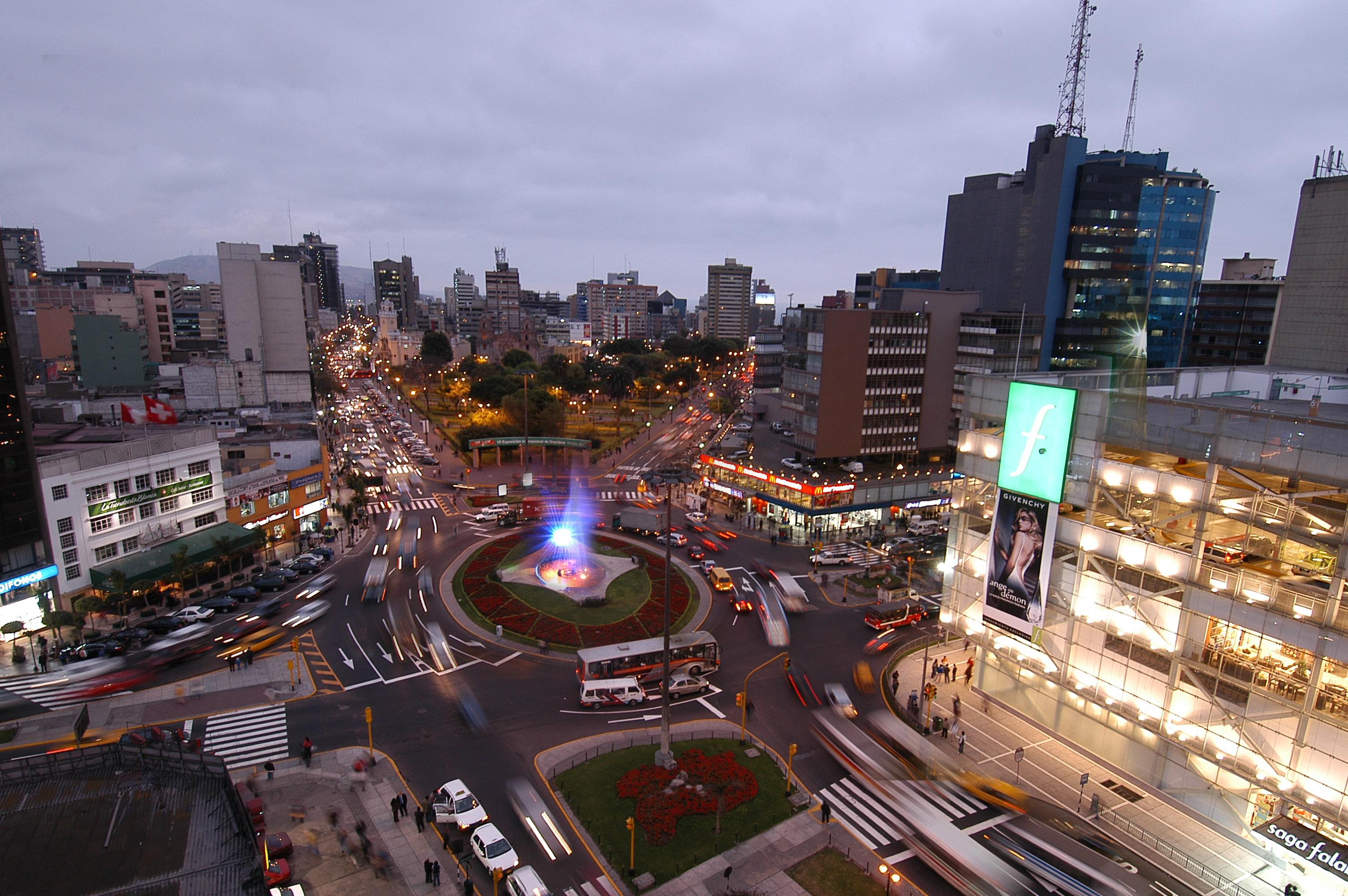
- Miraflores Central Park and Larco Avenue (left)
- Namesake: José Larco
- Location: Miraflores, Lima, Peru
- North end: Óvalo de Miraflores
- Major junctions: List: Calle Manuel Bonilla; Calle Esperanza; Pasaje El Porvenir; Calle Cantuarias; Avenida Ernesto Diez Canseco; Calle Schell; Calle Tarata; Avenida Alfredo Benavides; Calle Bolívar; Calle San Martín; Avenida 28 de Julio; Calle Manco Cápac; Calle José Gonzáles; Calle Juan Fanning; Calle Diego Ferré; Calle Arístides Aljovín
- South end: Avenida Armendariz

Construction
- Inauguration: July 22, 1941

Other
- Known for: Upscale malls and nightlife

José Alberto Larco Avenue (Spanish: Avenida José Alberto Larco) is a major avenue in Miraflores, an affluent district of Lima, Peru. It begins next to the district's central park and travels from north to south until it reaches Larcomar, where it intersects with the Malecón de la Reserva to the west and Armendáriz Avenue to the east.

== Name ==
The avenue is named after José Larco, who served as mayor of Miraflores from 1891 to 1893, also becoming the founder and first president of the Banco Italiano.

== History ==
The street was developed as one of many small roads during the early 20th century. According to composer Manuel Acosta Ojeda, it was originally a stone-lined waving path, where carts drawn by donkeys would travel alongside cars. It was reworked during a 15-month period and inaugurated as an avenue on July 22, 1941, by then president Manuel Prado Ugarteche.

The avenue inspired Avenida Larco, an album by local band Frágil. The album's single of the same name serves as the band's signature song.

== Route ==
It originates at the Óvalo de Miraflores, a roundabout in the center of the district, and runs south, towards Avenida Armendariz and the pier. It is primarily an affluent commercial street, home to various boutiques, casinos, luxury hotels, bars, and nightclubs. It is the setting of numerous works of literature that depict Lima's social elite and provides historical context to Lima's upper classes, among them works by Alfredo Bryce and Nobel laureate Mario Vargas Llosa.

Among the most important locations on this street are: the Hilton and Marriott hotels; the municipal palace and its Sala Luis Miró Quesada Garland, a major art gallery; the Parque Mar tower, among the tallest buildings in Peru and home to the embassies of the Netherlands, the United Kingdom, and the United Arab Emirates; and, the Larcomar shopping mall.

== See also ==
- Avenida Arequipa
