= Bulevar San Ramón =

Street in Lima, Peru

San Ramón Boulevard
- Paseo San Ramón, Pizza Street
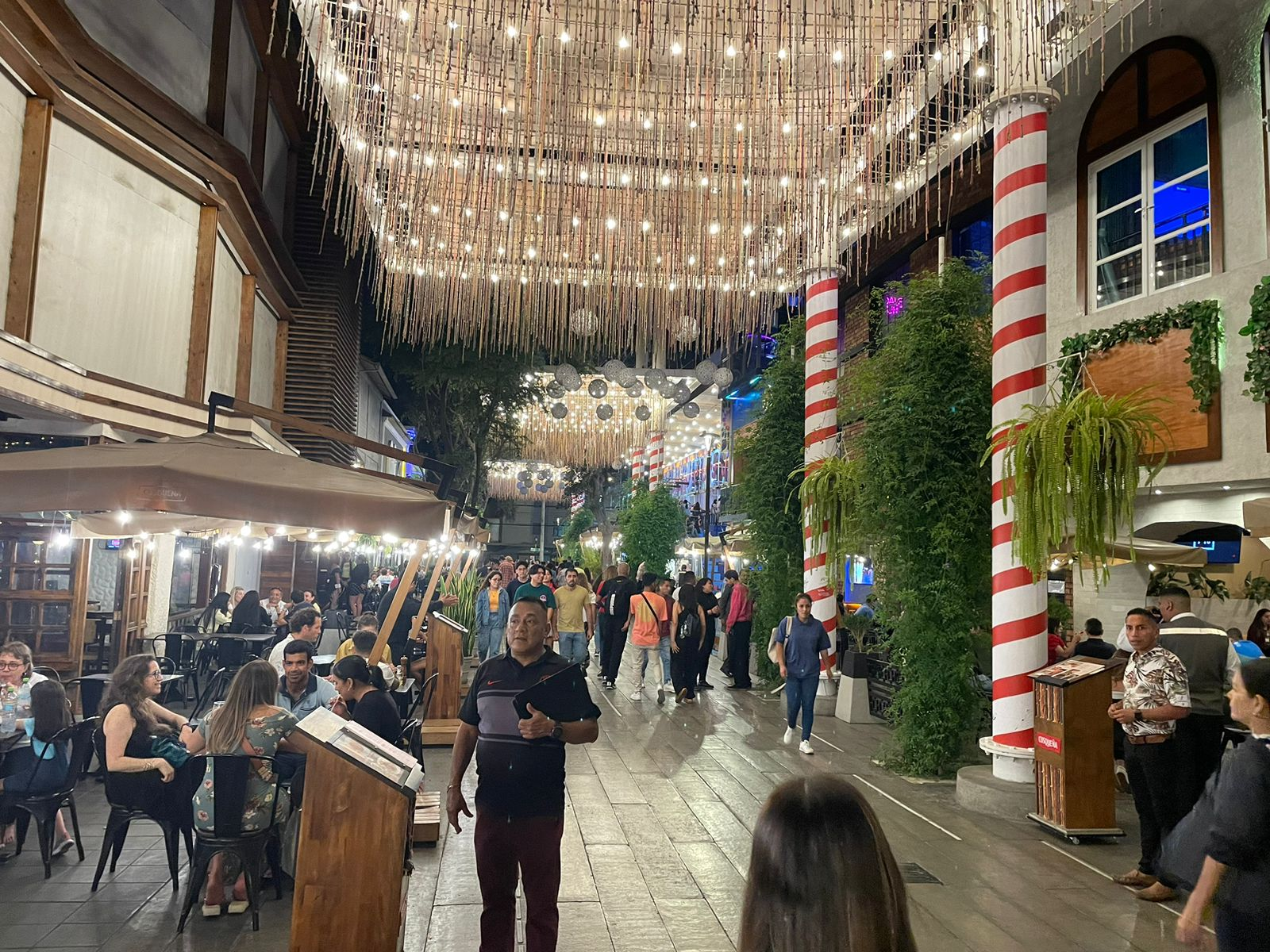
- Interactive map of San Ramón Boulevard
- Type: Pedestrian street
- Location: Miraflores District, Lima

Other
- Known for: Pizzerias and nightclubs

San Ramón Boulevard (Spanish: Bulevar San Ramón), formerly Paseo San Ramón, is a pedestrian street in Miraflores District, Lima. It is also known as Pizza Street (Spanish: Calle de las Pizzas) by locals due to it being traditionally populated by pizzerias.

== History ==
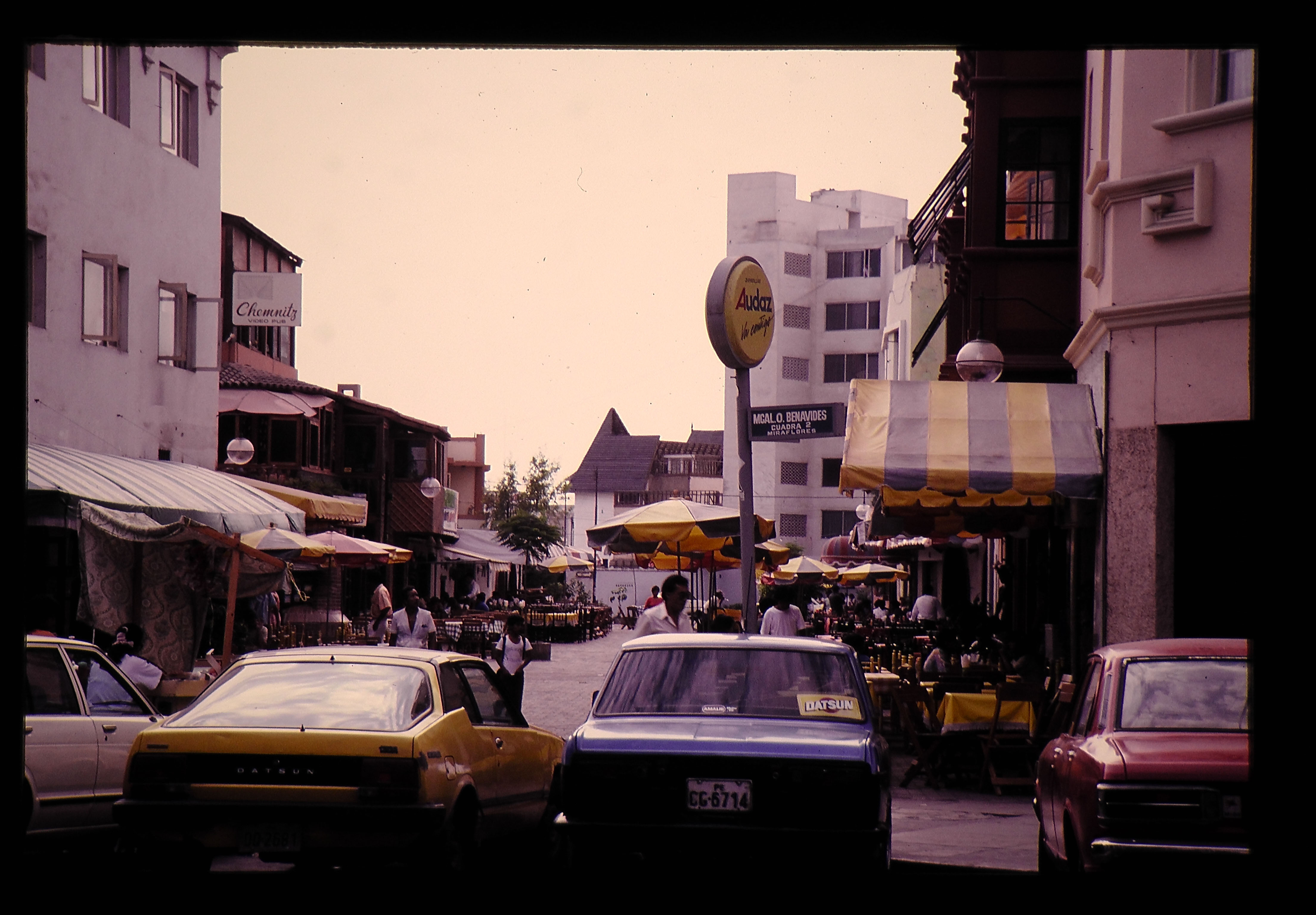
The street in 1988.

The street was the location of houses that survived the War of the Pacific and other buildings built in the 1930s to 1940s, later becoming the location of restaurants, but most notably, pizzerias, in the 1970s to 1980s. The street did not become a pedestrian street until the 1980s.

Despite its nickname, the street's pizzerias were eventually phased out in favour of nightclubs or karaoke bars, becoming the minority. An increase in crime caused security measures to be strengthened in the late 2010s, and in 2019, the Municipality of Miraflores announced that the street would become a boulevard. The street was affected by the COVID-19 pandemic in 2020, with many stores closing as a result.

The boulevard project was completed in 2021, and the new San Ramón Boulevard was inaugurated on December 21 of the same year.

== See also ==
- Kennedy Park (Lima), located across the street from the boulevard.
