= Oswald Scott =

British diplomat

Sir Oswald Arthur Scott, KCMG, DSO (17 June 1893 – 19 May 1960) was a British diplomat.

== Biography ==
The second son of Archibald Scott, of Rotherfield Park, Alton, Hampshire, Scott was educated at Eton College and Magdalen College, Oxford. He served with the Hampshire Regiment during the First World War, was appointed DSO and mentioned in despatches. Joining the Diplomatic Service in 1919, he was British Minister to Finland from 1947 to 1951 and British Ambassador to Peru from 1951 to 1953. He retired in 1954.

Scott was appointed CMG in 1946 and KCMG in 1951.
