= Palacio Municipal de Miraflores =

Building in Lima, Peru

Coordinates: 12.1218°S 77.0293°W

Miraflores Municipal Palace
- Palacio Municipal de Miraflores
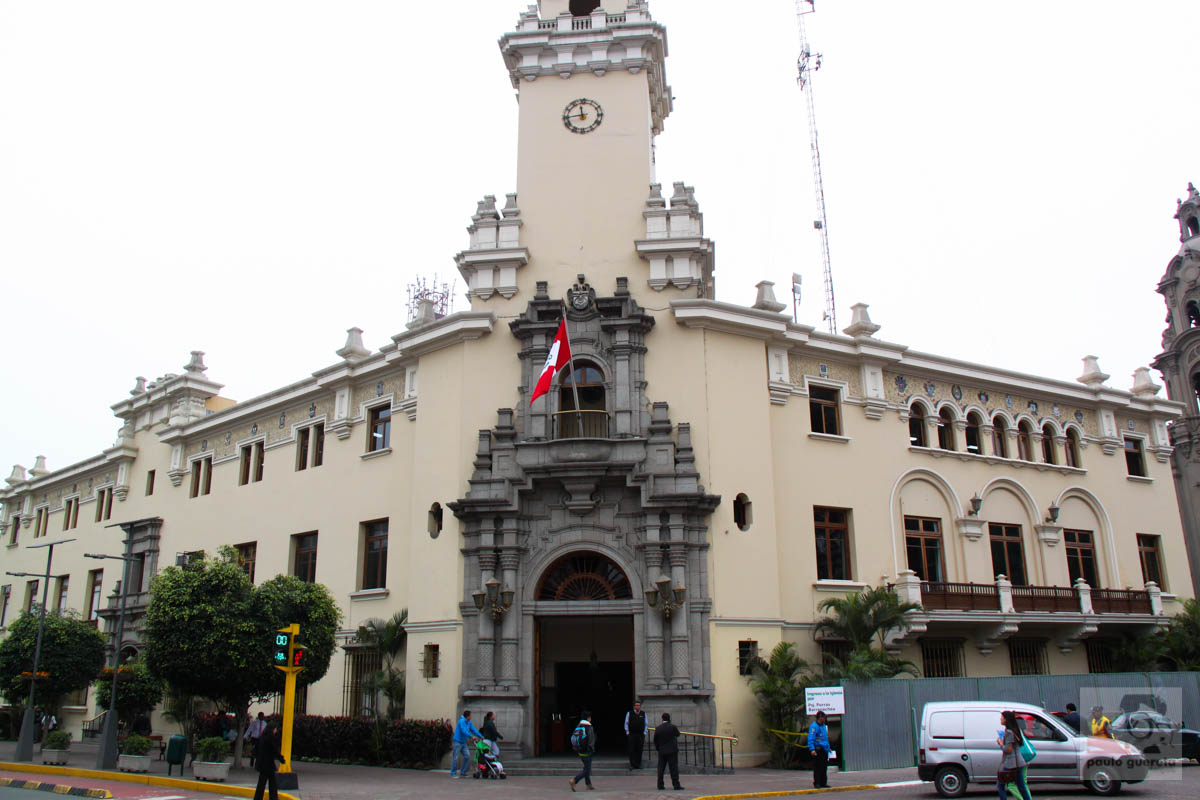
- The building in 2015

General information
- Type: Rathaus
- Architectural style: Neocolonial
- Location: Miraflores District, Lima
- Address: Av. Larco 400
- Owner: Municipality of Miraflores

Design and construction
- Architect(s): Luis Miró Quesada Garland

The Municipal Palace of Miraflores (Spanish: Palacio Municipal de Miraflores) is the current headquarters of the municipal corporation of the Lima district of Miraflores in Peru. It is located at number 400 Larco Avenue, in front of Miraflores Central Park. It was declared a national monument in 1999.

== History ==
The building, the work of the Peruvian architect Luis Miró Quesada Garland, was inaugurated on July 28, 1944, during the municipal management of Mayor Carlos Alzamora, replacing the previous headquarters located in a mansion at the intersection of Bellavista and José Gálvez avenues.

== Overview ==
The Palace is neocolonial in style, and has four floors that house offices and environments for attending the public.

It was built in brick and reinforced concrete. As architectural elements, its corner tower and its façade stand out. In the internal spaces are the town hall, and the rotunda on the second floor, adorned with murals by the Peruvian painter Teodoro Núñez Ureta.

== Gallery ==
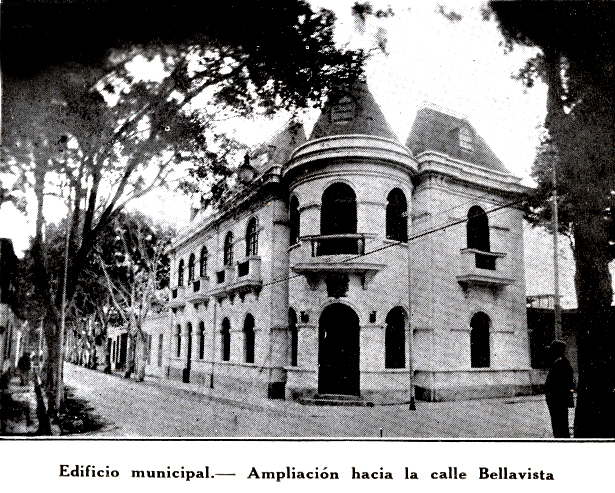
Former building

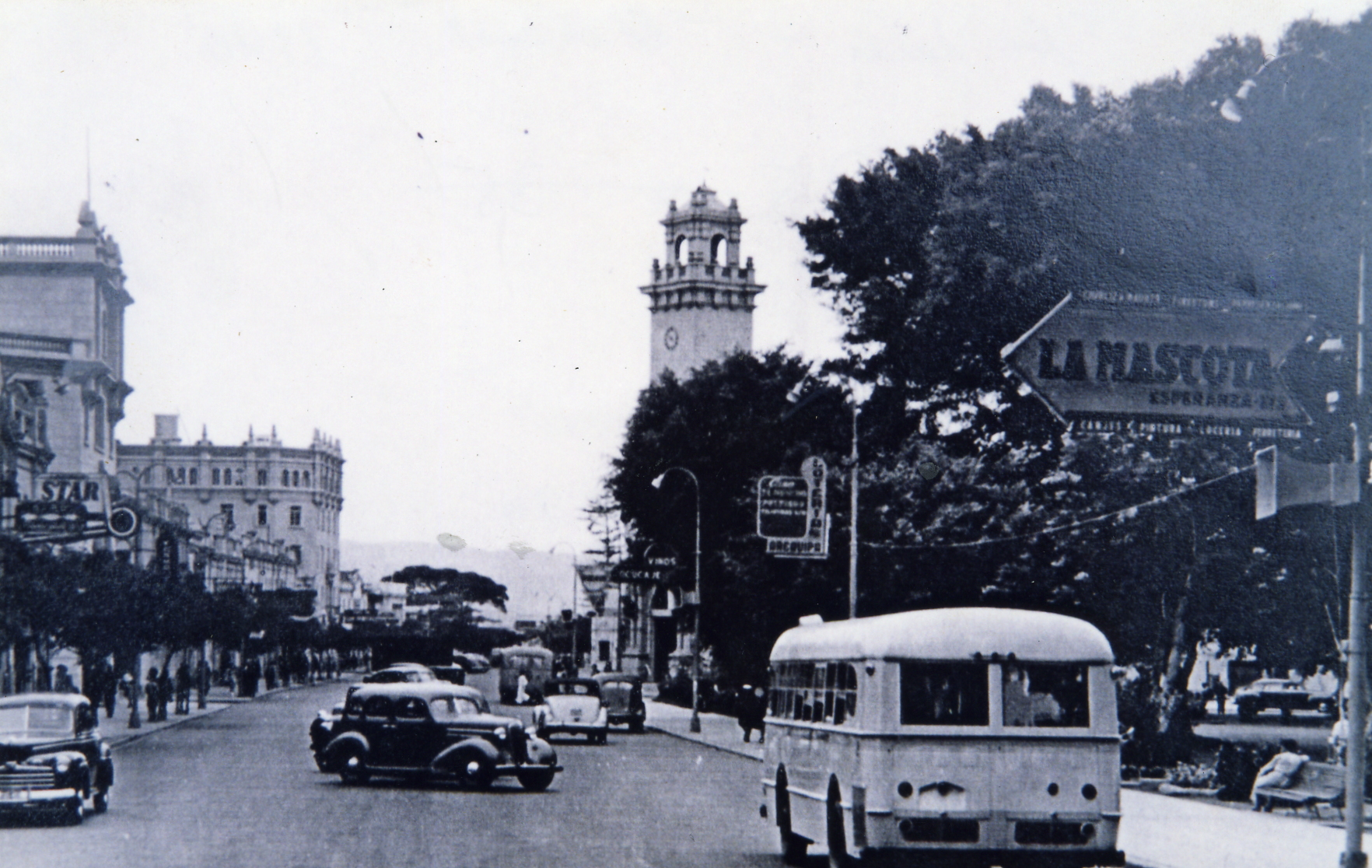
Larco Avenue in 1945. The Palace's tower can be seen.

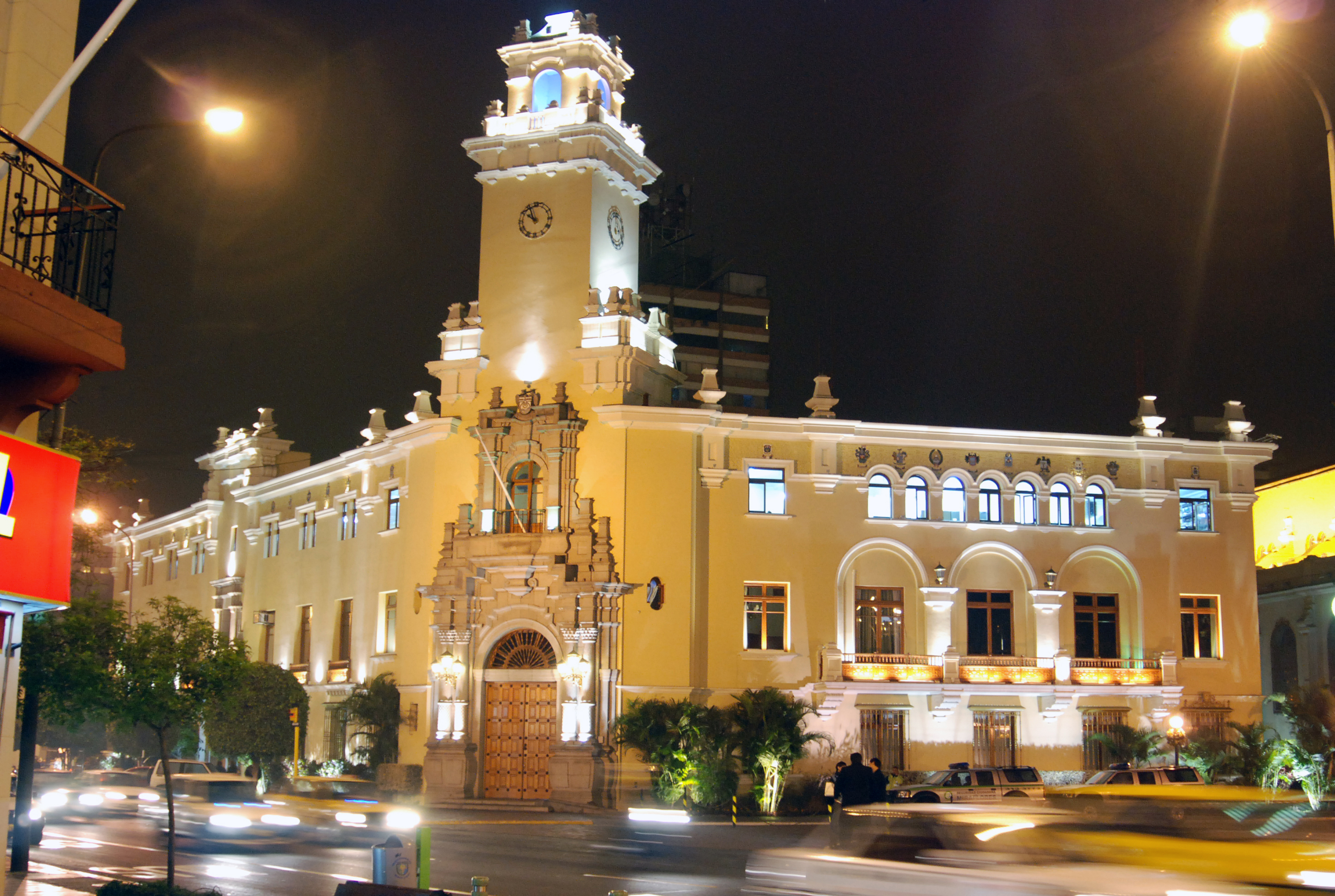
The Palace at night

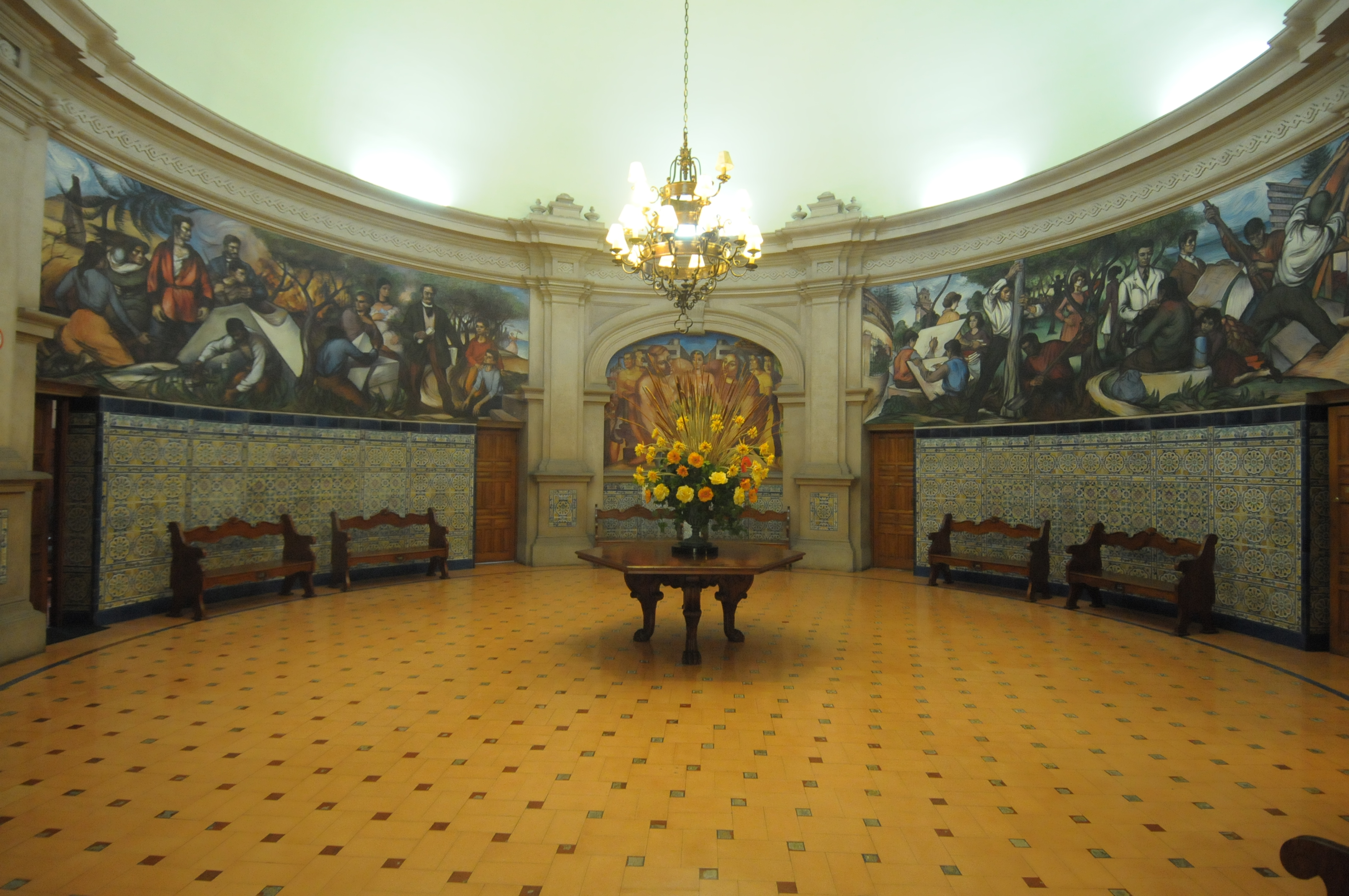
Interior of the second floor of the Palace, with the murals by Teodoro Nuñez Ureta.

== See also ==
- Miraflores Central Park
- Palacio Municipal de Lima
