= JW Marriott Hotel Lima =

Luxury hotel in Lima, Peru

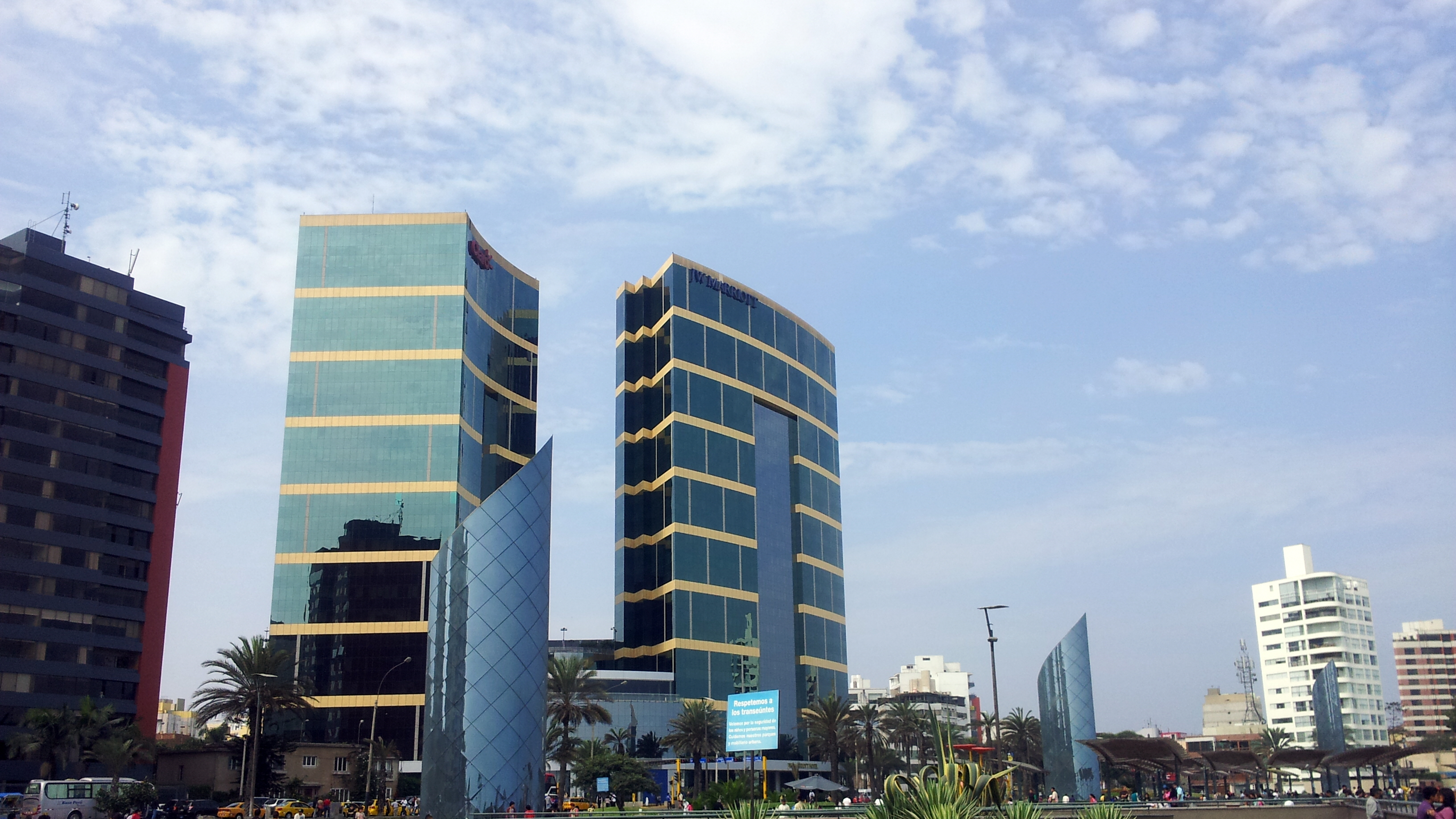

General information
- Architectural style: Modern
- Address: Malecón de la Reserva 615, Miraflores District, Lima
- Coordinates: 12.1314°S 77.0296°W
- Year(s) built: 1998–2000
- Inaugurated: July 25, 2000
- Owner: JW Marriott Hotels

Technical details
- Floor count: 25
- Grounds: 50,000 m^{2} (540,000 sq ft)

Design and construction
- Architecture firm: Arquitectonica; Graña y Montero

Other information
- Number of rooms: 300
- Facilities: See list: Restaurants: La Vista; JW Market; JW Lounge; Pool Bar; Embassies: Netherlands; United Arab Emirates; United Kingdom

The JW Marriott Hotel Lima, known locally as the Marriott Hotel (Spanish: Hotel Marriott), is a modern building complex and five-star high-rise hotel located next to Larcomar, at the intersection of José Larco Avenue and the Malecón de Miraflores in Miraflores District, Lima, Peru.

Belonging to the Marriott Hotels & Resorts hotel chain, the two-tower complex houses the hotel, a casino, restaurants and an office building known as the Torre Parque Mar, which houses the embassies of the Netherlands, the United Arab Emirates, and the United Kingdom.

== History ==
The hotel was built between 1998 and 2000 next to Salazar Park, part of the esplanade of Miraflores. It was inaugurated in July 2000 as the Lima Marriott Hotel & Stellaris Casino. This name remained until January 2001, changing to JW Marriott Hotel & Stellaris Casino Lima until the casino's sale in March 2006, when it took its current name. In 2007, it was chosen as the chain's hotel of the year.

In 2002, the United Kingdom opened its embassy in the office building's 22nd floor. In 2016, the United Arab Emirates opened its embassy in its 11th floor. The Netherlands also has an embassy on the building's 13th floor.

In 2008, the hotel hosted U.S. President George W. Bush during his visit to that year's APEC summit. In 2024, it hosted Joe Biden during that year's summit.

In 2019, Grupo Breca acquired 100% of the shares owned by Inversiones La Rioja S.A., thus acquiring the hotel.

== See also ==
- Larcomar
- Malecón de Miraflores
