= Larcomar =

Shopping centre in Lima, Peru

Coordinates: 12°7′52″S 77°1′51″W

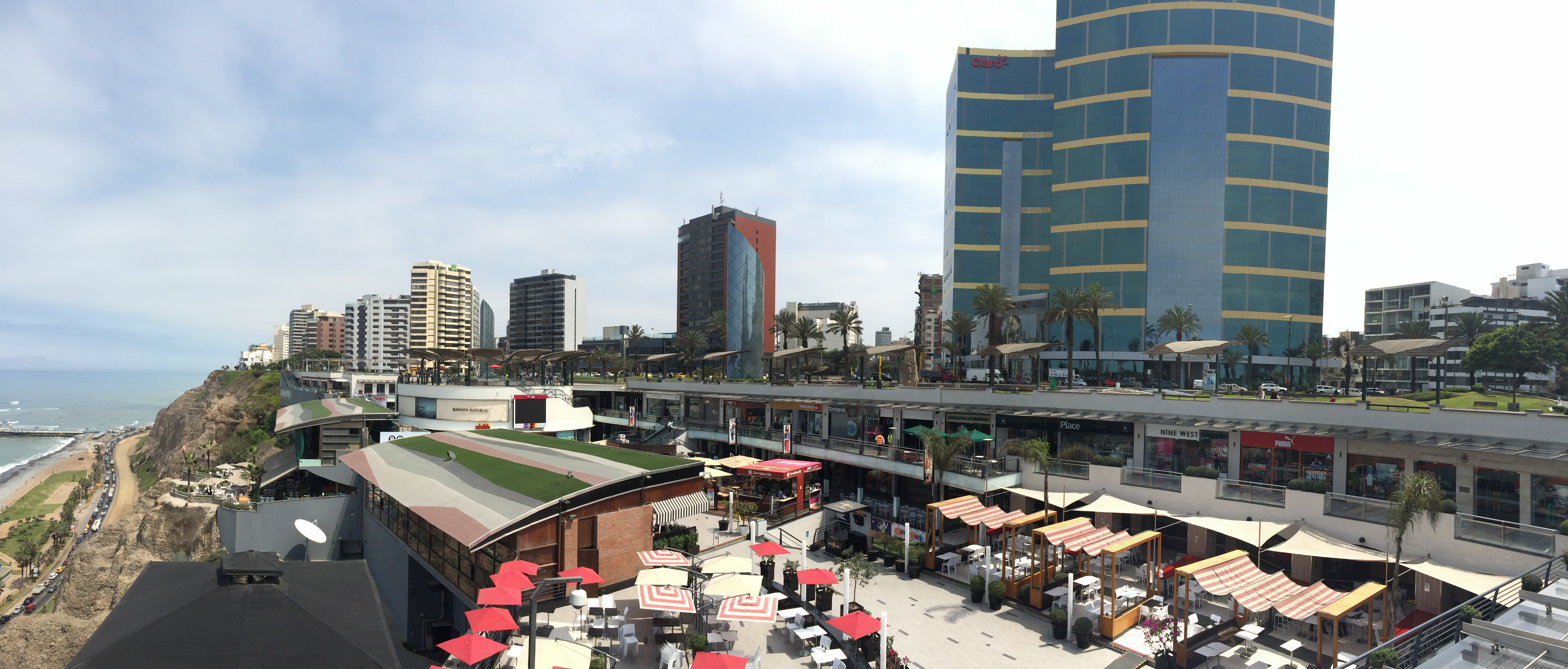
- General view in 2014
- Address: Malecón de la Reserva 610, Miraflores District, Lima
- Opened: November 27, 1998
- Owner: Parque Arauco S.A.
- Architect: Eduardo Figari Gold
- Num. of stores: 114 (As of 2019)
- Num. of anchor tenants: 5
- Floor area: 2,118,718 ft^{2} (196,835.3 m^{2})
- Floors: 4
- Parking: Multistorey, with valet parking.
- Website: www.larcomar.com

Larcomar (a portmanteau of "Larco" and "mar") is a shopping centre in Alfredo Salazar Park, located at the intersection of José Larco Avenue and the Malecón de la Reserva in Miraflores District, Lima, Peru. Owned by Chilean company Parque Arauco, it is frequently visited by both international tourists and locals.

Both the park and the mall are directly across the street from the JW Marriott Hotel Lima. The former serves as the access to the latter, and also features facilities such as a children's playground, a scenic overlook, kiosks, and commemorative monuments.

== History ==
The area was originally part of the Hacienda Armendáriz, one of many such estates surrounding Lima at the time.

=== Original park and monument ===
The original park was dedicated to Alfredo Salazar Southwell, a local aviator who sacrificed himself after his aircraft malfunctioned on the morning of September 14, 1937. It was inaugurated in 1953, and featured a three-metre monument in his honour by Hungarian sculptor Lajos D’Ebneth, built from pink travertine marble brought from the country's central highlands.

The announcement of a mall and its construction plans were criticised by locals, including writer Mario Vargas Llosa, since it involved the destruction of a lush park and its acoustic shell and "Rincón Gaucho" restaurant.

=== New park and shopping centre ===
The mall was ultimately inaugurated on November 27, 1998, by its architect, Eduardo Figari Gold. Until 2001, a Hard Rock Cafe restaurant operated in its central building. The chain would not return to the country until 2012, when it opened a store in the Jockey Plaza Shopping Center, after which it considered re-opening its original store in Larcomar soon after, as well as new locations in the country.

In 2010, it was acquired by Chilean company Parque Arauco S.A.

In 2015, the Municipality of Miraflores and the British Embassy inaugurated a statue of Paddington Bear—one of three in the country and one of fifty in total, all of which formed a trail until December 30 of that year—at the park's children's area.

On Wednesday, 16 November 2016, a fire broke out at a showing of Fantastic Beasts and Where to Find Them at theatre 11 of UVK Multicines, the mall's movie theatre. Its cause was initially unknown to local authorities, with the National Police of Peru eventually concluding that its origin was provoked due to a security camera showing a man, later identified as Luis Raúl Salazar Belito, walking out of the movie theatre in a suspicious manner. Although he initially surrendered to the police, he later denied his involvement in the fire. Later on, however, the Police's DIESE (División de Investigaciones Especiales de Seguridad del Estado) unit concluded that the fire was caused by a short circuit. In total, more than 200 people were evacuated from the mall, and 12 different fire fighting units arrived during the fire. Four employees were unable to escape the fire and died due to smoke inhalation: Ana Betsabé Torres Cochachín (46), Joel Mario Condori Rejas (27), Zoledad Moreima Oliveros (42) and Sonia Graciela Repetto Chamochumbi (71).

Also affected by the fire was the mall's bowling alley, the Bowling Larcomar, originally inaugurated on November 24, 1988.

On September 14, 2022, a bust of Salazar was inaugurated by the Municipality and the Peruvian Air Force.

== See also ==
- JW Marriott Hotel Lima
- Malecón de Miraflores
