= Miraflores Central Park =

Park in Lima

Coordinates: 12°07′16″S 77°01′47″W

- Kennedy Park
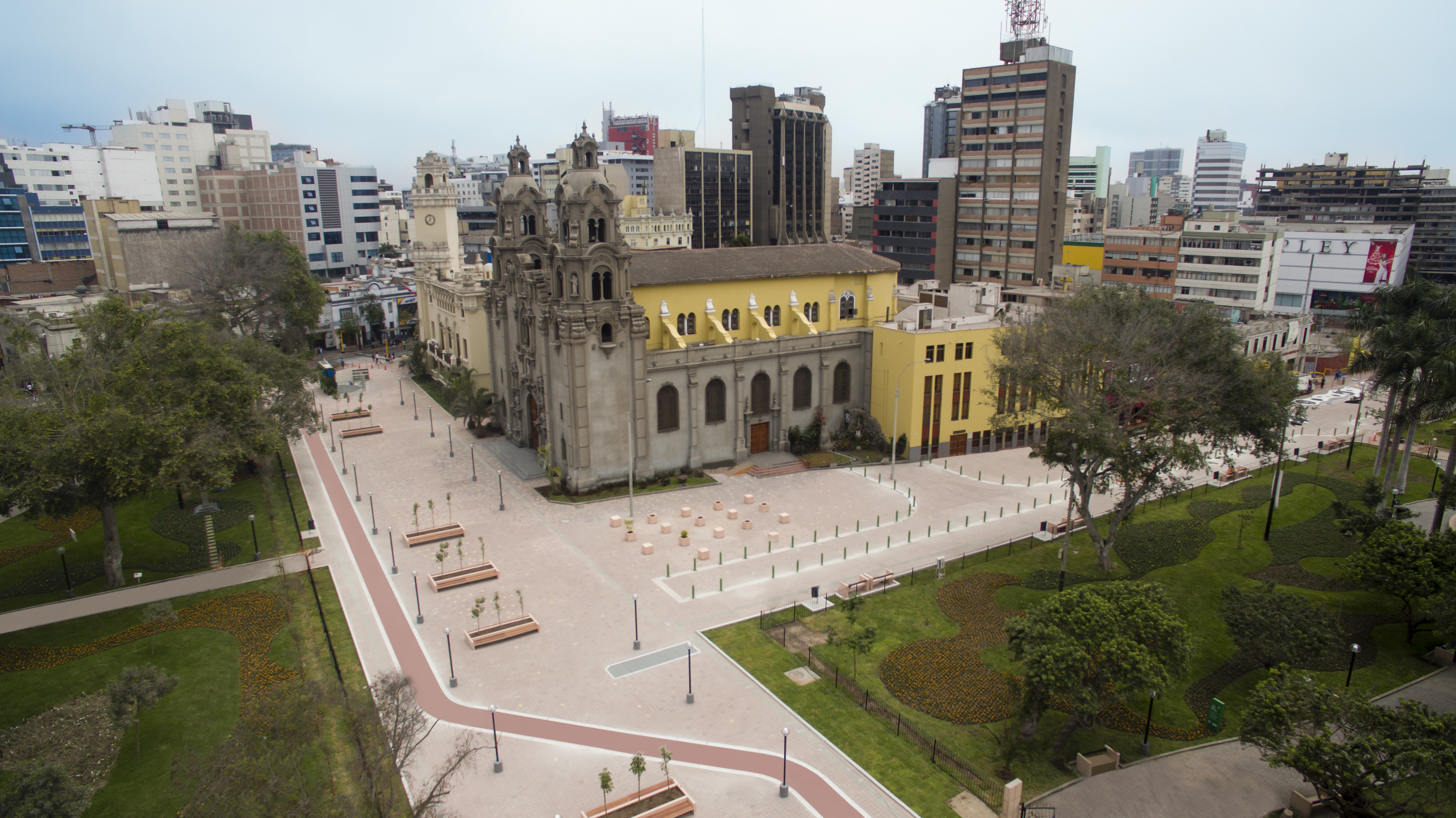
- View of the park's church and palace
- Interactive map of Miraflores Central Park
- Type: Public park
- Location: Miraflores District, Lima
- Area: 22,000 m^{2}
- Created: 1920s
- Operator: Municipality of Miraflores
- Open: 24 hours

Miraflores Central Park (Spanish: Parque Central de Miraflores), commonly known as Kennedy Park (Spanish: Parque Kennedy), is a public park located in Miraflores, Lima, Peru. The park serves the district's main square, and is divided into two areas, one of which gives the park its common name. It is bordered by Miraflores Roundabout to the north, Larco and Diagonal avenues to the east and west, respectively, and Schell Street to the south.

Two streets—Lima and Virgen Milagrosa—pass through the park. The park is known for its large presence of street cats, and is commonly used for events such as book fairs and marathons, as well as Fiestas Patrias celebrations such as the Corso Wong, and political and social protests.

== Name ==
The park is officially called "Miraflores Central Park" (Spanish: Parque Central de Miraflores), also simply called "Miraflores Park" (Spanish: Parque de Miraflores). Despite the name, the area is divided into two parks: John F. Kennedy Park (Spanish: Parque John F. Kennedy), named after the late U.S. president, and 7 June Park (Spanish: Parque 7 de Junio), named after the date of the Battle of Arica.

The former gives the entire park complex its popular name, Kennedy Park.

== History ==
The area that houses the park today saw conflict towards the end of the campaign to take Lima during the War of the Pacific in what was known as the Battle of Miraflores. An area it eventually expanded to located west of its church was originally the site of buildings, such as the Gran Hotel, which was destroyed by a fire immediately following the battle among other buildings, such as the rancho across the street.

The park's official name was established in 1900 and has remained since, originally being known after its church, San Miguel de Miraflores.

The area did not see much development until the construction of the Iglesia Matriz Virgen Milagrosa church in 1939, after which it expanded around its area, eventually being divided into two parks: the John F. Kennedy Park, named after U.S. President John F. Kennedy for his role in the Alliance for Progress, and the 7 June Park, named after the Battle of Arica of the War of the Pacific.

In the 1990s, the area was reportedly plagued by rats, which caused local residents organised by the church to start leaving their cats in the park, with the latter eventually replacing the former in large numbers. The presence of cats today serve as a tourist attraction.

A bust of Kennedy is featured in the homonymous park, having been inaugurated on November 21, 2003, by then mayor of Miraflores Fernando Andrade Carmona on the occasion of twinning Miraflores with Pensacola, Florida. Also featured in the park is an amphitheatre of singer Chabuca Granda.

Due to a lack of parking space, a long-planned 4-storey underground car park began construction in 2015 after a three-year delay due to the belief that the park held the remains of Peruvian soldiers killed during the 1881 battle. The Ministry of Culture eventually launched an investigation to verify this claim, with the construction group receiving a certificate that guaranteed the non-existence of human remains in June 2014. It was eventually inaugurated on December 15, 2016, thus eliminating parking lots on adjoining avenues and widening the sidewalks.

In 2019, the park was the start and finish line of a marathon that took place as part of the larger Pan American Games for both men and women.

== Gallery ==
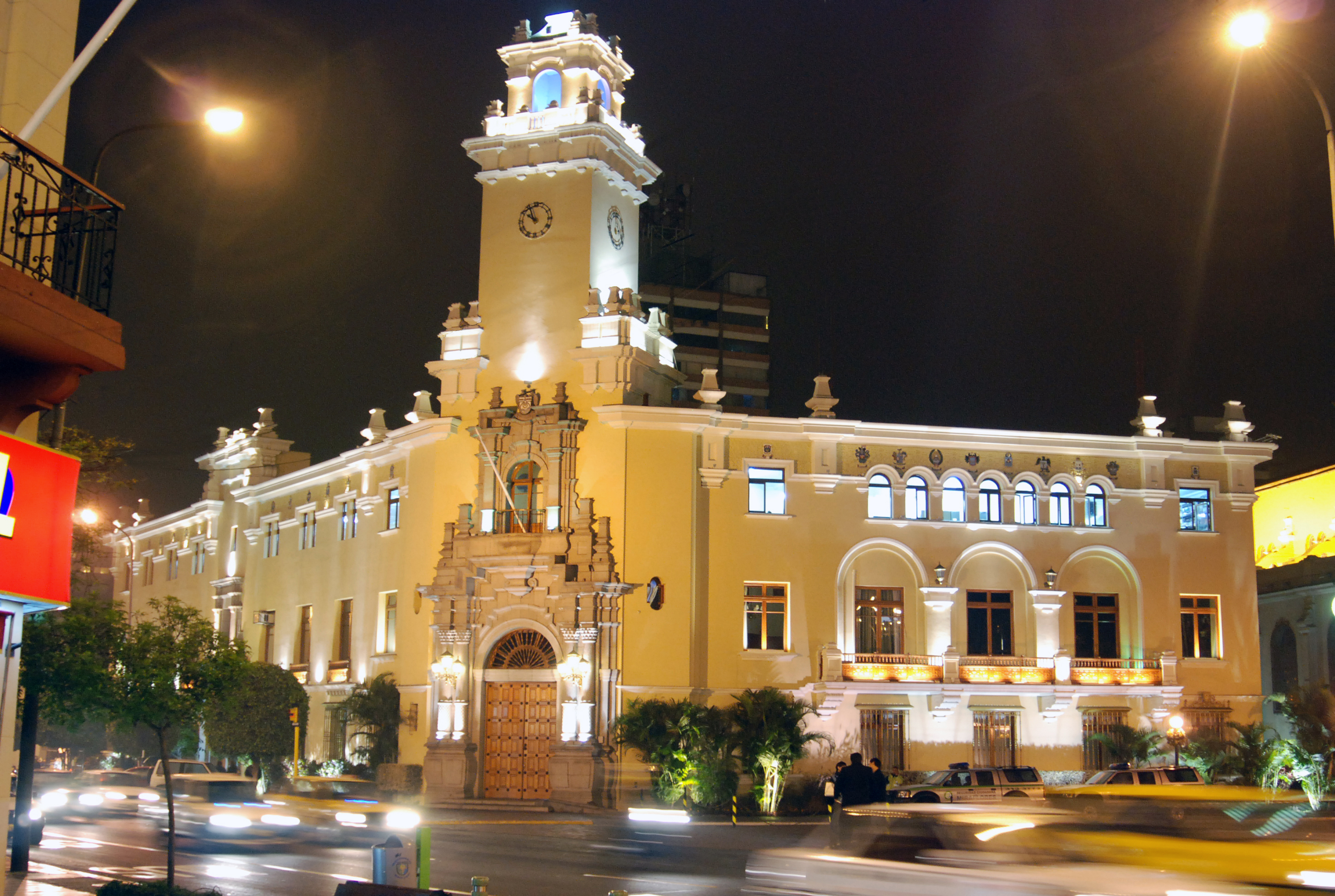
Town hall seen from Larco Avenue

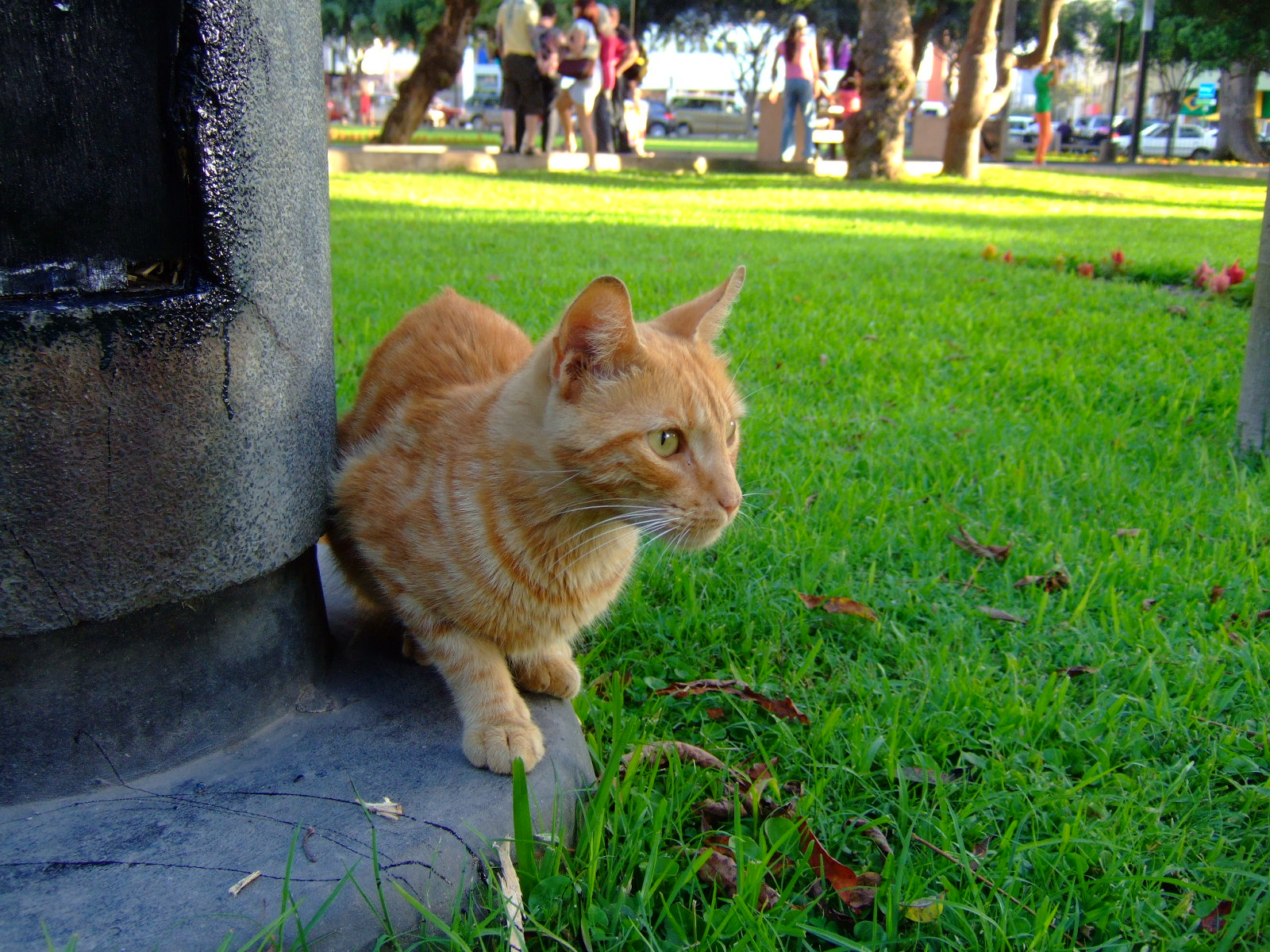
One of many street cats in the park

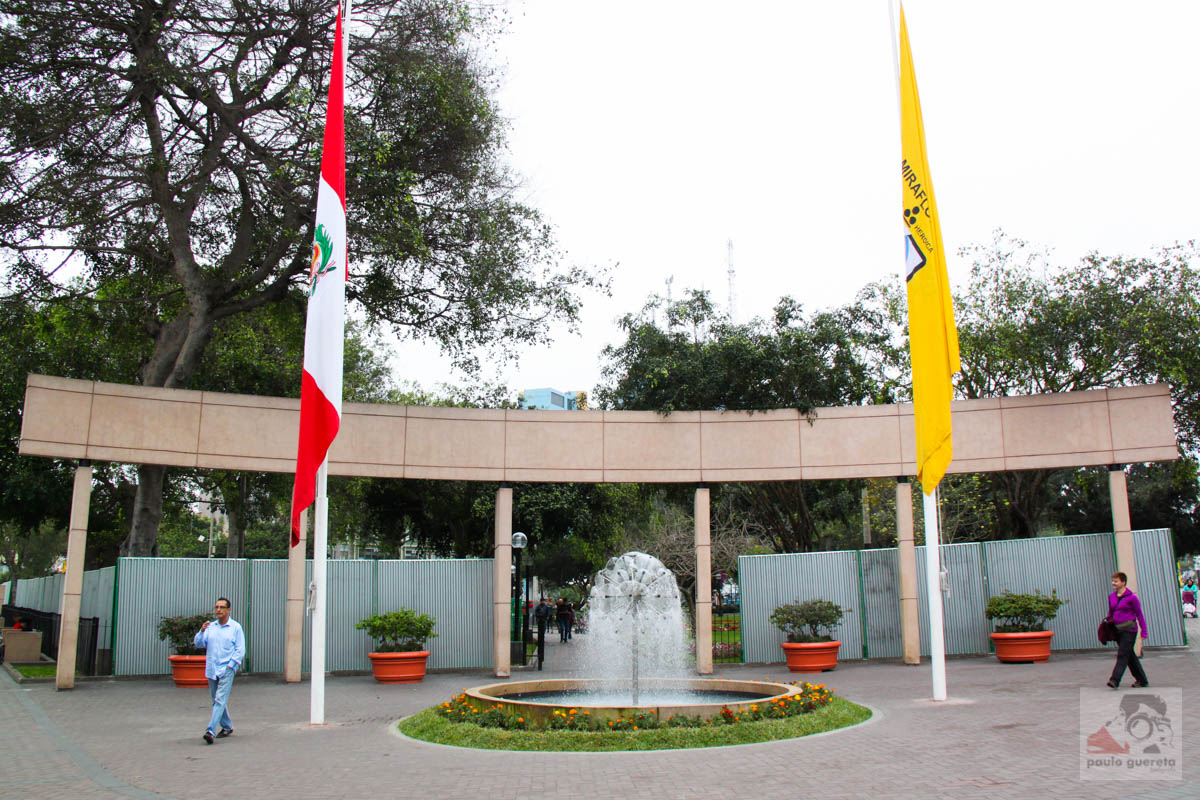
Entrance of 7 June Park

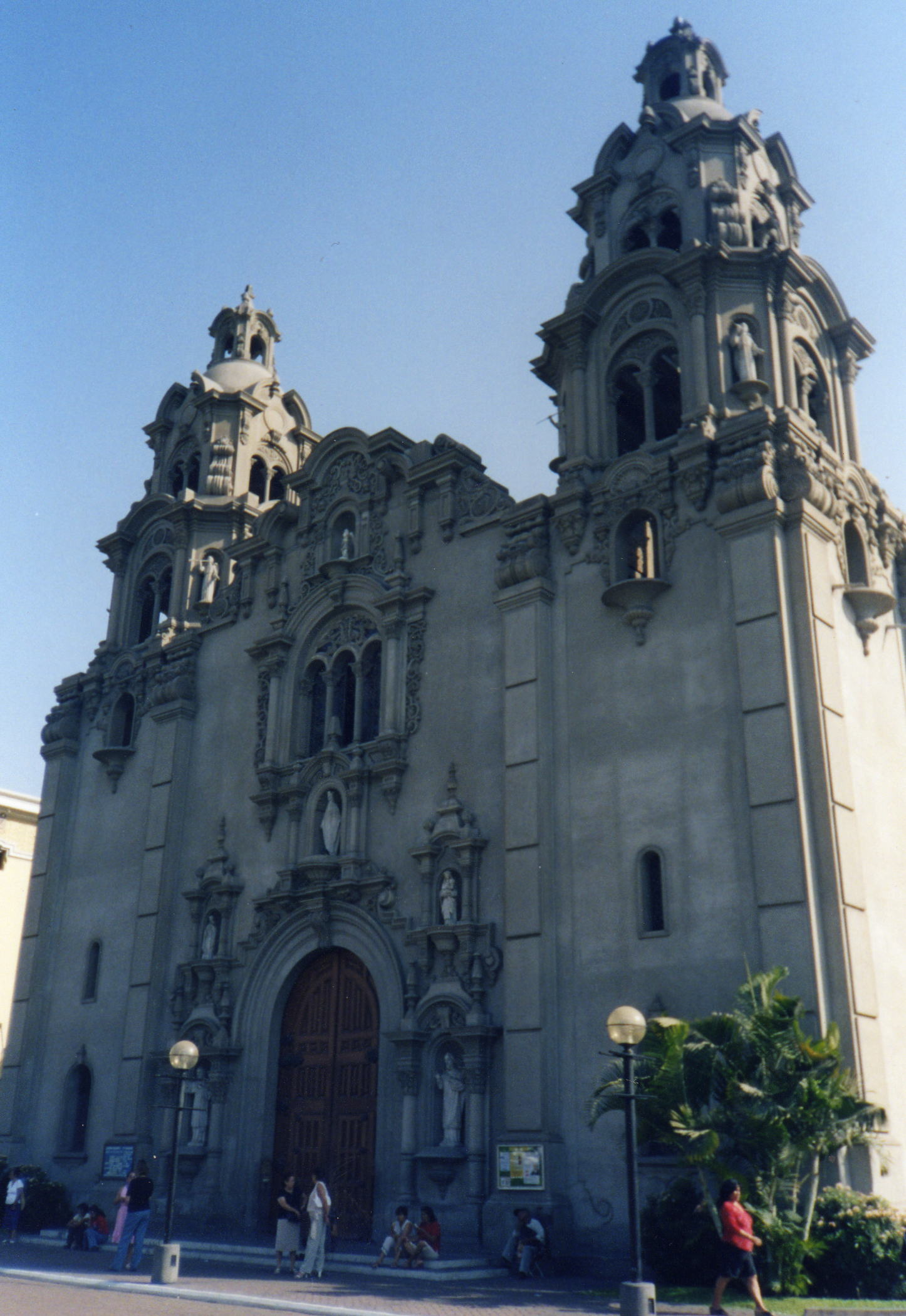
Virgen Milagrosa church

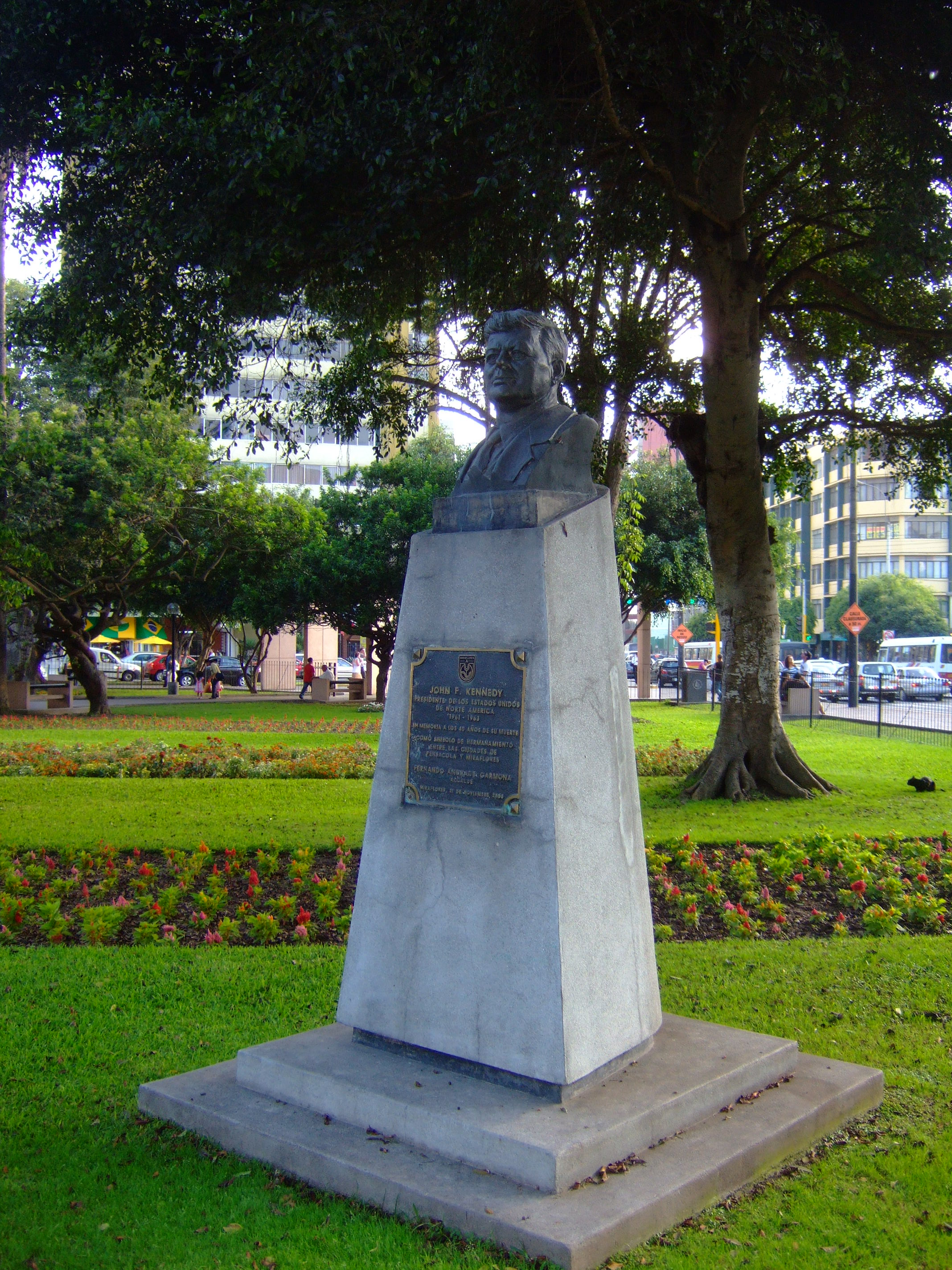
Bust of John F. Kennedy

== See also ==
- Calle de las Pizzas, located across the street
- University of Piura, located nearby
- Sinagoga 1870, located nearby
