= Love Park, Lima =

Park in Lima

Coordinates: 12°07′36″S 77°02′11″W

Parque del Amor
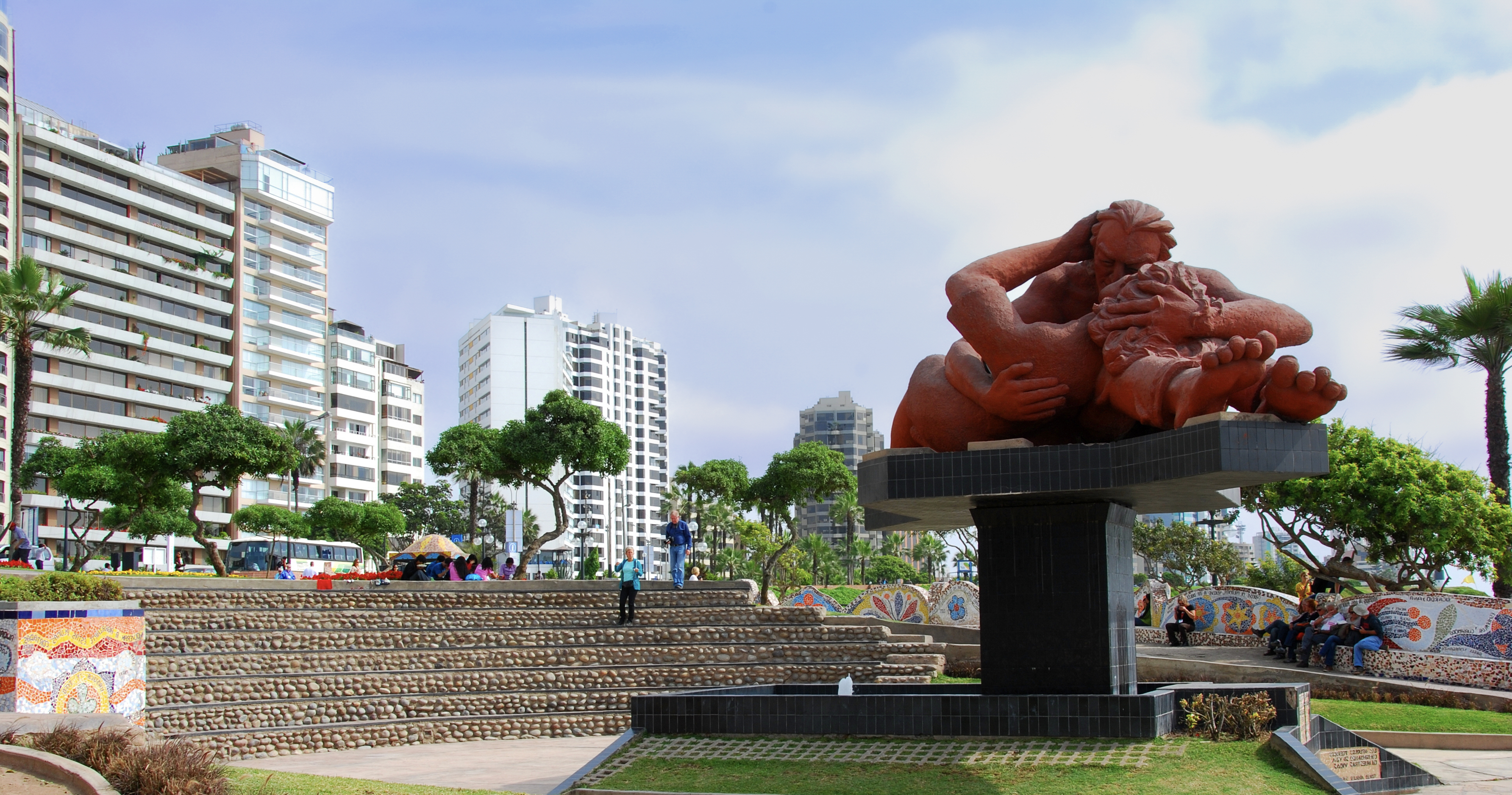
- The park and its sculpture in 2013
- Interactive map of Parque del Amor
- Type: Public park
- Location: Lima, Peru

Alberto Andrade Carmona Park (Spanish: Parque Alberto Andrade Carmona), better known as Love Park (Spanish: Parque del Amor), is a public park in Lima, Peru.

== Overview ==
It is located on the Cisneros boardwalk, a place that makes up the Miraflores boardwalk. The park is the location of El beso, a sculpture by Víctor Delfín. The place has a view of the Lima coastline and the Villena bridge. It was inaugurated on February 14, 1993. The park is surrounded by mosaics with phrases and poems about love in Spanish and Quechua. The trencadís decoration is inspired by Park Güell in Barcelona, Spain, designed by Antoni Gaudí. It was chosen by National Geographic magazine as one of the most romantic places in the world.

In 2014 it was renamed Alberto Andrade Carmona Park, in honor of the late mayor of Lima.
