= D. Bernard Amos =

- Born: 16 April 1923; Bromley, Kent, England
- Died: 15 May 2003 (aged 80); Durham, North Carolina
- Citizenship: American (born British)
- Education: Chelsea Polytechnic (B.S. and M.B.), Guy's Hospital Medical School (M.D., 1963)
- Known for: Transplantation immunology
- Awards: Golding Bird Prize in bacteriology
- Scientific career
- Fields: Immunology, genetics
- Institutions: Duke University

Dennis Bernard Amos (April 16, 1923 – May 15, 2003) was a British-born American immunologist. National Academies Press called him "one of the most distinguished scientists of the genetics of individuality of the twentieth century". In 1969, Amos and Dr. David Hume founded the first regional organ sharing program in the United States. Amos made significant contributions in immunogenetics, tumor immunity, and transplantation immunology.

== Awards and distinctions ==
Amos was president of the American Association of Immunologists, president and founder of the International Transplantation Society, and the co-founder and editor-in-chief of the journal Human Immunology. Amos was elected to the National Academies of Science. He received the 3M Award from FASEB, the Rose Payne Award for Distinguished Science by the American Society for Histocompatibility and Immunogenetics, and the National Institutes of Health Research Career Award. He was awarded the Golding Bird Prize in Bacteriology as well as the Leonard Luubock Gold Medal. Amos was professor of immunology and experimental surgery at Duke University from 1962 to 1993.

== Life and career ==
Amos was born April 16, 1923, in Bromley, Kent, England. He earned his B.S. and M.B from Chelsea Polytechnic and his M.D. from Guy's Hospital Medical School in 1963. He died in Durham, North Carolina on May 15, 2003.
