= Thalachallour Mohanakumar =

Indian Academic and Professor

Thalachallour Mohanakumar is an Indian academic and professor with a research interest in tumor immunology for lung/breast cancer and bone marrow transplantation. His academic title is the Jacqueline G. and William E. Maritz professor of surgery, Pathology, and Immunology in the Department of Surgery at Washington University School of Medicine.

From India, Mohanakumar's prior education includes a doctorate of veterinary medicine at Madras Veterinary College, a master's degree in microbiology from All-India Institute of Medical Sciences in New Delhi, and a PhD in immunology at Duke University.

During his time at Washington University in St. Louis, Mohanakumar has made numerous contributions in his success of clinical and research programs, including the immunological mechanisms underlying transplant rejection. Along with heading transplant programs, he also supervises islet location and is the Director of Histocompatibility, an important component of bone marrow and organ transplantation. He has received accomplishments, awards, and citations from the American Society for Histocompatibility and Immunogenetics, American Society of Transplantation, and the Juvenile Diabetes Research Foundation. In his research, he has published more than 350 manuscripts and has served on many National Institutes of Health (NIH) study sections. Mohanakumar and his research group have been studying the processes of lung transplant rejection for more than 20 years. Recently, they found a possible diagnosis for chronic lung allograft dysfunction (CLAD) by monitoring proteins, such as Zinc finger and BYB domain-containing protein 7A (ZBTB7A).
