= Villena (surname) =

Villena is a Spanish surname. Notable people with the surname include:

- Ahron Villena (born 1987), Filipino actor
- Andrés Villena (born 1993), Spanish professional volleyball player
- Arturo Moyers Villena (1930–2013), Mexican muralist and painter
- Daniela Santiago Villena (born 1982), Spanish transgender model and actress
- Diego Valverde Villena (born 1967), Spanish poet, essayist, and polyglot
- Enrique de Villena, Spanish medieval writer and scientist
- Guillermo Lohmann Villena (1915–2005), Peruvian diplomat, historian, lawyer, and writer
- Isabel de Villena (c.1430–1490), the illegitimate child of Enrique de Villena
- Ingrid Villena (born 1990), Chilean lawyer
- Jaime Villena (1897–1975), Spanish footballer
- Javier Villena (born 1966), Spanish retired footballer
- Jose Nicolás Baltasar Fernández de Piérola y Villena (1839–1913), Peruvian politician
- Josh Villena, guitarist of the Spanish band Autotelic
- Luis Antonio de Villena, contemporary Spanish poet and writer
- Luis Flores Villena (born 1964), Peruvian football manager
- Mel Villena, Filipino musician, composer, and musical director
- Pedro Pacheco de Villena (1488–1560), Spanish cardinal
- Rubén Martínez Villena (1899–1934), Cuban writer, lawyer, and revolutionary leader
- Rodolfo Villena Hernández (born 1968), Mexican artisan

== See also ==
- Villena (disambiguation)
- Antonio Arnaiz-Villena, Spanish immunologist
- Eduardo Villena Rey Bridge, arch bridge in Miraflores, Lima
- Luis Villenas (born 2002), Chilean criminal and serial killer
