= Goeken =

Goeken is a surname. Notable people with the surname include:

- John D. Goeken (1930–2010), American telecommunications entrepreneur
- Kathrin Goeken (born 1979), Dutch Paralympic cyclist
- Nancy E. Goeken (fl. 1972–1990), American immunologist
