= Alfredo Corell =

Spanish immunologist and professor

Alfredo Corell Almuzara
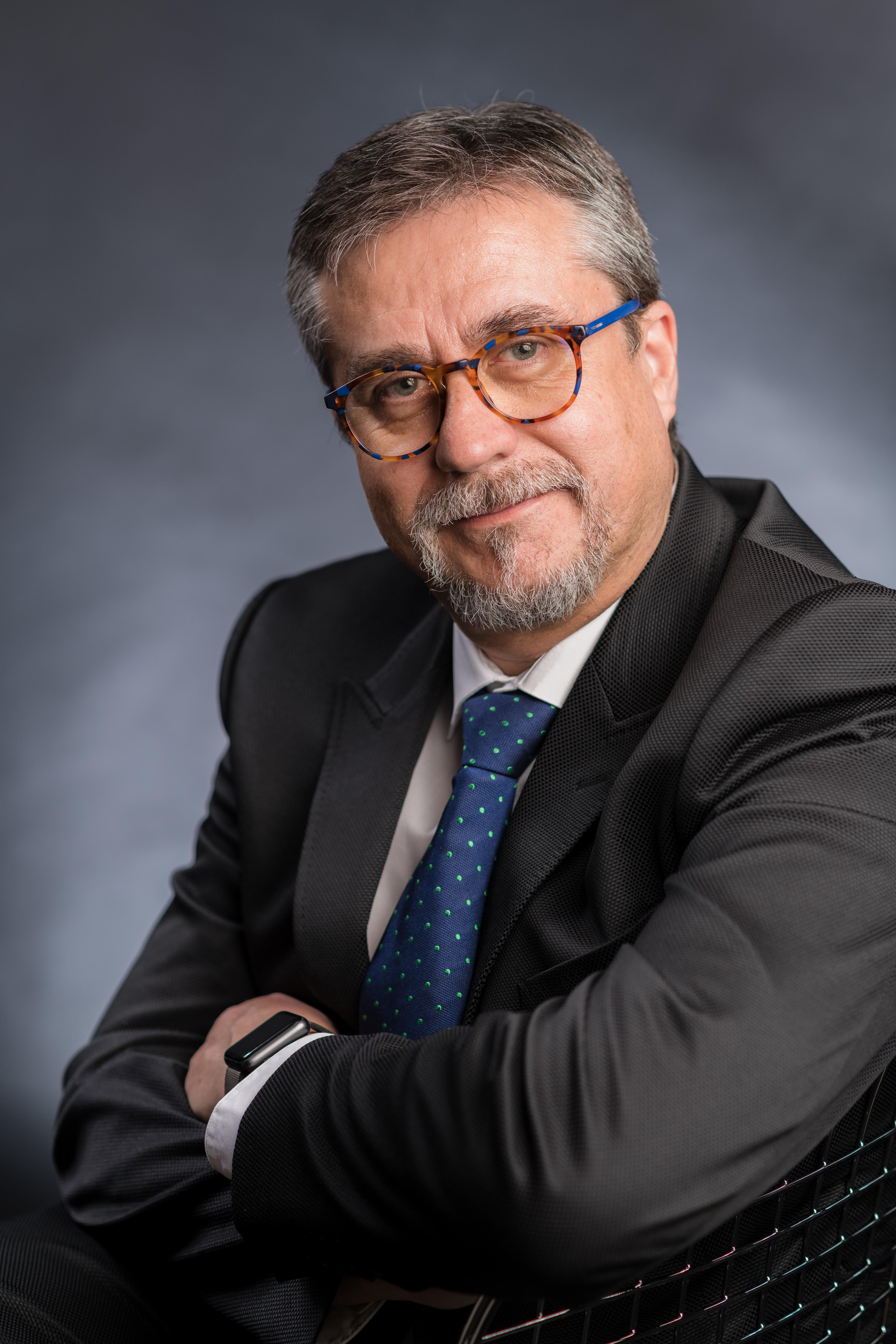
- Born: January 19, 1963 (age 63); Madrid, Spain
- Education: Complutense University of Madrid
- Occupations: Immunologist, university professor, science communicator
- Known for: Immunology research and science communication
- Awards: Spain’s Best University Lecturer (2018) Triángulo Rosa Award (2019) CSIC–BBVA Foundation Award for Scientific Communication (2021)
- Scientific career
- Fields: Immunology, science communication
- Workplaces: University of Seville, University of Valladolid (1999–2022)
- Thesis: Caracterización de un nuevo locus del sistema principal de histocompatibilidad humano: HLA-DRB6 (1992)
- Doctoral advisor: Antonio Arnaiz-Villena

Alfredo Corell Almuzara (born January 19, 1963) is a Spanish immunologist, university professor, science communicator, and a member of the Spanish Society for Immunology. He was named Spain’s Best University Lecturer in 2018 at the 2nd Educa Abanca Awards.

== Career ==
=== Education and research ===
He earned a degree and a doctorate in biology from the Complutense University of Madrid (UCM), specializing in immunology. He completed his doctoral thesis at the Hospital Universitario 12 de Octubre in Madrid. He completed a postdoctoral stay at the Anthony Nolan Foundation in London and spent 18 years doing research and immunological diagnostic work in several hospitals.

His work in the field of immunogenetics and histocompatibility includes the discovery of a pseudogene on human chromosome 6 within the HLA system: HLA-DRB6. He has more than 60 scientific publications in journals, including the New England Journal of Medicine, The Lancet, Immunology Today, and Mucosal Immunology.

=== University teaching and management ===
He began his teaching career as a Boy Scout leader at the age of twenty. In 1999, he became a professor of immunology at the University of Valladolid. His teaching methods include initiatives such as Tus defensas salen de cañas, an informal event he held once a year in a bar in Valladolid to explain different parts of the course material. He became director of the Area of Continuing Education and Teaching Innovation at the University of Valladolid.

In 2018, Corell participated in the seminar Immunology and Immunotherapy: Tools of the 21st Century at the Menéndez Pelayo International University. Corell also trains other educators. In February 2021, Corell became vice president of the non-profit association Paradigmia, a free online training platform for health science students in the Spanish-speaking world. In 2022, he left the University of Valladolid to become a professor of Immunology at the University of Seville, linking his position to the possibility of practicing as a medical specialist at the Virgen del Rocío University Hospital.

=== Science communication ===
Corell is the coordinator of the teaching innovation project Immunomedia, a digital platform involving professors from six Spanish universities and two foreign universities, which has received both national and international recognition. He became popular on social media thanks to his teaching methods, including initiatives such as Inmunopíldoras (“immune pills”), short YouTube videos designed to explain complex aspects of immunology in a simple way.

He has frequently collaborated with news television programs La Sexta Noche and Horizonte: Informe Covid. In 2016, he gave a TEDxValladolid talk on educational innovation.

He leads a project that connects teaching and public outreach with the participation of students from the University of Valladolid. Under his supervision, new original images are contributed to Wikimedia Commons and existing immunology-related Wikipedia pages in Spanish are improved, updated, or created.

== Activism ==
Corell has stated that he faced harassment at his university workplace because he is gay. His commitment to the LGBTQ community has been recognized on several occasions, making him a reference figure for LGBTQ representation in science.

== Awards and recognition ==
In 2017, he won the Award for Best Innovative Initiative for the Immunomedia project at SIMO EDUCACIÓN. The following year, he received the MEDES Award for the promotion of Spanish in science. Also in 2018, Corell was recognized for his teaching abilities as Spain’s Best University Lecturer at the Goya Awards for education.

In 2019, he received the Triángulo Rosa Award from the Fundación Triángulo of Castilla y León. In 2021, he was awarded the ‘Personaje Único’ Prize by El Mundo's Innovadores supplement. That same year, he received the CSIC–BBVA Foundation Award for Scientific Communication for his work during the pandemic. He was also included in Forbes’ 2021 list of the 100 most creative Spaniards in the business world.

In 2023, he received the Baeza Diversa Award in the education and science category for his career in education, research, and science communication, as well as for his activism and defense of LGBTQ+ rights.
