= Malecón de Miraflores =

Park and promenade in Lima

Coordinates: 12.1245°S 77.0383°W

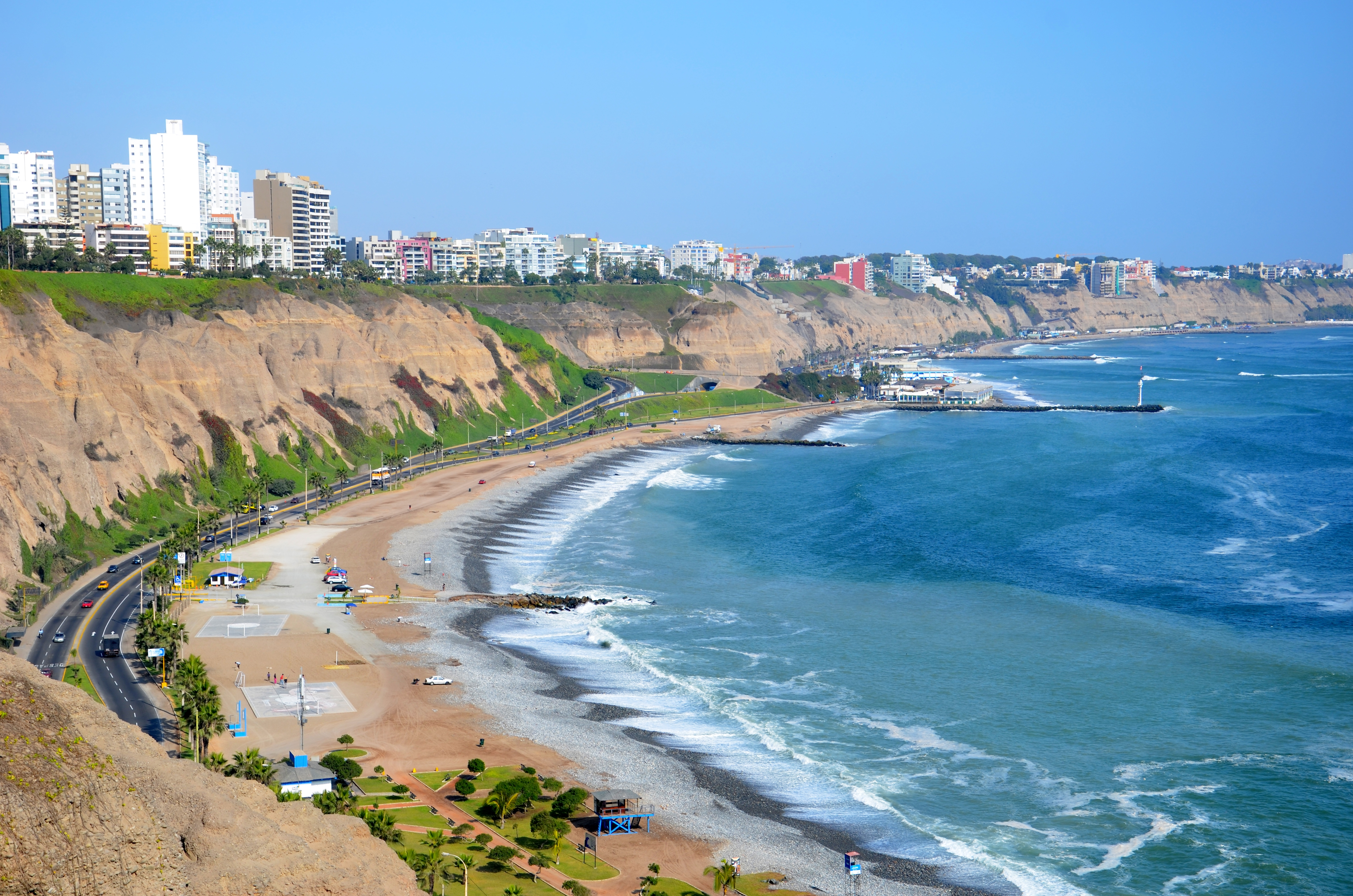
- The malecón and the Costa Verde
- Type: Malecón
- Location: Lima, Peru
- Open: 24 hours

The Malecón de Miraflores is an esplanade in the coast of Lima, Peru. It's a major tourist attraction in the city.

== Overview ==
The malecón crosses the district of Miraflores and is composed of three different sectors: the Malecón de la Marina, the Malecón Cisneros, and the Malecón de la Reserva. Another two malecones, 28 de Julio and Balta, separate the Malecón Cisneros from the other two malecones, being connected by the Puente Villena Rey.

The Malecón de la Reserva, the latter of the three malecones, was designed by Augusto Benavides Diez Canseco and features casonas by Ricardo de Jaxa Malachowski. It is limited to the south by the Bajada de Armendáriz, also known as the Quebrada de Armendáriz.

== Landmarks ==
=== Larcomar ===
The Larcomar is a shopping center in the Miraflores district of Lima, Peru owned by Chilean company Parque Arauco S.A. It was opened on 27 November 1998. It is frequently visited by international tourists, as well as by locals from Miraflores and other parts of Lima. It is located on Avenida Jose Larco, and it is along the cliff next to the ocean (mar means 'sea' in Spanish) thus the name Larcomar. The Larcomar has indoor and outdoor areas, includes a cinema, bowling lanes, a food court, museum, tourist shops, Tony Roma's, T.G.I. Friday's, and Chili's restaurants, book stores, clothing stores, and electronics stores. It is directly across the street from the Marriott hotel.

=== Costa Verde ===
The Costa Verde, is a highway located along the coast of Callao and Lima. It unites the districts of La Punta, La Perla, San Miguel, Magdalena del Mar, San Isidro, Miraflores, Barranco and Chorrillos.

=== Maria Reiche Park ===
Maria Reiche Park
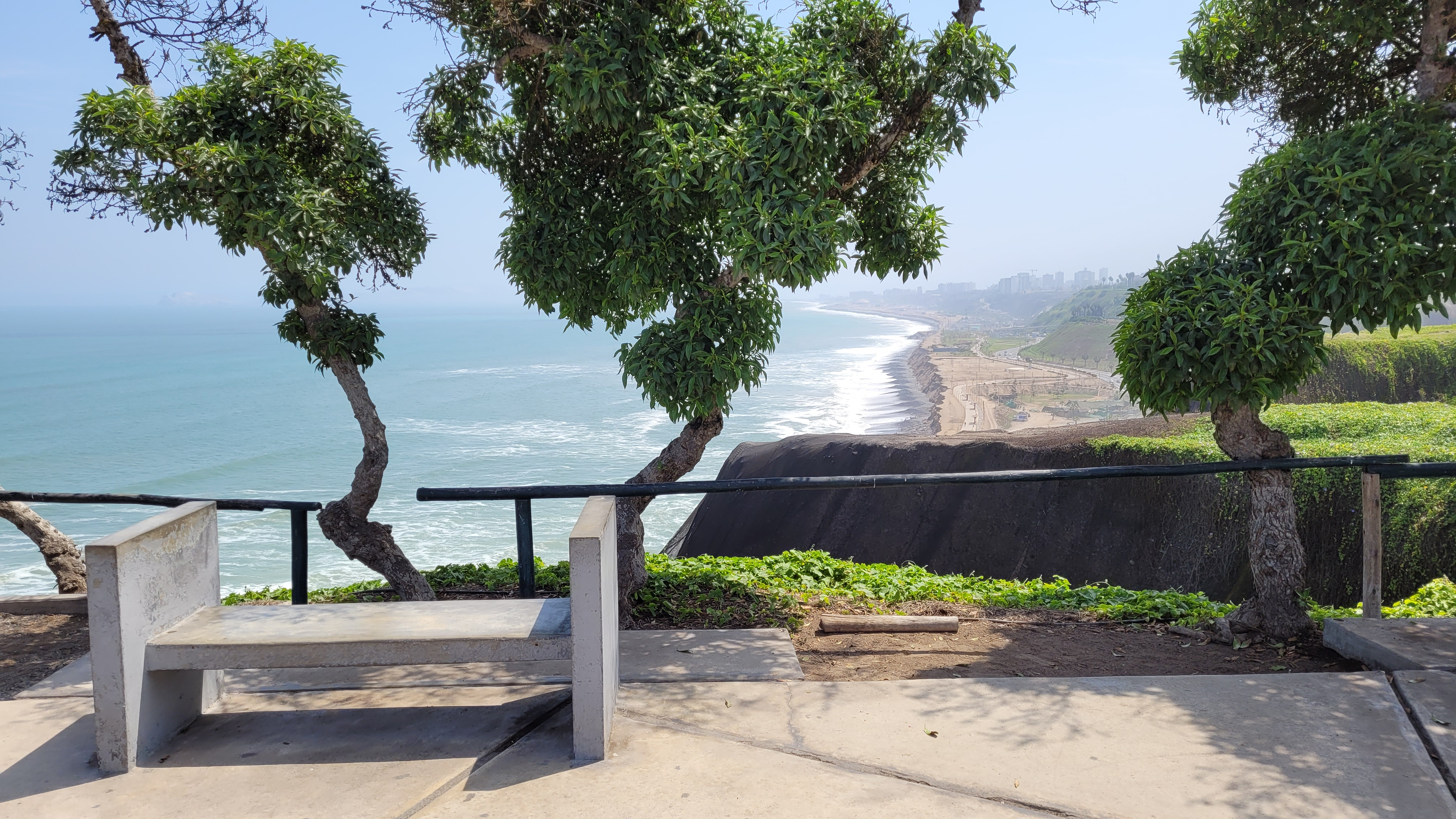
- Type: Public park
- Location: Lima, Peru
- Open: 24 hours

Maria Reiche Park (Spanish: Parque Maria Reiche) is a public park dedicated to the German-Peruvian archaeologist Maria Reiche.

The park, which opened in 1996, also legitimizes several reproductions of the Nazca lines, the main focus of Reiche's research in Peru. Among the Nazca formations that have been reproduced through plants and flowers are the figures of the Monkey, the Cat, the Hands, the Hummingbird and the Flower. These figures are illuminated at night by means of LED chains along the lines with a total length of 1,500 meters of illumination. The figures can best be seen from the neighboring street a little higher up. A commemorative tablet features text by Reiche.

=== Love Park ===
Formally the Alberto Andrade Carmona Park, it's the location of The Kiss, a sculpture by Víctor Delfín.

=== Manuel Bonilla Stadium ===
The Manuel Bonilla Sports Complex is a Peruvian sports center named after Manuel Bonilla Elhart, a child soldier and war hero of the War of the Pacific. This sports complex has a soccer stadium, a coliseum mostly used for volleyball, and a small auditorium.

=== Lugar de la Memoria Museum ===
The Place of Memory, Tolerance and Social Inclusion (Spanish: Lugar de la Memoria, la Tolerancia y la Inclusión Social, LUM) is a museum in Lima, Peru, dedicated to the Peruvian internal conflict of the 1980s and 1990s. It opened in 2015 and is managed by the Ministry of Culture. The LUM seeks to memorialize the victims of the conflict and provide a forum where different viewpoints on the conflict can be discussed.

=== Bicentennial Park ===
Bicentennial Park
- Type: Public park
- Location: Lima, Peru
- Open: 24 hours

Bicentennial Park (Spanish: Parque Bicentenario) is a park opened due to and named after the Bicentennial of Peru. It features andenes built with anti-seismic technology.

=== Eduardo Villena Rey Bridge ===
Eduardo Villena Rey Bridge is an arch bridge in Miraflores, Lima, Peru. It joins the Malecón de Miraflores and crosses the Bajada Balta. The bridge became infamous for its suicides, being a popular spot worldwide for people to take their lives.

== Gallery ==
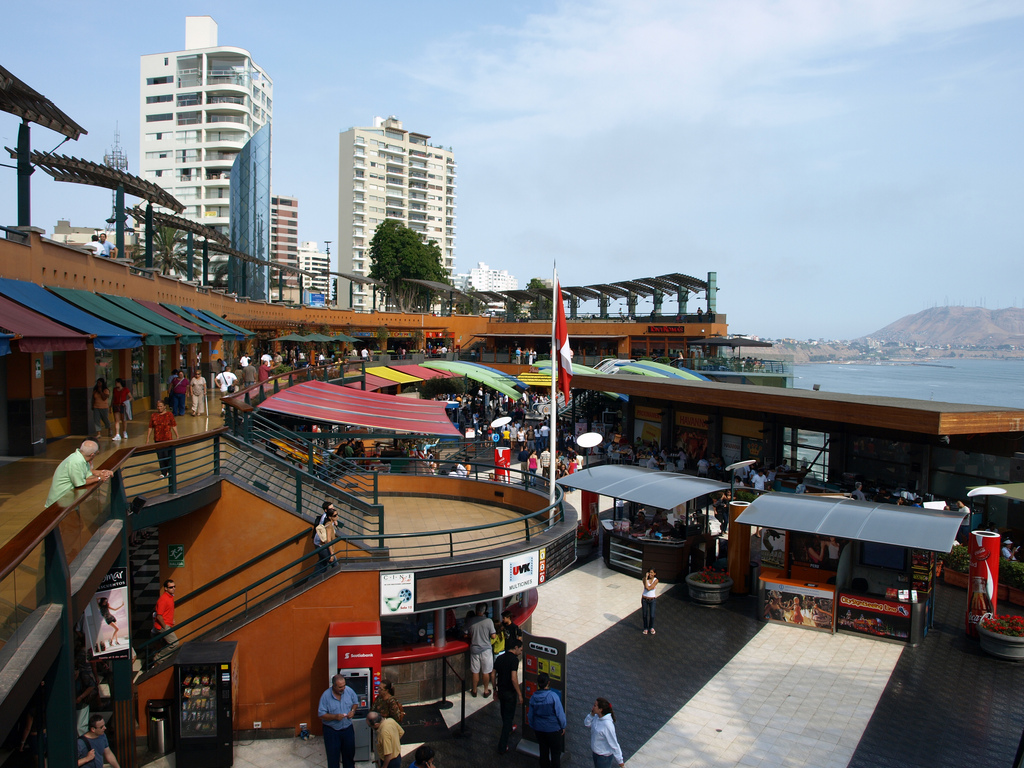
Larcomar in 2014.

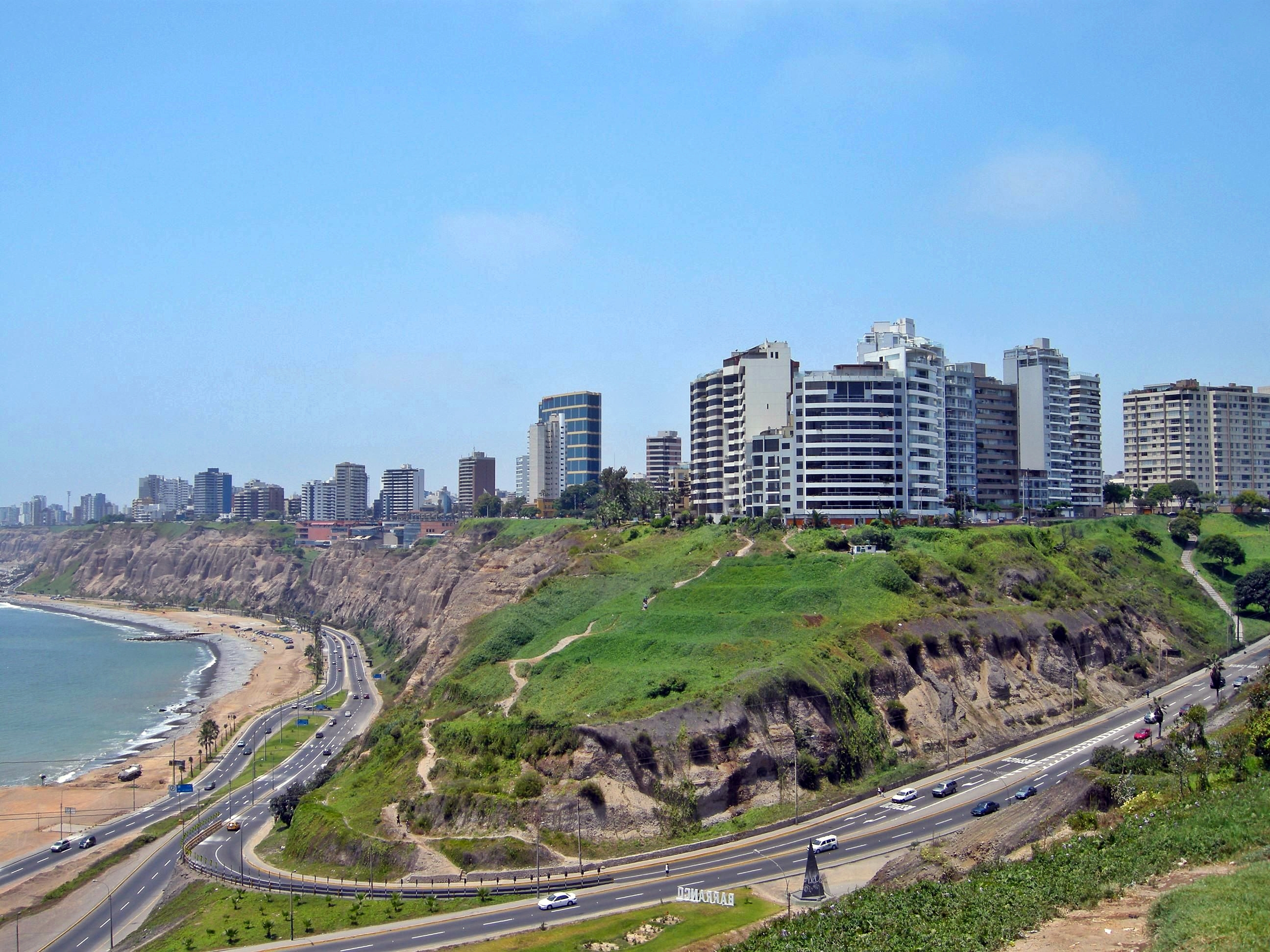
The Costa Verde.

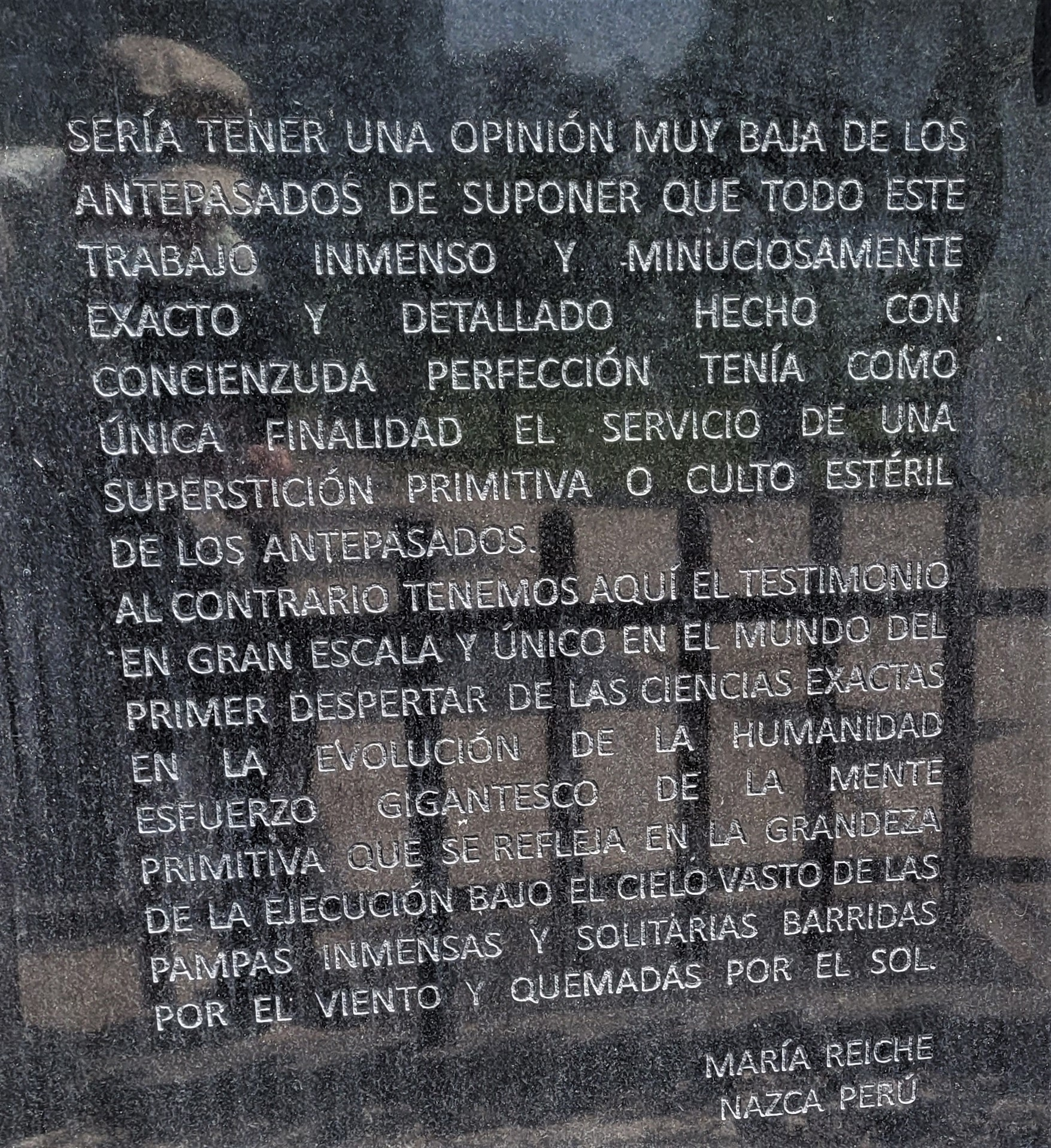
Plaque with text by Reiche at her park.

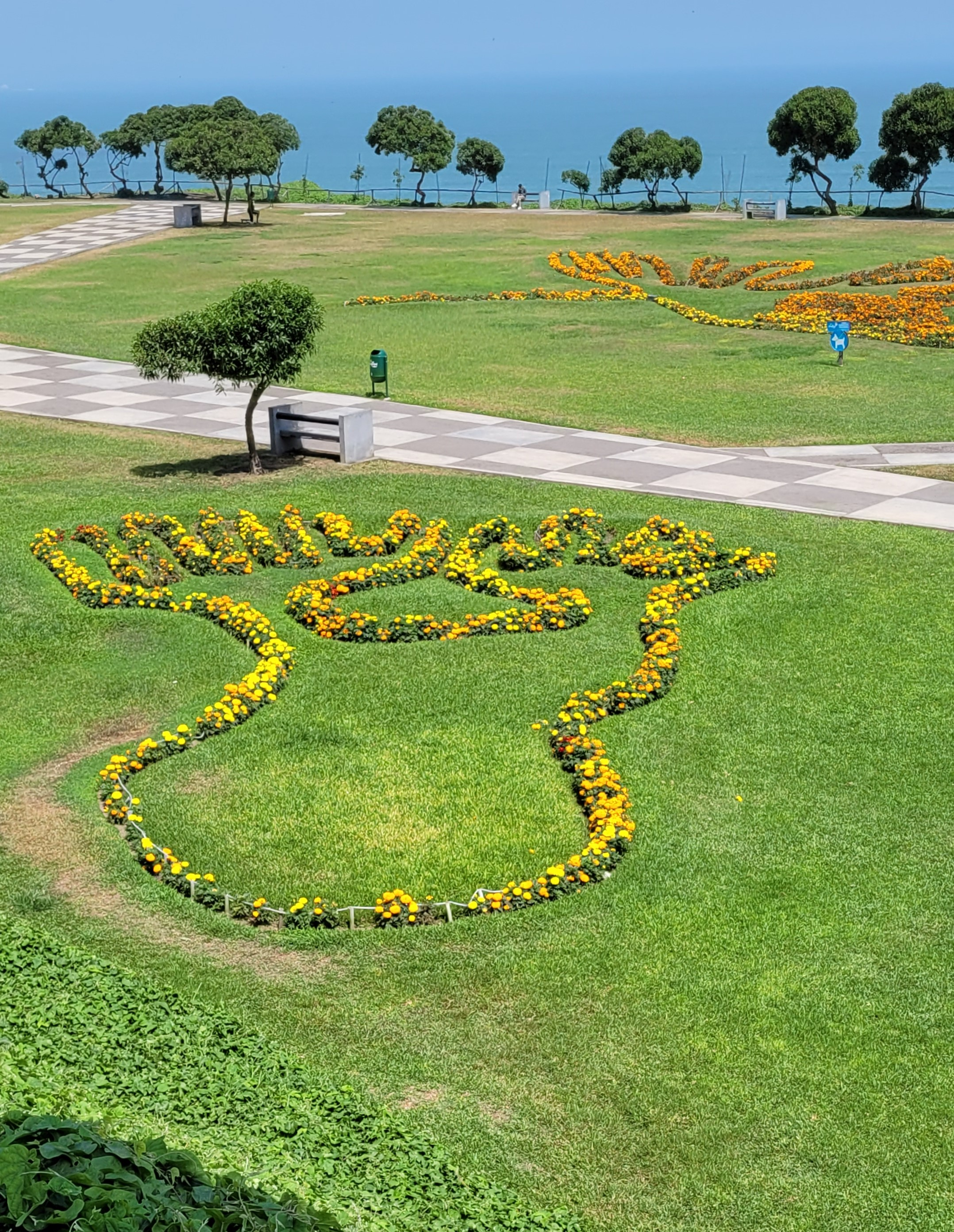
The Hands, located at the same park.

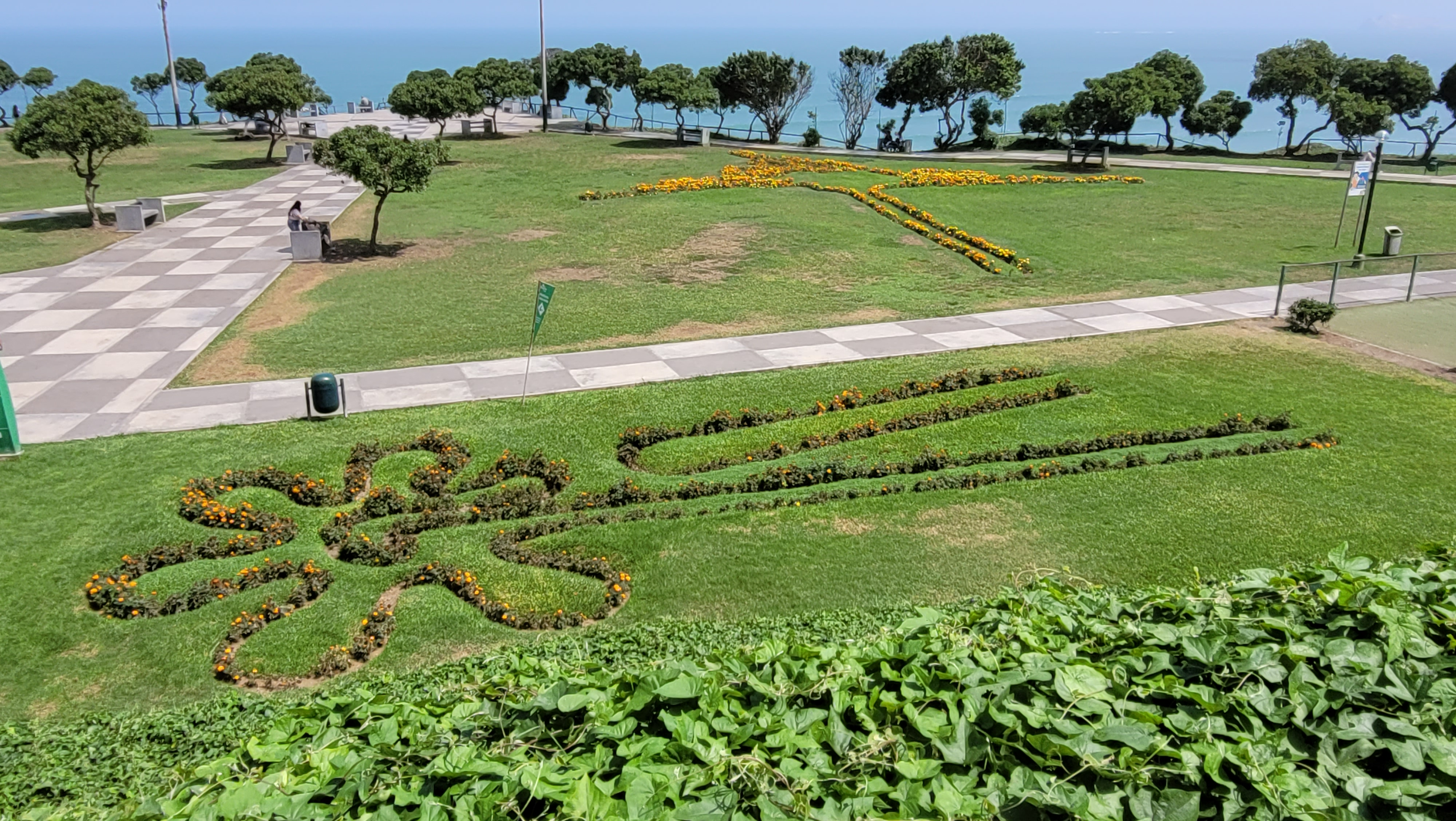
The Flower, ditto.

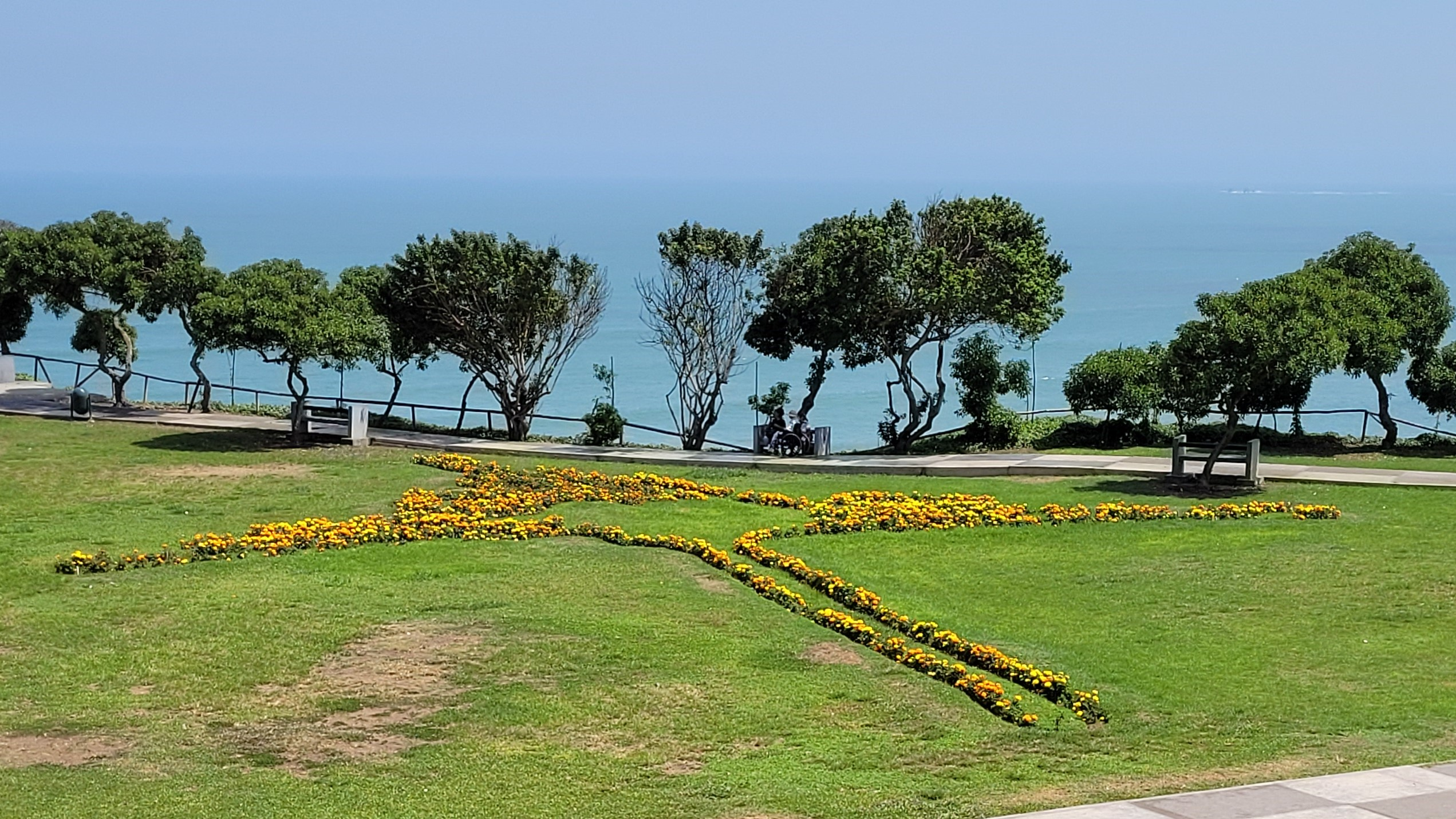
The Hummingbird, ditto.

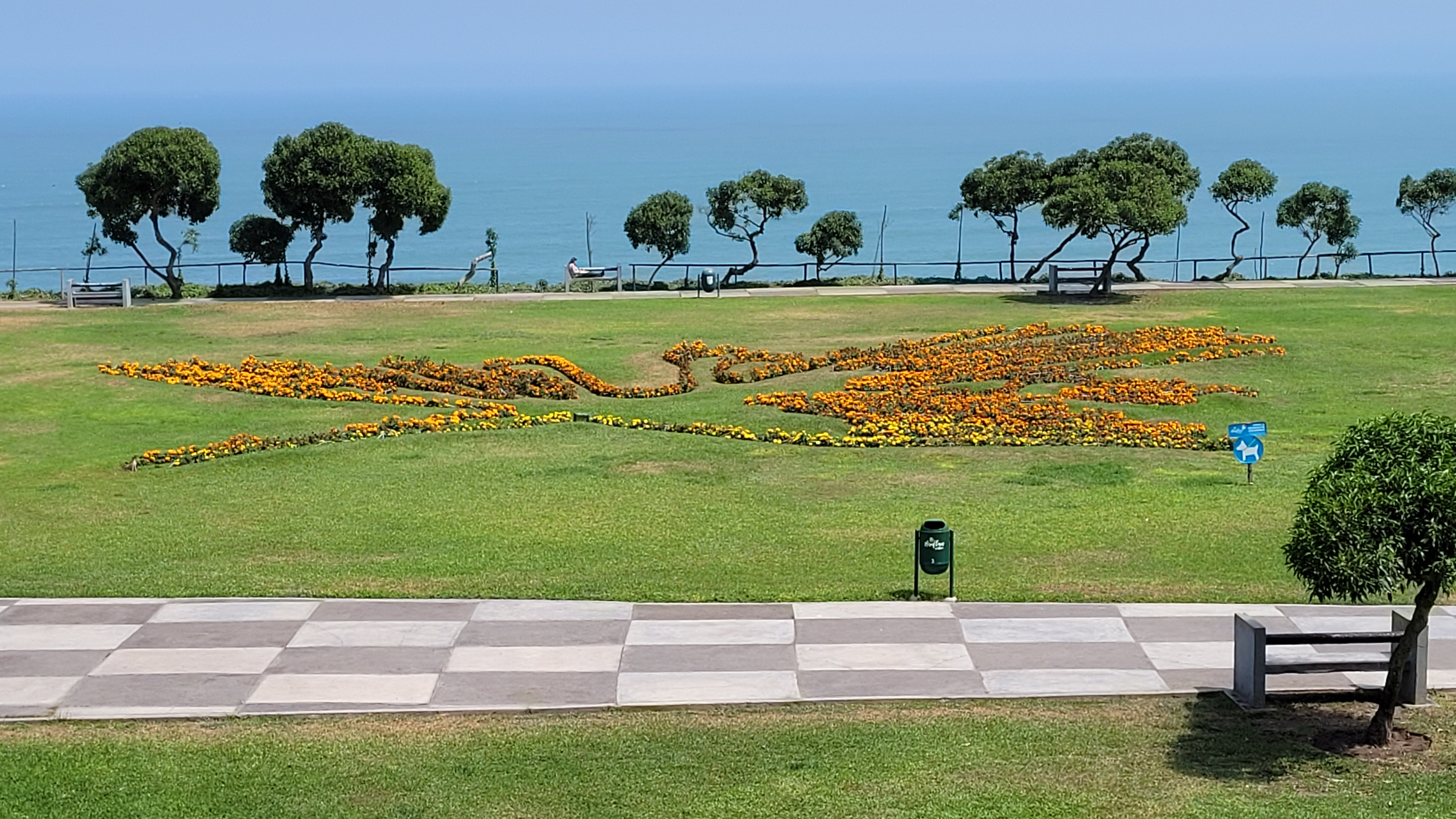
The Condor, ditto.

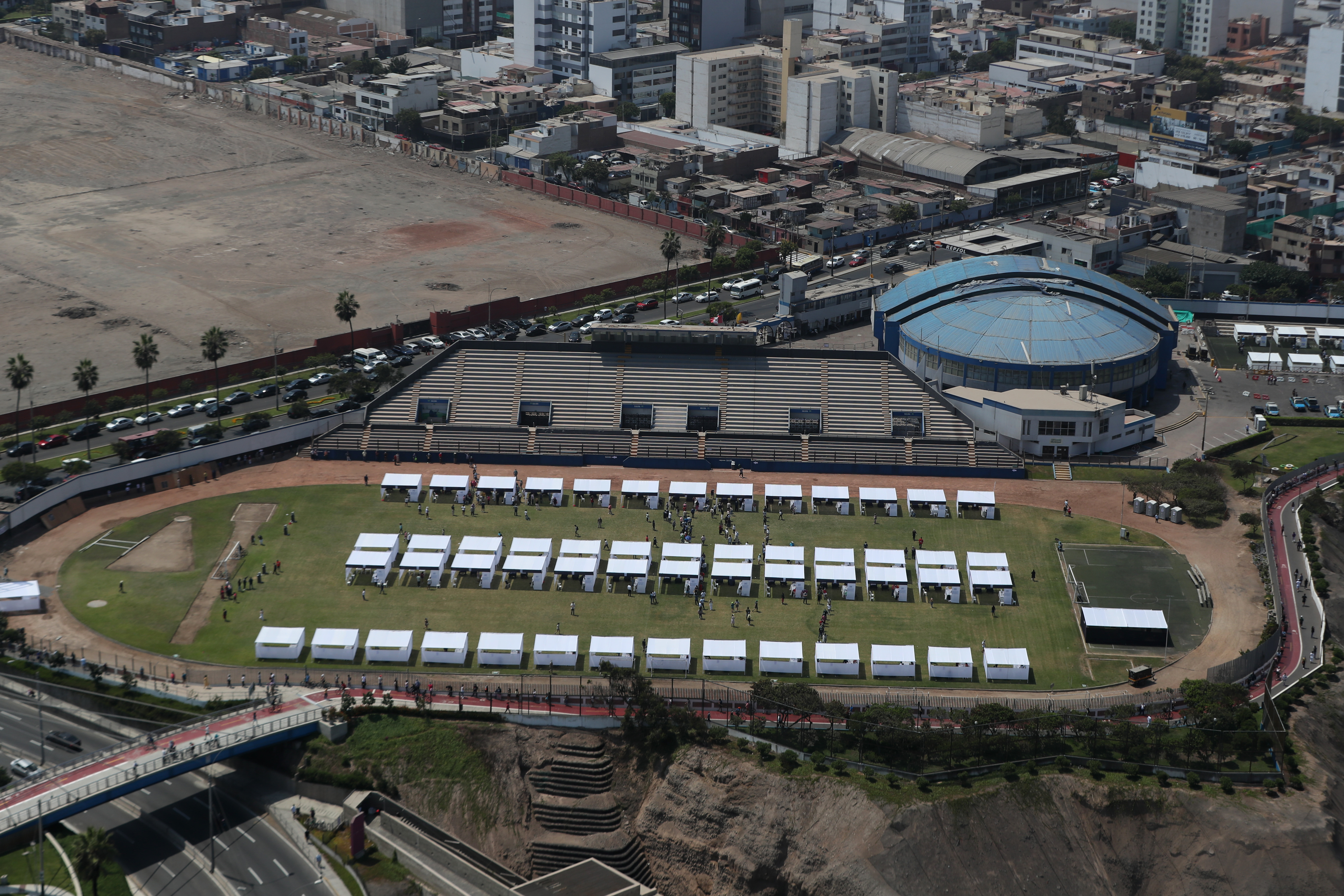
Manuel Bonilla Sports Complex

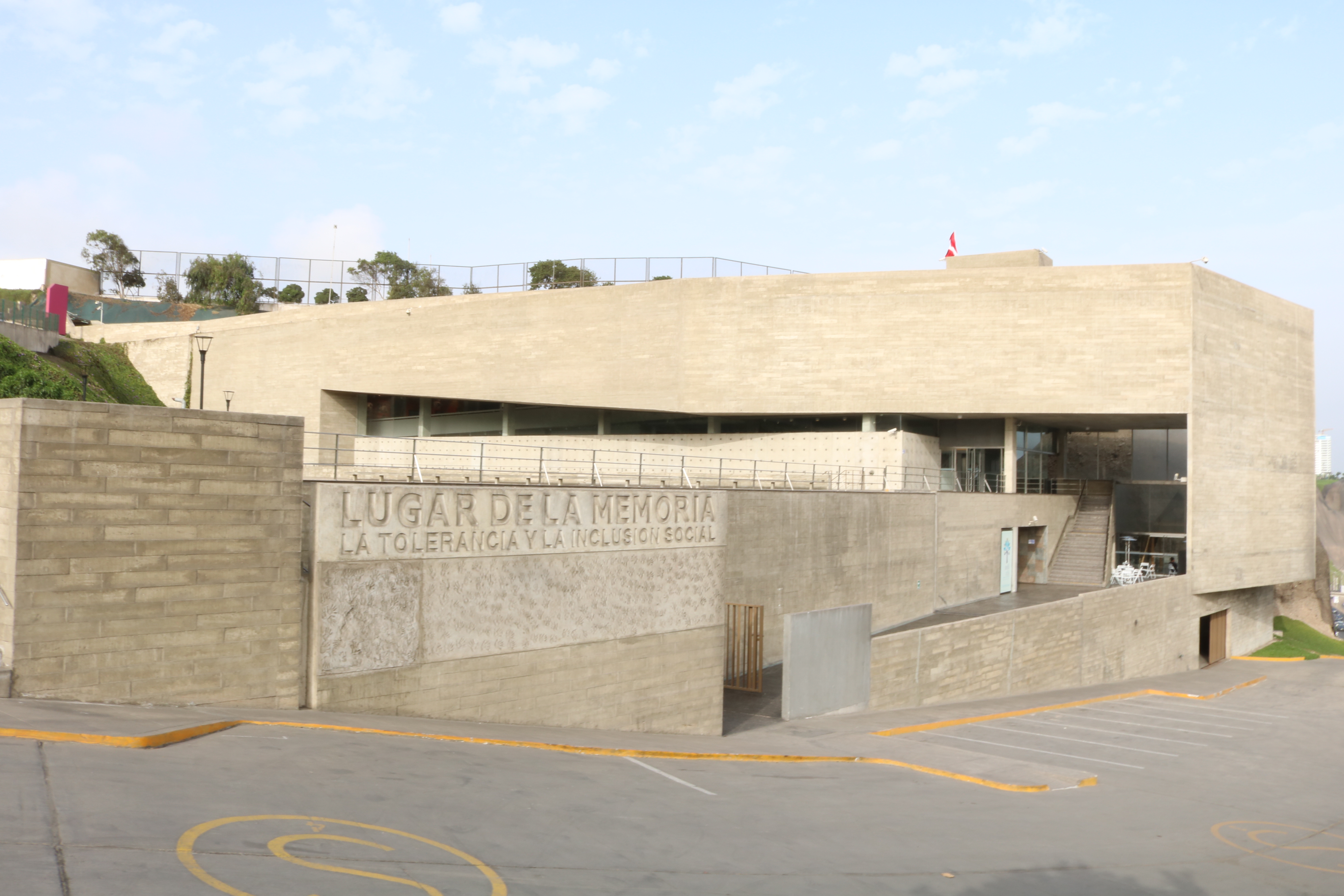
Lugar de la Memoria Museum.

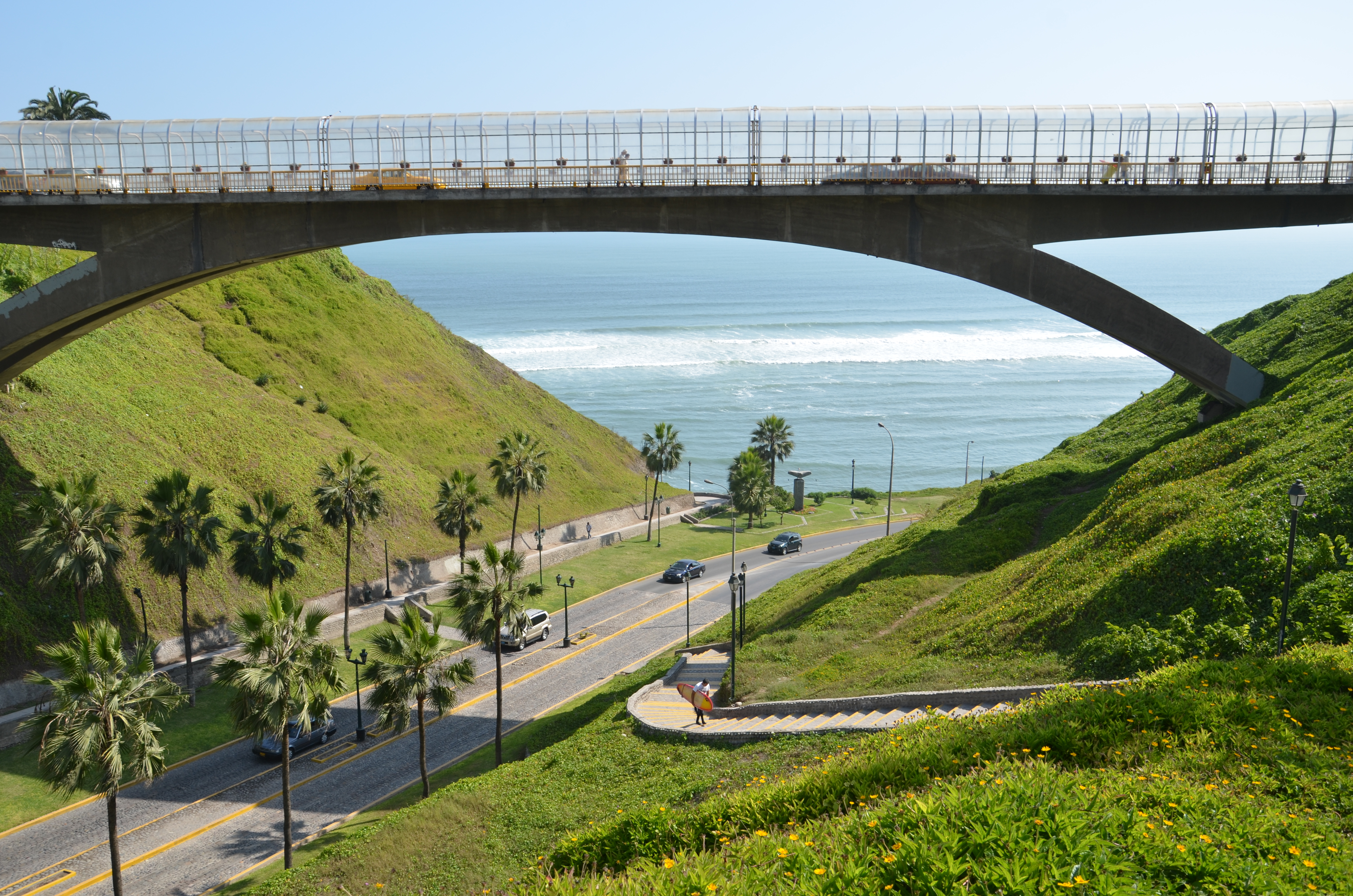
Villena Bridge as seen from the Bajada Balta

== See also ==
- Lima Bay
