= Dianne B. McKay =

American immunologist

- Education: University of California, Berkeley; University of Chicago
- Scientific career
- Fields: Immunology, transplantation
- Workplaces: University of California, San Diego; Scripps Research

Dianne Brenda McKay is an American immunologist who is a professor of immunology and microbiology at Scripps Research. She was president of the American Society of Transplantation from 2018 to 2019.

== Life ==
=== Education ===
McKay earned a B.S. from the University of California, Berkeley in 1978. She completed an M.D. at the University of Chicago in 1983.

=== Career ===
McKay joined the faculty at the Skaggs Graduate School of Chemical and Biological Sciences at Scripps Research in 2001. She was an associate professor of immunology and microbial science from 2001 to 2012. From 2012 to 2018, she was a professor in the department of medicine at the University of California, San Diego. She became a professor of immunology and microbiology at Scripps Research in 2018. She was president of the American Society of Transplantation from 2018 to 2019. She was succeeded by Emily Blumberg.
