= Nancy E. Goeken =

American immunologist

- Education: University of Missouri
- Scientific career
- Fields: Immunology, transplantation
- Workplaces: University of Iowa

Nancy Ellen Goeken is an American immunologist who was a professor in the department of medicine and pathology at the University of Iowa. She served as president of the American Society of Transplantation and the American Society for Histocompatibility and Immunogenetics.

== Life ==
Goeken earned a Ph.D. from the University of Missouri in 1972. Her dissertation is titled, Ontogeny of the Immune Response in the Chicken.

Goeken was a faculty member in the department of medicine and pathology at the Roy J. and Lucille A. Carver College of Medicine at the University of Iowa. From 1986 to 1987, she was president of the American Society of Transplantation. Goeken was president of the American Society for Histocompatibility and Immunogenetics from 1989 to 1990.
