= Villena (disambiguation) =

Villena is a city and municipality in the province of Alicante.

Villena may also refer to:

- Seigneury of Villena, an ancient feudal state of southern Spain
- Marquess of Villena, a hereditary title in the Peerage of Spain
- Villena CF, Spanish football team based in Villena
- Villena (surname), Spanish surname

== See also ==
- Treasure of Villena, a find of gold of the European Bronze Age
