= Antonio Arnaiz-Villena =

Spanish immunologist

Antonio Arnaiz-Villena is a Spanish immunologist noted for his controversial research into the genetic history of ethnic groups and fringe linguistic hypotheses.

== Biography ==
Arnaiz-Villena was president of Spain's National Society of Immunology from 1991 to 1995. He has written more than 300 papers in immunology and human and bird population genetics.

In 1991, he and Alfredo Corell discovered a new HLA class II gene of the DRB family which was later designated as the HLA-DRB6 pseudogene.

He headed the Department of Microbiology I (Immunology) at the Complutense University of Madrid. As of 2026, he is professor emeritus in the same department.

In 2009, he worked at Hospital 12 de Octubre.

In 2010, he was invited to give a lecture in The French Academy of Sciences (College de France).

In 2011, he gave a lecture at The Royal Society (London).

In 2014, he and four other people were given an award on the 35th anniversary of the Law on Transplantations at the Spanish Senate by Queen Sofía of Spain.

== Ethnicity research ==
=== Jews and Palestinians ===
Arnaiz-Villena's research gained much attention following the publication of a paper on the genetic history of Jews and Palestinians, which he co-authored in the journal Human Immunology in 2001. The research results, which concluded that there are strong genetic ties between Israeli Jews and Palestinians, were controversial because of their political implications, as well as what some readers perceived to be political undertones in the article. Following a large number of complaints, the article was withdrawn from the journal and deleted from the scientific archive. Academics who had already received a copy of the journal were urged to "physically remove" the article pages in a move that had no precedent in research publishing. The comments about Arab-Israeli conflicts were described by the journal's editor as "extreme political writing" - a description that was challenged by Arnaiz-Villena. He was subsequently removed from the journal's editorial board.

The journal's decision was met with opposition from several academics. Andrew Goffey, a senior lecturer at Middlesex University, England, observing that "it was conceded that the article had not been removed on the basis of its scientific evidence," failed to find anything offensive in the paper. Several scientists wrote to the publishers to support Arnaiz-Villena and to protest their heavy-handedness. One of them said: "If Arnaiz-Villena had found evidence that Jewish people were genetically very special, instead of ordinary, you can be sure no one would have objected to the phrases he used in his article. This is a very sad business."

=== Greeks and Sub-Saharans ===
Arnaiz-Villena et al. published five scientific articles, where, among other claims, they concluded that the Greek population originates from Sub-Saharan Africa and do not cluster with other Mediterraneans. The explanation they offered is that a large number of Sub-Saharans had migrated to Greece (but not to Crete) during Minoan times, i.e. predating both Classical and Mycenaean Greece. Those conclusions were related to the "Black Athena" debate and became embroiled in disputes between Greek and ethnic Macedonian nationalists.

They cited Dörk et al. for having found a marker on Chromosome 7 that is common to Black Africans and, among Caucasoid populations, is found only in Greeks. Dörk et al. did find an African-type of cystic fibrosis mutation in Greeks, however this mutation was extremely rare; it was detected only in three Greek families. The explanation they offered is quite different from Arnaiz-Villena's. Dörk et al. state: "Historical contacts—for example, under Alexander the Great or during the ancient Minoan civilization—may provide an explanation for the common ancestry of disease mutations in these ethnically diverse populations."

Hajjej et al. claimed to have confirmed the genetic relatedness between Greeks and Sub-Saharans. However they used the same methodology (same gene markers) and same data samples like Arnaiz-Villena et al.

Other authors contradict Arnaiz-Villena's results. In The History and Geography of Human Genes (Princeton, 1994), Sforza, Menozzi and Piazza grouped Greeks with other European and Mediterranean populations based on 120 loci (view MDS plot). Then, Ayub et al. 2003 did the same thing using 182 loci (view dendrogram). Another study was conducted in 2004 at Skopje's University of Ss. Kiril and Metodij, using high-resolution typing of HLA-DRB1 according to Arnaiz-Villena's methodology. Contrary to Arnaiz-Villena's conclusion, no sub-Saharan admixture was detected in the Greek sample.

In a sample of 125 Greeks from Thessaloniki and Sarakatsani, 2 Asian-specific mtDNA sequences (M and D) were detected (1.6%). No sub-Saharan African genes were observed in this population, therefore, non-Caucasoid maternal ancestry in Greece is very low, as elsewhere in Europe. Additionally, in a sample of 366 Greeks from thirteen locations in continental Greece, Crete, Lesvos and Chios, a single African haplogroup A Y Chromosome was found (0.3%). This marks the only instance to date of sub-Saharan DNA being discovered in Greece. In another sample of 42 Greeks, one sequence of the Siberian Tat-C haplogroup turned up, while other studies with larger sample populations have failed to detect this paternal marker in the Greek gene pool and while its frequencies are actually much higher in Scandinavian and Slavic populations. Also, a paper has detected clades of haplogroups J and E3b that were likely not part of pre-historic migrations into Europe, but rather spread by later historical movements. Greeks possess none of the lineages denoting North African ancestry within the last 5000 years and have only 2% (3/148) of the marker J-M267, which may reflect more recent Middle Eastern admixture.

Jobling et al., in their genetics textbook "Human Evolutionary Genetics: Origins, Peoples & Disease", state that Arnaiz-Villena's conclusions on the Sub-Saharan origin of Greeks is an example of arbitrary interpretation and that the methodology used is not appropriate for this kind of research. Karatzios C. et al. made a systematic review of genetics and historical documents, showing great flaws in Arnaiz-Villena's methodology and theory on the Greeks/Sub-Saharan genetic relationship.

Three respected geneticists, Luca Cavalli-Sforza, Alberto Piazza and Neil Risch, criticised Arnaiz-Villena's methodology. They stated that "Using results from the analysis of a single marker, particularly one likely to have undergone selection, for the purpose of reconstructing genealogies is unreliable and unacceptable practice in population genetics. The limitations are made evident by the authors' extraordinary observations that Greeks are very similar to Ethiopians and east Africans but very distant from other south Europeans; and that the Japanese are nearly identical to west and south Africans. It is surprising that the authors were not puzzled by these anomalous results, which contradict history, geography, anthropology and all prior population-genetic studies of these groups." Arnaiz-Villena et al. countered this criticism in a response, stating "single-locus studies, whether using HLA or other markers, are common in this field and are regularly published in the specialist literature".

A 2017 archaeogenetic study concluded concerning the origin of both the Minoans and Mycenaeans, that:

Other proposed migrations, such as settlement by Egyptian or Phoenician colonists are not discernible in our data, as there is no measurable Levantine or African influence in the Minoans and Myceneans, thus rejecting the hypothesis that the cultures of the Aegean were seeded by migrants from the old civilizations of these regions.

The other proposed migrations that are mentioned and disproved by the paper pertain to Black Athena's positions that Arnaiz-Villena also tried to support with his work.

=== Meso-Americans ===
Arnaiz-Villena also co-authored a paper on the origins of Mesoamerican populations, which made claims concerning multi-ethnic origins of pre-Columbian populations in the area. The paper argued that the peopling of the Americas "was probably more complex than postulated by Greenberg and others (three peopling waves)", but noted that "Meso and South American Amerindians tend to remain isolated in the Neighbor-Joining, correspondence and plane genetic distance analyses."

=== Ethnic Macedonians ===
Arnaiz-Villena et al. published two scientific articles, where, among other claims, they concluded that ethnic Macedonians are closely related to Mediterraneans, showing the closest genetic relatedness with Cretan Greeks but not with other Greeks.

=== Fringe linguistic theories ===
Arnaiz-Villena and Jorge Alonso-Garcia claim to have used Basque to decipher many of the ancient languages of the Mediterranean and Middle East which are known to be unrelated to Basque, including Egyptian, Hittite, Sumerian, Hurrian, Ugaritic, Akkadian/Babylonian, Elamite, and Phoenician, all of which they claim have been misidentified and mistranslated by the world's linguists and epigraphers for a century. They characterize mainstream research as "science fiction stories". Arnaiz-Villena's Egyptian translations, for example, include the cartouche of the bilingual Rosseta Stone in which Champollion identified the name of Ptolemy; in Arnaiz-Villena's interpretation it does not include that name, so that it is actually Arnaiz-Villena who deserves credit for deciphering the hieroglyphs. Similarly, in Arnaiz-Villena's interpretation, the Code of Hammurabi contains "no hint of laws" but is a Basque funerary text, and his purported Basque material proper includes the Iruña-Veleia graffiti, which had been identified as modern forgeries by a multidisciplinary team, despite some isolated attempts to vindicate the Basque words of the inscriptions made by other persons, half a year before his decipherment was published. They also claim to be able to read poorly attested languages such as Etruscan, Iberian, Tartessian, Guanche, and Minoan, which no one else has been able to decipher with any certainty. They posit that these are all part of a "Usko-Mediterranean" branch of the speculative Dené–Caucasian language family, which they extend to include the Berber languages of North Africa. This thesis flatly contradicts basic Egyptological, Sumerian, Semitic, Indo-European, and Mesoamerican scholarship. Phoenician, Akkadian/Babylonian, Ugaritic, and Eblaite, for example, are transparently Semitic languages, and Arnaiz-Villena excludes the rest of the Semitic languages from his family; Egyptian and Berber along with Semitic have been demonstrated to be Afro-Asiatic, and generations of linguists have been unable to find a connection between Berber and Basque or Afro-Asiatic and Basque; and Hittite is widely acclaimed as a key in the reconstruction of Proto-Indo-European, which Arnaiz-Villena acknowledges is completely unrelated to Basque.

De Hoz says their work "lacks the slightest value and is contrary not just to the scientific method but to common sense", and "is an unmitigated disaster which in principle should not be reviewed", but that he does so because it was published using public funds by the respected Editorial Complutense, which might give it undeserved credibility. He calls this a "crime" against legitimate research which has gone unpublished for lack of funds. Pichler likewise describes the "decipherment" of the Canary Island inscriptions as "comic", pointing out that Arnaiz-Villena "translated" an inscription of the alphabet as if it formed words (starting with "fire deceased earth prayer" in Basque), and also found it amazing that the university would publish his books. The "Basque" words he translated into are themselves dubious, including some that are modern neologisms and some that are loanwords from Romance languages, such as bake (from Latin pace "peace"), and which therefore can say nothing about ancient Basque connections. Lakarra, taking as a sample the list of 32 items entitled "Lenguaje religioso-funerario de los pueblos mediterráneos", provided by Arnaiz-Villena and Alonso as evidence for their decipherment, calculates that of the alleged Basque roots proposed by Arnaiz-Villena and Alonso, 85% are faulty or spurious, sometimes "verging on the clumsiest falsification", while even the remaining 15% is unclear.

== Suspension and litigation ==
In 2002, Arnaiz-Villena was suspended without pay from the Hospital 12 de Octubre after being charged with embezzlement of funds thought to exceed EUR 300,000. An audit of the section that Arnaiz directed found accounting irregularities of at least EUR 861,000. Arnaiz-Villena was also accused of the "purchase of products not used in his department's health care activities; purchase of hospital products used in health care activities but in quantities much greater than needed; falsification of statistical data apparently to justify purchases; humiliating treatment of department staff; delay in health care activities; and transfer of department products to the university." In March 2003, judges canceled his suspension, ruling it violated the presumption of innocence, and permitting him to return to his post. However, in November 2003 the Court of Administrative Litigation No. 8 of Madrid confirmed the non-criminal charges and sentenced him to 33 months of suspension from work without pay. It did not consider the charge of embezzlement, which was still pending.

Arnaiz-Villena denied all charges against him, saying he was the victim of a "public lynching". Both the hospital and the university stated that the charges had nothing to do with the Human Immunology affair. Arnaiz-Villena said he was prepared to "go to Strasbourg" to prove his innocence. Though suspended from the hospital, he continued his work at the university. Subsequently, Arnaiz-Villena was absolved and received a favorable decision from a three-body Judge commission of the Madrid Supreme Court and he continues to serve in the same positions he held before the onset of the accusations against him.
