= American Journal of Transplantation =

- Discipline: Organ transplantation
- Language: English
- Edited by: Sandy Feng

Publication details
- History: 2001–present
- Publisher: Elsevier on behalf of the American Society of Transplant Surgeons and the American Society of Transplantation (United States)
- Frequency: Monthly
- Impact factor: 7.163 (2018)

Standard abbreviations
- ISO 4: Am. J. Transplant.

Indexing
- CODEN: AJTMBR
- ISSN: 1600-6135 (print); 1600-6143 (web)
- LCCN: 2001229844
- OCLC no.: 47727849

Links
- Journal homepage; Journal page at publisher's website; Online access; Online archive

The American Journal of Transplantation is a monthly peer-reviewed medical journal published by Elsevier on behalf of the American Society of Transplant Surgeons and the American Society of Transplantation. It covers research on all aspects of organ transplantation. Each issue offers continuing medical education in the form of its Images in Transplantation feature, a case-based approach.

== History ==
The journal was established in 2001 with Philip F. Halloran (University of Alberta) as its first editor-in-chief. In 2010, he was succeeded by Allan D. Kirk (Duke University).

From 2011 to 2015, a shorter, Czech language-version of the journal was published quarterly, each issue containing five articles originally published in the American Journal of Transplantation. The local editor was Ondrej Viklický (Institute for Clinical and Experimental Medicine, Prague).

In 2020, Sandy Feng became the journal's new editor-in-chief.

== Supplements ==
The journal publishes a yearly supplement, the Organ Procurement and Transplantation Network and Scientific Registry of Transplant Recipients Annual Data Report, which is a collection of data about transplant patients. Another annual supplement is the collected abstracts submitted to the American Transplant Congress. A third annual supplement is the ASTS State of the Art Winter Symposium supplement, which is published in January and contains the schedule, abstracts, and other information about the symposium. As of 2025, the journal has published three Infectious Diseases Guidelines supplements (2004, 2009, 2013), followed by a fourth edition that has been published by Clinical Transplantation in 2019.

== Abstracting and indexing ==
The journal is abstracted and indexed in:

- Academic Search
- Elsevier BIOBASE
- CAB Abstracts
- CAB Health
- CABDirect
- Chemical Abstracts Service
- CSA Biological Sciences Database
- CSA Environmental Sciences & Pollution Management Database
- Current Contents/Clinical Medicine
- EMBASE
- Health Economic Evaluations Database
- Dietary Supplements
- Index Medicus/MEDLINE/PubMed
- Science Citation Index Expanded
- Veterinary Bulletin

According to the Journal Citation Reports, the journal has a 2017 impact factor of 6.493, ranking it second out of 25 journals in the category "Transplantation" and sixth out of 200 journals in the category "Surgery". As of 2024, the Journal Impact Factor has been 8.9, ranking it in the first quartile of the category "Transplantations".
