= American Society for Histocompatibility and Immunogenetics =

American scientific society

- American Society for Histocompatibility and Immunogenetics
- Formation: 1972
- Type: Scientific society
- Location: 5051 Route 42, Unit 4 PMB 1072, Turnersville, NJ 08012
- President: Anne Halpin
- Website: www.ashi-hla.org

The American Society for Histocompatibility and Immunogenetics (ASHI) is an American scientific society that was established in 1972. It is responsible for accrediting HLA typing laboratories internationally to maintain the quality standards for histocompatibility testing between donors and recipients, with UNOS and NMDP utilizing its service to inspect and determine whether laboratories complied to industrial practices. They also published the first CWD (common and well documented) allele list, encouraging researchers to compare genetic differences between populations. The society sponsors the American College of Histocompatibility and Immunogenetics (formerly the American College of Histocompatibility and Immunogenetics), and offers 5 levels of certification. The medical journal Human Immunology is published by Elsevier on behalf of the society.

== Awards ==
The society also sponsors several awards in recognition of accomplishments and contributions to the field of histocompatibility and immunogenetics, including:

- Bernard Amos Distinguished Scientist Award
- Distinguished Service Award
- J. Marilyn MacQueen Rising Star Award (formerly ASHI/SEOPF J. Marilyn MacQueen Award)
- Outstanding Technologist Award
- Paul I. Terasaki Clinical Science Award
- Rose Payne Award
- Scholar Awards & International Scholar Award
- Travel Fund Award
- Young Investigator Awards
