= Allan Kirk =

Allan Douglas Kirk is an American surgeon who is chairman of the department of surgery in the Duke University School of Medicine and surgeon-in-chief for Duke University Health System. He is the David C. Sabiston Jr. Professor of Surgery and a professor of immunology and pediatrics. He served as editor-in-chief for the American Journal of Transplantation from 2010 through 2020, and is now Editor Emeritus.

Kirk is an American transplant surgeon and physician, specializing in kidney and pancreas transplantation. He is internationally recognized for work in transplant immunology, serving as the inaugural chief of the Transplantation Branch for the National Institute of Diabetes and Digestive and Kidney Diseases (NIDDK) and principal investigator for multiple clinical trials, including the first-in-man experience with novel immunosuppressive agents. Kirk pioneered the use of costimulation pathway blockade to prevent organ rejection in transplant patients.

== Education, military service, and previous appointments ==
Kirk received his medical degree from the Duke University School of Medicine in 1987 and a PhD in immunology at Duke in 1992. He went on to complete his general surgery residency at Duke in 1995, followed by an organ transplant fellowship at the University of Wisconsin–Madison in 1997.

From 1983 to 2001, he served in the United States Navy, reaching the rank of commander and principal investigator at the Naval Medical Research Center. He was senior investigator and chief of the Transplantation Branch for the NIDDK from 2001 to 2007. During that time, he also served as an attending transplant surgeon at Walter Reed Army Medical Center in Washington, D.C. In 2007, he joined Emory University as professor and vice chair for surgical research. Since 2014, he has been in his current position at Duke, and, since 2021, as Chair of the Board at Clinetic.

== Scientific contributions ==
Kirk has made significant contributions to transplantation over the past 20 years, specifically in the areas of novel immune management and characterization of organ transplant recipients. These contributions have primarily been in the development and use of novel immunosuppressive agents and regimens, and in novel approaches toward immune monitoring in transplant recipients.

Kirk directs the Laboratory of Immune Management in the Department of Surgery at Duke University School of Medicine. His research focuses on the following three interrelated areas: 1) the use of costimulation blockade therapy to prevent organ rejection in transplant recipients, 2) antibody depletion therapies to condition patient immune systems for transplant, and 3) understanding how immunosuppressive agents can affect the immune system based on immune exhaustion, memory, and senescence.

== Professional memberships and awards ==
In recognition for his scientific contributions, Kirk has been elected into professional societies and has been honored with awards over the years, a few of which are listed below:

=== Societies ===
- Elected Member of the National Academy of Medicine
- Elected Member of the Association of American Physicians
- Elected Member of the American Society of Clinical Investigation
- Elected Member of the American Society of Transplant Surgeons
- Elected Member of the American Society of Transplantation
- Fellow of the American College of Surgeons

=== Honors ===
- David C. Sabiston, Jr. Distinguished Professorship, Duke University
- Distinguished Alumnus Award, Duke Medical Alumni Association
- NIH 2016 Distinguished Clinical Research Scholar and Educator in Residence
- NIH Clinical Center Bench to Bedside Award
- Consumers Research Council of America “America's Top Surgeons”
