= American Society of Transplantation =

The American Society of Transplantation (AST) is an international organization of over 4,000 transplant professionals dedicated to advancing the field of transplantation through the promotion of research, education, advocacy, organ donation, and service to the community through a lens of equity and inclusion. It is the largest professional transplantation society in North America.

== History ==
The history of the AST begins in 1981, when the charter members of the society met at the annual meeting of the American Society of Nephrology (ASN). It was at this meeting where a new society, known as the American Society of Transplant Physicians (ASTP), was created to meet the professional needs of a burgeoning group of transplant physicians. The ASTP was founded on May 10, 1982, with membership open to physicians and certain other health professionals who shared an interest in transplantation medicine and biology. In 1998, the ASTP changed its name to the American Society of Transplantation (AST) and opened its membership to additional health professionals working in the area of transplantation.

== Meetings and Education ==
The society's first annual meeting (as the ASTP) took place on June 3, 1982, in Chicago. In 2000, the AST returned to Chicago in conjunction with the American Society of Transplant Surgeons (ASTS) and held the first American Transplant Congress (ATC). Since that time, the ATC has met annually in a variety of North American cities, and is currently the largest annual meeting of transplant professionals.

The first Fellows Symposium on Transplant Medicine was held July 27–28, 1996 in St. Louis, Missouri. Renamed the Fellows Symposium on Transplantation in 2015, this meeting gives clinical fellows and residents, surgical fellows, research fellows, pharmacists, and other trainees the opportunity to participate in specialized scientific sessions and meet one-on-one with senior transplant specialists.

The first AST Winter Symposium was held February 13–17, 1997, in Phoenix, Arizona. The AST's winter meeting has been designated as the Cutting Edge of Transplantation (CEOT) meeting.

The AST held its first Transplant Patient Summit in October 2017. The meeting was held in Washington, DC and was the society's first patient-focused meeting. The society later changed the name of this summit to the Transplant Community Summit. The second was held during the Transplant Games of America in August 2018.

In 2007, the Transplant Nephrology Core Curriculum (TNCC) was launched as an online program provided jointly by the ASN and the AST. The TNCC focuses on key information needed to prepare for the American Board of Internal Medicine Nephrology Board Certification and Maintenance of Certification examinations.

In 2011, the AST launched the Timely Topics in Transplantation (T3) webinar series. The T3 webinars can be viewed live or on-demand, and span all transplant topics.

In 2017, the AST launched the Comprehensive Trainee Curriculum, an educational resource that helps young transplant professional expand their broad understanding of the field.

The Society also launched its Transplant in 10 resource in 2017. Transplant in 10 aims to educate busy transplant professionals with videos that are 10 minutes or less.

== Communities of Practice (COPs) ==
The AST Communities of Practice (COPs) are specialty-area focused groups within the larger society. The AST currently has 16 COPs:

- Advanced Practice Providers
- Community of Basic Scientists
- Infectious Disease
- Kidney Pancreas
- Live Donor
- Liver and Intestinal
- Pediatric
- Psychosocial and Ethics
- Recovery and Preservation
- Thoracic and Critical Care
- Trainee and Young Faculty
- Transplant Administration and Quality Management
- Transplant Diagnostics
- Transplant Pharmacy
- Transplant Regenerative Medicine
- Women's Health

== Publications ==
The American Journal of Transplantation is the joint monthly peer-reviewed medical journal of the AST and ASTS, published by Wiley-Blackwell.

Additional publications:

- AST Handbook of Transplant Infections
- AST Primer on Transplantation, 3rd Edition
- Special Issue: The American Society of Transplantation Infectious Diseases Guidelines, 3rd Edition
- Transplant Immunology

== Presidents ==
- 2026-2027: Nicole Turgeon, MD
- 2025-2026: David Foley, MD
- 2024-2025: Jon Kobashigawa, MD
- 2023-2024: Josh Levitsky, MD
- 2022-2023: Deepali Kumar, MD
- 2021-2022: John Gill, MD
- 2020-2021: Richard Formica, MD
- 2019-2020: Emily Blumberg
- 2018-2019: Dianne B. McKay
- 2017-2018: Ronald Gill, PhD
- 2016-2017: Anil Chandraker, MD, FRCP, FAST
- 2015-2016: James S. Allan, MD, MBA, FAST
- 2014-2015: Kenneth A. Newell, MD, PhD, FAST
- 2013–2014: Daniel R. Salomon, MD
- 2012–2013: Roslyn B. Mannon, MD, FAST
- 2011–2012: Robert S. Gaston, MD, FAST
- 2010–2011: Maryl Johnson, MD, FAST
- 2009–2010: Joren C. Madsen, MD, DPhil
- 2008–2009: Barbara Murphy, MD
- 2007–2008: Flavio Vincenti, MD
- 2006–2007: Jeffrey S. Crippin, MD
- 2005–2006: Richard N. Fine, MD
- 2004–2005: Jay Alan Fishman, MD, FAST
- 2003–2004: Michael R. Lucey, MD
- 2002–2003: William E. Harmon, MD
- 2001–2002: Laurence A. Turka, MD, FAST
- 2000–2001: Mohamed H. Sayegh, MD, FAST
- 1999–2000: John R. Lake, MD
- 1998–1999: John F. Neylan, MD
- 1997–1998: J. Harold Helderman, MD, FAST
- 1996–1997: Leslie W. Miller, MD
- 1995–1996: Douglas J. Norman, MD, FAST
- 1994–1995: Thomas A. Gonwa, MD, FAST
- 1993–1994: Manikkam Suthanthiran, MD, FAST
- 1992–1993: Alan R. Hull, MD
- 1991–1992: Ronald H. Kerman, PhD, FAST
- 1990–1991: M. Roy First, MD
- 1989–1990: William E. Braun, MD, FAST
- 1988–1989: Barry S. Levin, MD
- 1987–1988: Lawrence G. Hunsicker, MD
- 1986–1987: Nancy E. Goeken
- 1985–1986: Fred P. Sanfilippo, MD, PhD
- 1984–1985: Robert B. Ettenger, MD
- 1983–1984: Charles B. Carpenter, MD
- 1982–1983: Ronald D. Guttmann, MD, FRCPC
- 1982–1983: Terry B. Strom, MD

== AST Research Network ==
The AST Research Network is the AST's mechanism for identifying, funding, and providing ongoing support to the most innovative research in transplantation and immunology.

== Power2Save (P2S) ==
Power2Save (P2S) is an initiative developed by the AST dedicated to increasing public awareness around the importance of donating organs, advocating for patient health, and funding transplant research.
