= El Beso (sculpture) =

Coordinates: 12.1276°S 77.0375°W

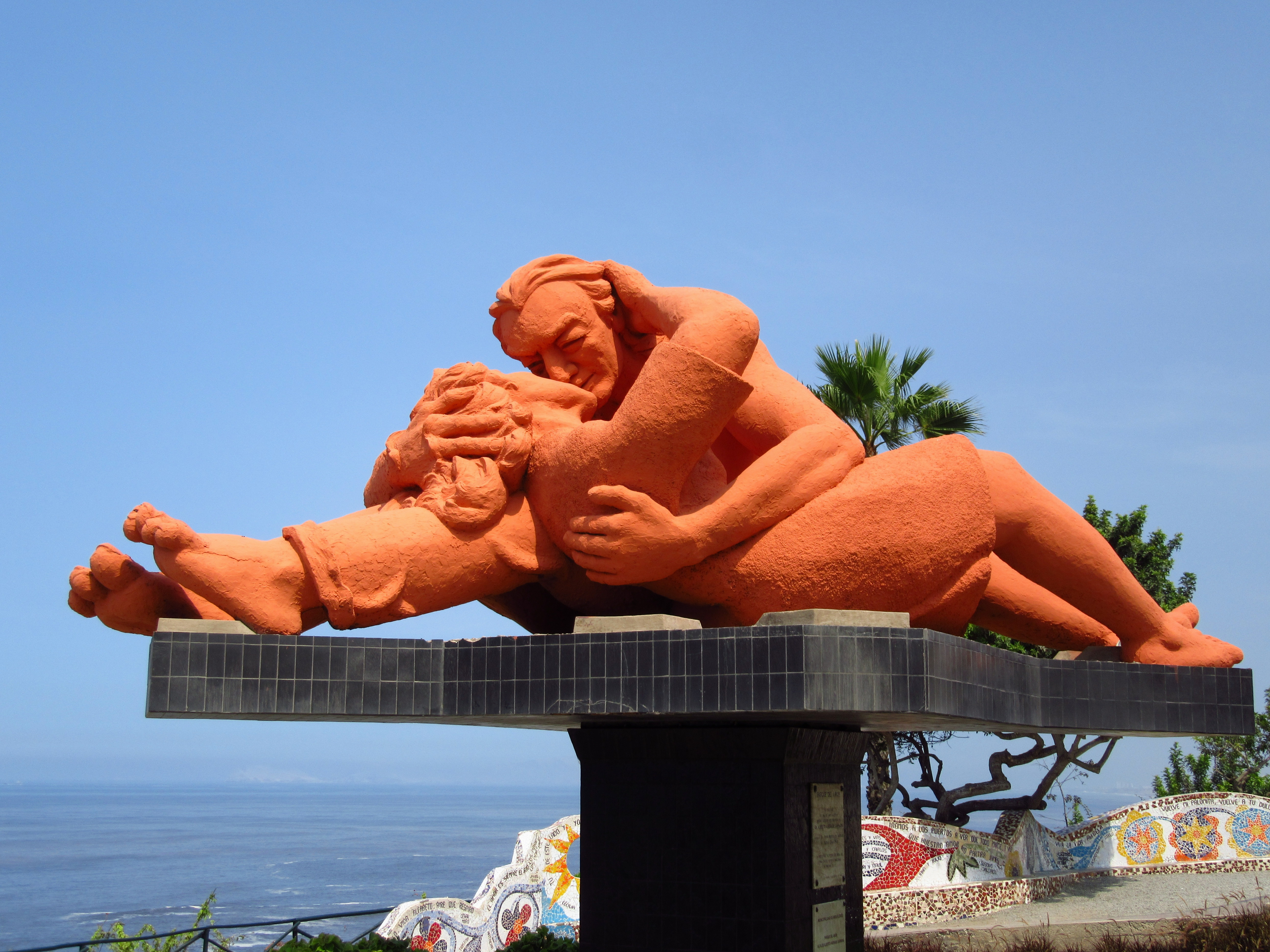
El Beso (2009)

El Beso (The Kiss) is a large sculpture in the "Parque del Amor" (Love Park) by the Pacific Ocean in the Miraflores district of Lima, Peru. It depicts the sculptor, Victor Delfín, and his wife kissing. According to local accounts, the mayor of the district holds (or used to hold) a competition for the couple who could sustain the longest kiss, and this sculpture celebrates this. The park is supposedly inspired by Antoni Gaudí's Parc Guell in Barcelona.
