= Alberto Piazza =

Italian human geneticist (1941–2024)

Alberto Piazza (18 October 1941 – 18 May 2024) was an Italian human geneticist who was Professor of Human Genetics at the University of Turin.

== Biography ==
Born into a Jewish family in Turin, professor of Medical Statistics at the University of Turin, professor of Genetics at the University of Naples, and professor of Human Genetics at the University of Turin.

His positions, include: President of the Academy of Sciences of Turin (2016–2018); Founder and President of the Human Genetics Foundation (HuGeF–Turin), (2009–2017); Emeritus Professor of Human Genetics at the School of Medicine, Department of Medical Sciences, University of Turin; Full Professor of Human Genetics at the Faculty of Medicine and Surgery (now School of Medicine, Department of Medical Sciences), University of Turin (1983–2016); President of the Bioethics Committee of the University of Turin; Director of the Department of Genetics, Biology and Biochemistry, University of Turin (1989–1998; 2004–2010); Visiting Professor of Genetics at the Department of Genetics, Stanford University School of Medicine, Stanford, California (1981–2004); Associate Professor of Genetics at the University of Naples (1980–1983); Lecturer in Medical Statistics at the Faculty of Medicine and Surgery, University of Turin (1968–1980).

A disciple of Luigi Luca Cavalli-Sforza, in 2001 he published a study concluding that the human races do not exist and that all humans belong to a unique species.

Piazza died on 18 May 2024, at the age of 82.

== Works ==
- (with Luigi Luca Cavalli-Sforza and Paolo Menozzi) The history and geography of human genes, Princeton University Press, 1994.
