= Víctor Delfín =

Peruvian sculptor and painter (born 1927)

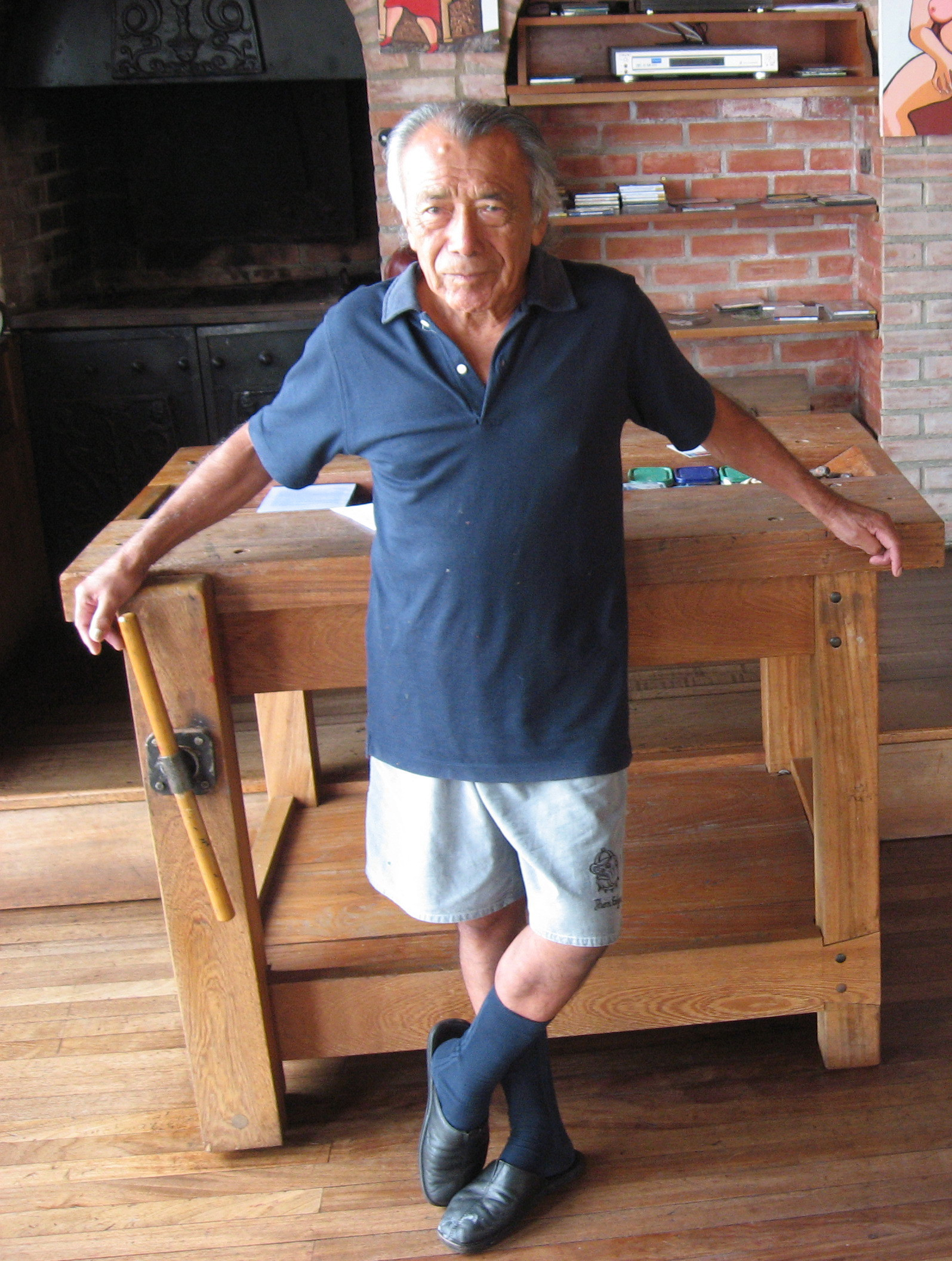
- Víctor Delfín in 2007
- Born: 20 December 1927 (age 98); Lobitos, Peru
- Education: Nation School of Fine Arts (Lima)
- Known for: Metalwork, wood, canvas, acrylics
- Notable work: El Beso

Víctor Delfín (born 20 December 1927) is one of the leading sculptors and painters in Peru. He is best known for his monumental El Beso (the kiss), a large sculpture unveiled in 1993 in the "Love Park" by the Pacific Ocean in the Miraflores district of Lima. Many newlyweds visit the park to pose in front of the sculpture. "It also draws throngs of lovers from all areas of Lima celebrating Valentine's Day each February 14."

== Early life ==
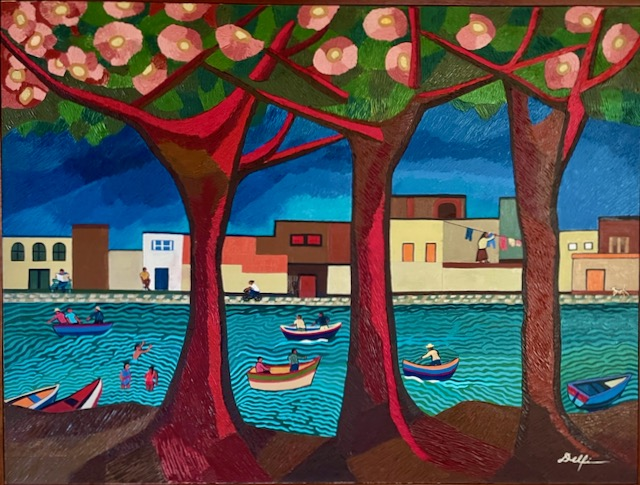
Victor Delfin oil painting, 43 inches x 58 inches (private collection)

Delfín was the youngest child of eight in a poor family of a welder in Lobitos, a coastal fishing village in the Piura region of northwest Peru, and grew up watching and helping his father grind bits for oil rigs in his workshop. At 14, he won a scholarship to art school in Lima and then eight years later he became eligible for a scholarship abroad but chose instead the Peruvian city of Ayacucho. "There I learned what art is all about," he said. "I saw so-called folk artists, the despised 'primitives,' creating masterpieces."

Delfín graduated from the National School of Fine Arts in Lima (es:Escuela Nacional de Bellas Artes de Lima) in 1958. In 1959, he was appointed director of Puno School of Fine Arts. After a brief stint as an art teacher in Chile, he set up his workshop in Barranco in 1965. In 1967, he was awarded first prize in the category of contemporary folk art at the Folk Art biennial in Lima. Many other awards and honors have followed, and Delfín has exerted great influence over the development of Peruvian art in the later half of the 20th century.

== Art style ==
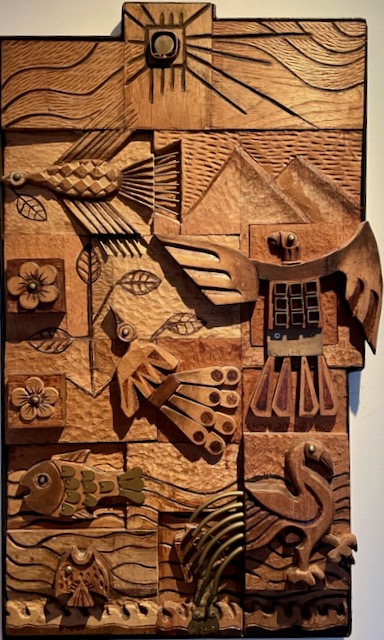
Victor Delfin artwork in Wood, Bronze and Iron, 33 inches x 20 inches, 2.3 inches thick (private collection)

Delfín has a worldwide reputation; his art has been exhibited across South and North America and is housed in major museum and private collections. Delfín is highly regarded for his massive metalwork sculptures of birds, horses and other animals, as well as sensual, often sexually charged paintings. His art can also have a strong political theme, such as 1996 chronicle that denounced, with great irony, the corruption and authoritarianism during the regime of Alberto Fujimori. Delfín's studio, in the artistic Barranco District of Lima, overlooks the ocean. His house, filled with his paintings and sculptures, is now a bed-and-breakfast run by his daughter.

Delfín works with a range of materials—wood, metal, canvas, even polychrome acrylics and aluminum. "One of the main distinguishing features of Delfín's work is that in the context of experimentalism, which at the time was mainly focused on art styles, systems and institutions and would lead to a crisis of representation and an ensuing widening of the material possibilities of production in plastic arts, Delfín also took it upon himself to ensure the continuity of a creative current socially subordinated to the current proclaimed as 'art' by modernist idealism." Delfín helped organize writers and authors in opposition to Fujimori and in 1995 participated in the Caucus for Peace, which brought together artists to protest the threat of conflict between Peru and Ecuador. In 2000, Delfín addressed young Peruvians in an open letter, encouraging their protests but warning "of a looming struggle against the dictator retaking power."

== References and sources ==
=== Sources ===
- Tarazona, Emilio (2009). Victor Delfín: 80 Years. Forma e Imagen de Billy Victor Odiago Franco.
- Rodman, Selden (1982). Artists in Tune with Their World: Masters of Popular Art in the Americas & Their Relation to the Folk Tradition. Simon & Schuster. ISBN 0671256114.
- Biography of Delfín. Rogallery, Long Island City, NY.
