= Emily Blumberg =

American physician and academic administrator

- Education: Princeton University; New York University
- Scientific career
- Fields: Infectious diseases, transplantation
- Workplaces: University of Pennsylvania

Emily A. Blumberg is an American physician and academic administrator specializing in infectious diseases. She is a professor of medicine and director of transplant infectious disease at the Hospital of the University of Pennsylvania.

== Life ==
Blumberg earned an A.B. in history from Princeton University in 1977. She completed an M.D. from New York University in 1981. At the University of Chicago Hospital, she completed an internship from 1981 to 1982 and a residency from 1982 to 1984. At the Montefiore Medical Center, she was a clinical fellow from 1984 to 1985 and research fellow from 1985 to 1987, both in infectious diseases.

Blumberg researches infections in transplant recipients, transplantation in HIV infected patients, and antiviral therapies in transplant recipients. She worked at Drexel University College of Medicine. In 1999, she joined the University of Pennsylvania. She is a professor of medicine specializing in infectious diseases at the Hospital of the University of Pennsylvania. She has served as an attending physician, the director of transplant infectious diseases since 1999, and the program director of the infectious diseases fellowship since 2005. She was president of the American Society of Transplantation from 2019 to 2020.
