= Acrylic =

Acrylic may refer to:

== Chemicals and materials ==
- Acrylic acid, the simplest acrylic compound
- Acrylate polymer, a group of polymers (plastics) noted for transparency and elasticity
- Acrylic resin, a group of related thermoplastic or thermosetting plastic substances
- Acrylic fiber, a synthetic fiber of polyacrylonitrile
- Acrylic paint, fast-drying paint containing pigment suspension in acrylic polymer emulsion
- Poly(methyl methacrylate), also known as acrylic glass or Plexiglass, a transparent thermoplastic

== Other uses ==
- Acrylic (album), by American rapper Leikeli47
- "Acrylic" (song), by English band The Courteeners
