= Eduardo Villena Rey Bridge =

Bridge in Lima, Peru

Eduardo Villena Rey Bridge Puente Eduardo Villena Rey
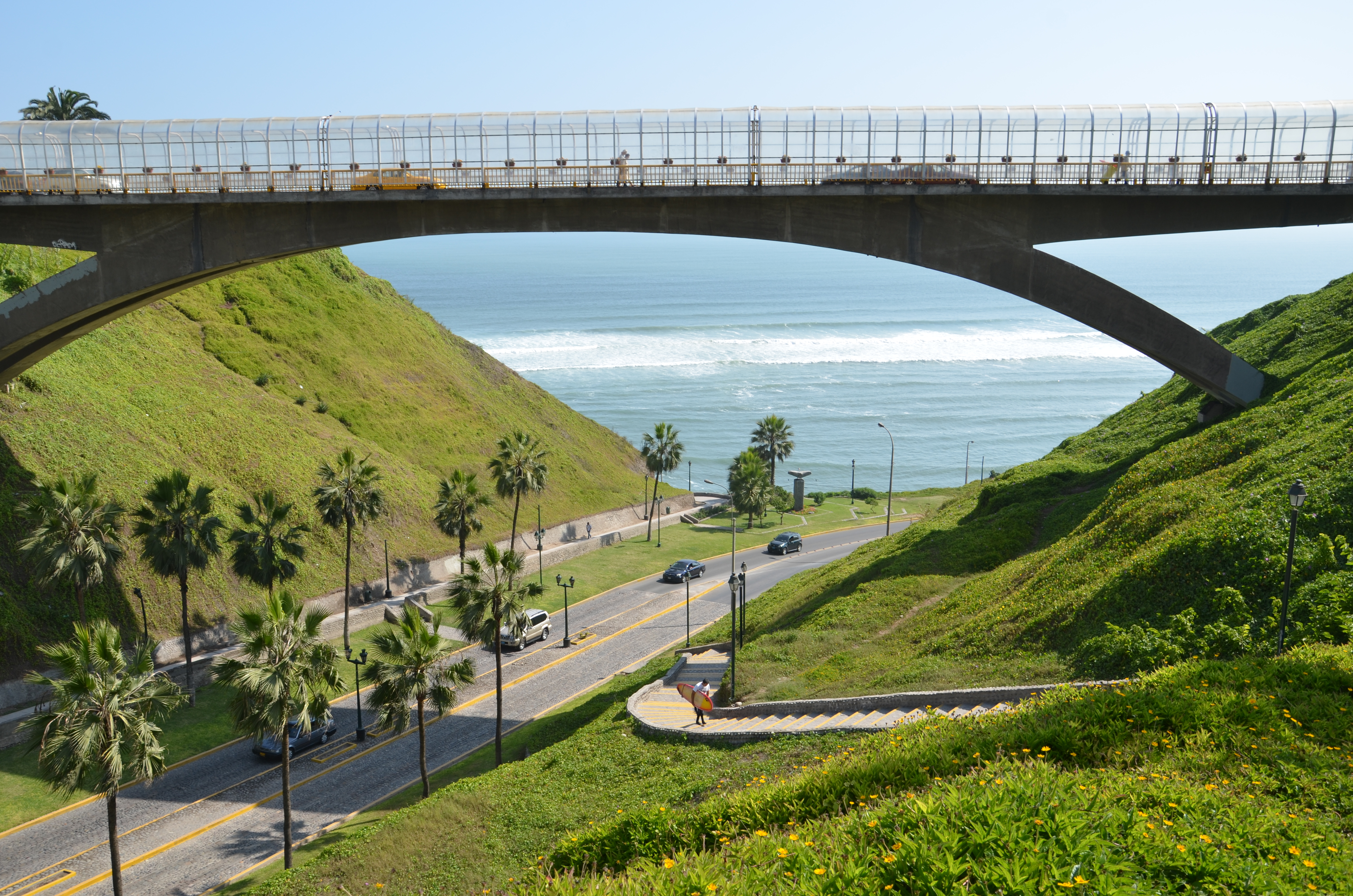
- The bridge in 2013
- Coordinates: 12°07′39″S 77°02′08″W
- Named for: Eduardo Villena Rey

History
- Construction start: 1966
- Construction end: 1967

Location
- Interactive map of Eduardo Villena Rey Bridge

Eduardo Villena Rey Bridge (Spanish: Puente Eduardo Villena Rey) is an arch bridge in Miraflores, Lima, Peru. It joins the Malecón de Miraflores and crosses the Bajada Balta.

== History ==
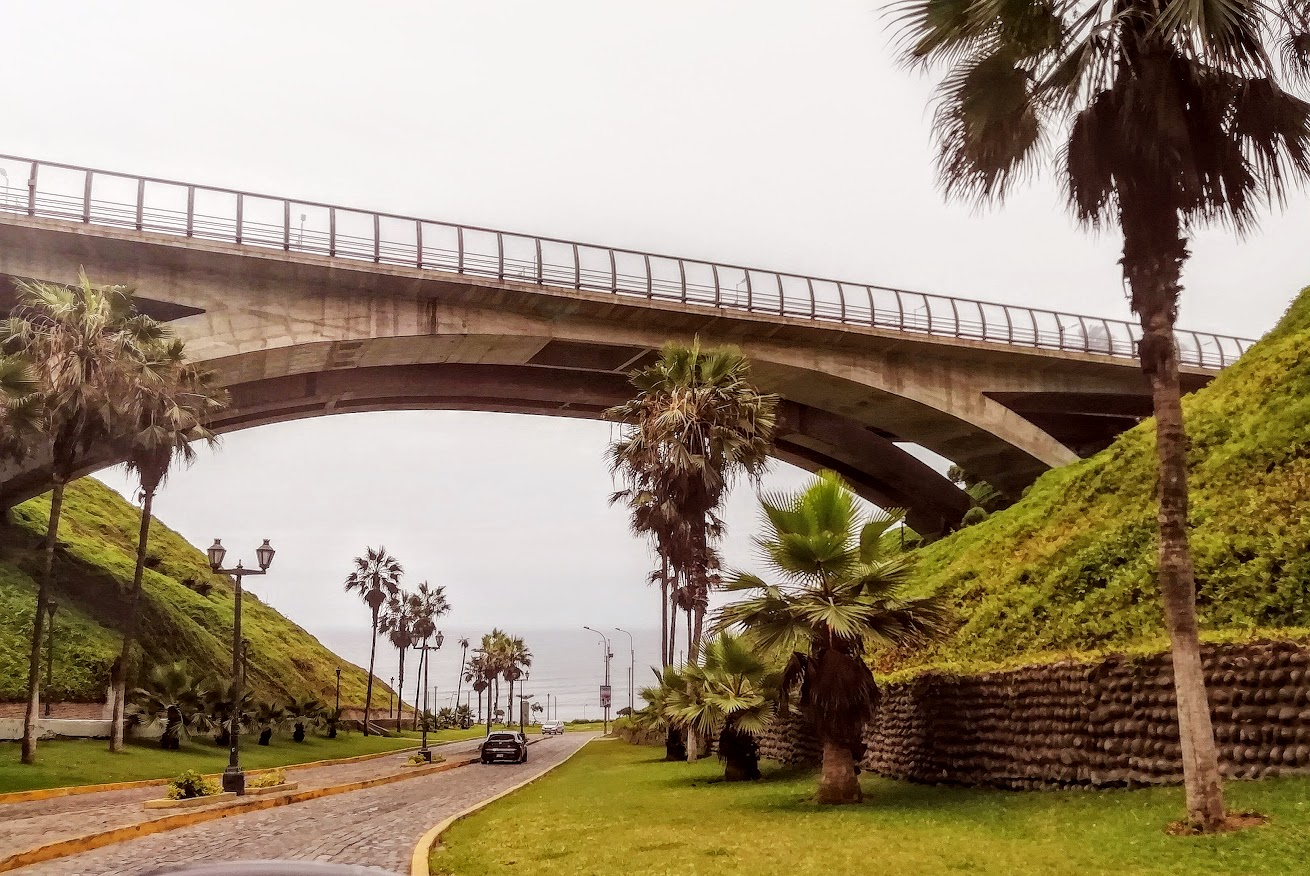
The bridge in 2020.

In 1966 the construction of the Villena Rey Bridge began and after a year it was inaugurated by Fernando Belaúnde Terry, president of Peru at that time. The name was given in homage to Eduardo Villena Rey, mayor of Miraflores during the years 1934-1937 and 1938-1939.

The bridge became infamous for its suicides, being a popular spot worldwide for people to take their lives. In 2014, the bridge was reportedly the seventh most popular place of its type, leading to the installation of protective windows to prevent more deaths.

This bridge was illuminated in the year 2021 in homage to the Bicentennial of the Independence of Peru. At night it lights up in white and red colors as in the flag of Peru and can be seen from afar. This illumination can be clearly seen from the city in contrast to the darkness of the sea behind, despite the side protection that prevents suicides.

== See also ==
- Suicide by jumping from height
- Malecón de Miraflores
