= Human Immunology =

- Discipline: Immunogenetics, Cellular Immunology and Immune Regulation, Clinical Immunology
- Language: English
- Edited by: James Mathew

Publication details
- History: 1980–present
- Publisher: Elsevier on behalf of the American Society for Histocompatibility and Immunogenetics (Netherlands)
- Frequency: Monthly
- Impact factor: 2.7 (2022)

Standard abbreviations
- ISO 4: Hum. Immunol.

Indexing
- CODEN: HUIMDQ
- ISSN: 0198-8859 (print); 1879-1166 (web)
- LCCN: 80648846
- OCLC no.: 806501374

Links
- Journal homepage; Online Access

Human Immunology is a monthly peer-reviewed medical journal published by Elsevier in behalf of the American Society for Histocompatibility and Immunogenetics. It contains original research articles, review articles, and brief communications on the subjects of immunogenetics, cellular immunology and immune regulation, and clinical immunology. The journal was established in 1980, and has been published monthly since 1983. The journal has had five editors-in-chief: Bernard Amos (1980–1996), Nicole Suciu-Foca (1997–2013), Steven Mack (2014–2016), Amy Hahn (2016–2022), and James Mathew (2023–present).

== Abstracting and indexing ==
The journal is abstracted and indexed in:

- Biological Abstracts
- BIOSIS Previews
- Chemical Abstracts Service
- Current Contents/Life Sciences
- EMBASE
- Elsevier Biobase
- Index Medicus/MEDLINE/PubMed
- Science Citation Index Expanded
- Scopus

According to the Journal Citation Reports, the journal has a 2022 impact factor of 2.7.

== Controversies ==
In 2001, Antonio Arnaiz-Villena co-authored a research paper in the journal on the genetic history of Jews, Palestinians, and other Mediterranean populations. The research results, which concluded that there are strong genetic ties between Israeli Jews and Palestinians, were controversial because of their political implications, as well as what some readers perceived to be political undertones in the article.

Following a large number of complaints, the article was withdrawn from the journal and deleted from the scientific archive. Academics who had already received a copy of the journal were urged to "physically remove" the article pages in a move that had no precedent in research publishing. The comments about Arab-Israeli conflicts were described by the journal's editor as "extreme political writing"; a description challenged by Arnaiz-Villena, who was subsequently removed from the journal's editorial board.

The journal's decision was met with opposition from several academics. Andrew Goffey, a senior lecturer at Middlesex University in England, observed that "it was conceded that the article had not been removed on the basis of its scientific evidence," failed to find anything offensive in the paper. Several scientists wrote to the publishers to support Arnaiz-Villena and to protest their heavy-handedness. One of them said: "If Arnaiz-Villena had found evidence that Jewish people were genetically very special, instead of ordinary, you can be sure no one would have objected to the phrases he used in his article. This is a very sad business."
