= Immunogenetics =

Branch of medical genetics

Immunogenetics or immungenetics is the branch of Medical Immunology and Medical Genetics that explores the relationship between the immune system and genetics.

Autoimmune diseases, such as type 1 diabetes, are complex genetic traits which result from defects in the immune system. Identification of genes defining the immune defects may identify new target genes for therapeutic approaches. Alternatively, genetic variations can also help to define the immunological pathway leading to disease.

== Origin ==
The term immunogenetics is based on the two words immunology and genetics, and is defined as "a sub discipline of genetics which deals with the genetic basis of the immune response (immunity)" according to MeSH.

Genetics (based on Greek γενεά geneá "descent" and γένεσις génesis "origin") is the science researching the transfer of characteristics from one generation to the next. The genes of an organism (strands of DNA) and the transfer of genes from the parent to the child generation of an organism in the scope of possible variations are the basis of genetics.

Immunology deals with the biological and biochemical basis for the body's defense against germs (such as bacteria, viruses, and fungi), as well as against foreign agents such as biological toxins and environmental pollutants, and failures and malfunctions of these defense mechanisms. Apart from these external effects on the organism, there are also defense reactions regarding the body's own cells, e.g. in the scope of the bodily reactions on cancer and the lacking reaction of a body on healthy cells in the scope of immune-mediated disease. Hence, immunology is a sub-category of biology. Its origin is usually attributed to Edward Jenner, who discovered in 1796 that cowpox, or vaccinia, induced protection against human smallpox.

The term immunogenetics comprises all processes of an organism, which are, on the one hand, controlled and influenced by the genes of the organism, and are, on the other hand, significant with regard to the immunological defense reactions of the organism.

== History ==
The history of immunology and the medical study of the immune system dates back to the 19th century. The first Nobel Prize in the field of immunogenetics was awarded to Baruj Benacerraf, Jean Dausset and George Davis Snell in 1980 for discovering genetically determined cellular surface structures, which control immunological reactions.

== Current research fields ==
Since 1972, numerous H&I (histocompatibility and immunogenetics) organizations have been founded specializing in research activities on a large number of different questions in immunogenetics. Both the acceleration of and the decreasing costs for the sequencing of the genes have resulted in more intensive research of both academic and commercial working groups. Current research topics particularly deal with forecasts on the course of diseases and therapy recommendations due to genetic dispositions and how these dispositions can be affected by agents (gene therapy).

In addition to its established role in autoimmune and infectious diseases, immunogenetics has recently been implicated in cancer susceptibility. Large population-based studies have shown that germline variation in human leukocyte antigen (HLA) genes, particularly heterozygosity at HLA class II loci, is associated with reduced risk of lung cancer, especially among smokers. These findings suggest that genetic diversity in antigen presentation may enhance immune surveillance of early neoplastic cells by increasing the range of tumor-derived peptides presented to CD4⁺ T cells. Furthermore, tumor genomic analyses have demonstrated frequent loss of heterozygosity at HLA loci in lung cancer, a mechanism associated with immune escape and indicative of immune-mediated selection during tumor evolution. Together, these studies indicate that immunogenetic variation contributes not only to immune responses against pathogens and self-antigens but also to the risk of cancer development.

A special focus is often laid on the forecast regarding and therapy of genetically based autoimmune diseases, which include all diseases caused by an extreme reaction of the immune system against the body's own tissue. By mistake, the immune system recognizes the body's own tissue as a foreign object which is to be fought. This can result in serious inflammatory reactions which may permanently damage the respective organs. Autoimmune diseases, the outbreak and/or course of which can be visible in the individual genome of the organism, include multiple sclerosis, diabetes type I, rheumatoid arthritis and Crohn's disease. As for multiple sclerosis, an article in the journal Nature dated May 2010 showed that this autoimmune disease is not caused by a genetic variation but the course and the treatability are considerably influenced by genetic dispositions. This research was based on analyzing three monovular pairs of twins, of which one twin has contracted multiple sclerosis whereas the other one has not.

== See also ==
- American Society for Histocompatibility and Immunogenetics
- European Federation for Immunogenetics
- Histocompatibility
