= Cajabamba =

Cajabamba may refer to:

Peru:

- Cajabamba, Peru, capital of the Cajabamba District and Cajabamba Province
- Cajabamba District, a district in the Cajabamba Province
- Cajabamba Province, a province in the Cajamarca region

Elsewhere:

- Cajabamba, Colombia, an administrative region in Nariño, Colombia
- Cajabamba, Ecuador, a town in Chimborazo, Ecuador
