= 1932 Trujillo uprising =

1932 uprising in Peru

- Part of the Third Militarism
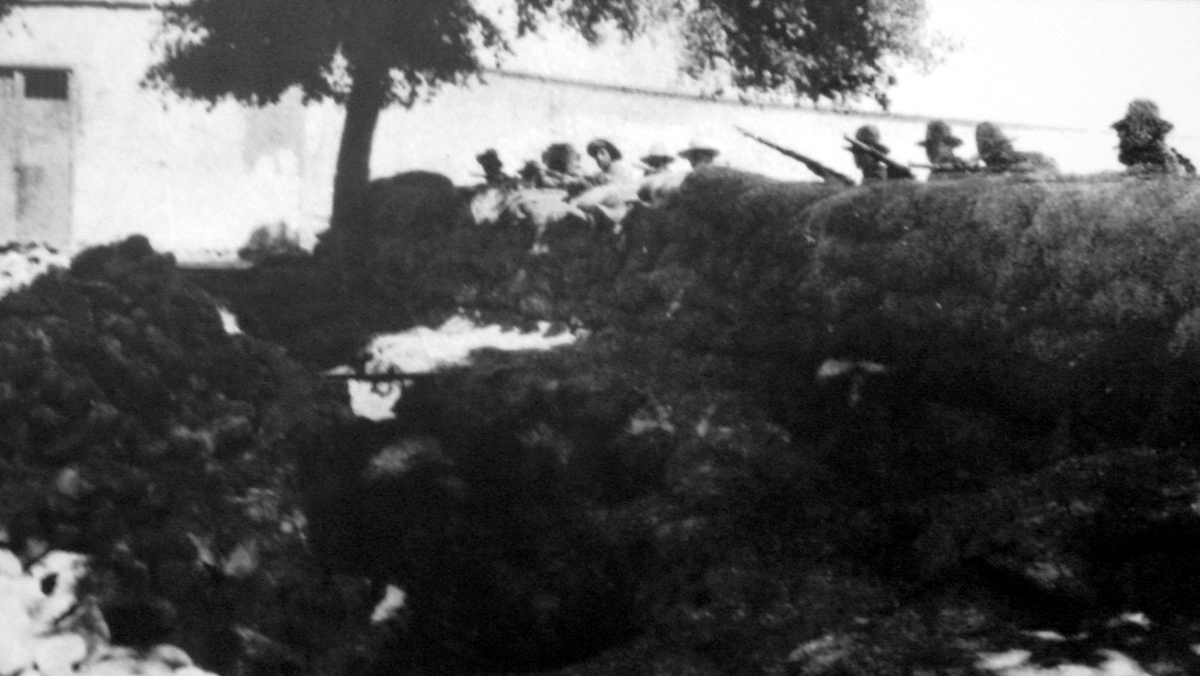
- Aprista troops occupy a trench in the neighbourhood of Mansiche
| Date | July 7–27, 1932 |
| Location | Trujillo, Peru (Note: Throughout the month, the revolt also spread to nearby Chan Chan, as well as the cities of Cajabamba and Huaraz.) |
| Result | Peruvian government victory; Subsequent persecution and executions of Apristas.; Destruction of the city by a ground and air campaign. |

Belligerents
| Peruvian Aprist Party; Supported by: Soviet Union (denied) | Government of Peru; Supported by: Revolutionary Union |

Commanders and leaders
| Víctor Raúl Haya de la Torre; Manuel Barreto Risco (executed); Alfredo Tello Salavarria †; Leoncio Manffaurt (MIA) | Luis M. Sánchez Cerro; Alfredo Miró Quesada; Manuel Ruíz Bravo; Eloy Gaspar Ureta |

Units involved
| Thousands of búfalos rebels | 1st Military Region |

Strength
| est. 10,000–15,000 rebels | |

Casualties and losses
| 952–1,500 killed 9,000–13,000 captured | 327–513 killed |
- 7,000–9,000 Apristas Trujillans civilians killed (claimed by APRA)

The 1932 Trujillo uprising (Spanish: Sublevación de Trujillo) (Note: The events are either described as an uprising, insurrection, or revolution. Of these terms, the latter is used by Aprista sympathisers.) was an armed revolt carried out by members of the American Popular Revolutionary Alliance (APRA) against the government of Luis Miguel Sánchez Cerro that took place in the northern Peruvian city of Trujillo in July 1932.

It started with an uprising led by Manuel "Búfalo" Barreto Risco and Agustín Haya de la Torre that took over the Ricardo O'Donovan Barracks on July 7, eventually spreading citywide until its suppression by the Peruvian Armed Forces by July 10, with the last reprisals taking place on July 27. In Aprista historiography, it forms part of the political group's "year of brutality" and of the "civil war of 1932–1933" due to the period's armed nature.

== Background ==
Anarchist and revolutionary syndicalist ideas burst onto the scene in Trujillo at the beginning of the 20th century. The main person responsible for their dissemination was Julio Reynaga Matute, a founding member of the League of Artisans and Workers of Peru in Trujillo in 1898. He later founded the Center for Social Studies "Unión y Energía" in 1905 and the newspapers La Antorcha (1903-1907) and El Jornalero (1906-1915). The insurrection that broke out in Ferrañafe in 1910, led by Manuel Casimiro Chumán Velásquez, a mestizo priest opposed to latifundism, was supported by the anarchist movement. It was followed by the rebellions of braceros in the Chicama Valley in 1912 and 1921-1922.

During the 1920s and 1930s, Trujillo experienced a period of social unrest, like much of the country. The gestation and growth of the union organization among the peasants of the haciendas of the region, the agitation of the progressive urban intelligentsia and the organization of the APRA, which had been founded in September 1930 in Mexico, were persecuted, its main leaders including Haya de la Torre - imprisoned. Areas such as Casa Grande, Cartavio and Laredo, previously influenced by revolutionary syndicalism and libertarian ideas, became strongholds of the Peruvian Aprista Party, a political organization with a socialist orientation founded by the student leader Víctor Raúl Haya de la Torre.

On January 8, 1932, the then President of Peru Luis Sánchez Cerro (constitutionally elected the previous year), perpetrated a "self-coup"; publishing an unconstitutional law that outlawed political freedoms and allowed the arrest of any citizen without a court order; this fact, added to social inequalities, the lack of respect for the labor rights of workers in the sugar plantations located north of the city of Trujillo, increased the social discontent that the union organization, with marked APRA influence, channeled. From that moment on, the demands for the end of the Sánchez government and for the release of the political leader Víctor Raúl Haya de la Torre, who had been imprisoned since May 6 in the El Frontón prison, became unstoppable.

== History ==
On January 8, 1932, the President of Peru, Luis Sanchez Cerro, carried out an "autocoup" by outlawing political liberties and allowing for citizens to be detained without a warrant. It was the combination of this action, social inequalities and violations of sugar plantation workers labor rights which led to further civil unrest. Additionally, the party showed little interest in the indigenous peasants.

On the dawn of July 7, 1932, an insurgent group composed mainly of peasants and workers, led by Manuel Barreto, attacked and captured the artillery barrack Ricardo O'Donovan, located at the former entrance to the city. In this assault, Barreto was one of the first to fall afflicted. The headquarters were ransacked. The weapons (including six mobile guns, rifles and machine guns) were distributed among the insurgents. In the morning, the city was taken by the people. Rebel Don Agustín Haya de la Torre (brother Víctor Raúl Haya de la Torre) was appointed Prefect (highest civil authority). The districts bordering the city also joined the insurrection.

== The rebellion ==
=== Capture of the Ricardo O'Donovan barracks ===
On July 7, 1932, at two in the morning, a group composed mainly of sugarcane workers from the Hacienda Laredo and students from the Colegio Nacional San Juan assaulted the "Ricardo O'Donovan" artillery barracks, located at the then entrance to the city. Agustín Haya de la Torre was in the Revolutionary Command, while at the front of the masses were Víctor Eloy Calderón Muñoz, Víctor Augusto Silva Solís, Remigio Esquivel and the worker Manuel Barreto Risco (called "El búfalo"), a recognized APRA leader of imposing presence. The fight lasted more than three hours, causing numerous casualties on both sides and ending with the triumph of the insurgents. One of the first to fall was "El búfalo" Barreto, but the insurgents were gaining ground, taking soon after the Security Headquarters and the Prefecture premises, whose leadership was assumed de facto by the young APRA member Alfredo Tello Salavarria, who managed to take the barracks, marching triumphantly to Trujillo, where he hands over command to Agustín Haya de la Torre (brother of the APRA leader). Military command was handed over to Captain E.P. Leoncio Manffaurt. Among the rebels, there was also the young writer Ciro Alegría.

The uprising spread to Salaverry, Samne, various places in the Chicama Valley, Otuzco, Santiago de Chuco and Huamachuco. It also reached Cajabamba in Cajamarca and had repercussions in Huaraz.

=== Government reaction ===
Faced with the Trujillo insurgency, the Congress of the Republic held an emergency meeting approving a state of siege and the creation of martial courts; for its part, the government of Sánchez Cerro sent troops from Lima, whose command was assumed by Major Alfredo Miró Quesada. At the head of the Infantry Regiment No. 7 and with the support of two companies arrived by land from Chimbote, Miró Quesada recovered the port of Salaverry, which had also been captured by the rebels.

=== Trujillo bombing ===
At dusk on Saturday the 9th, Miró Quesada's troops approached Trujillo , but found such stubborn resistance that they decided to retreat to Salaverry, suffering losses of life and war material in the area known as "La Floresta". The "insurgents" celebrated the victory with jubilation, making the mistake of not pursuing the government troops.

The government handed over command of the repression to the head of the First Military Region based in Lambayeque, Colonel Manuel Ruíz Bravo, who came from the north. Under his command were the 7th Infantry Regiment, a company of the 1st Infantry Regiment, a rifle company and a machine gun section of the 11th Infantry Regiment stationed in Cajamarca, and several detachments of the Civil Guard.

Colonel Ruíz Bravo, together with his General Staff headed by Lieutenant Colonel Eloy Ureta (future Marshal), meticulously planned the assault on Trujillo. The plan combined two fronts of action: one based in the port of Salaverry, with troops from Lima under the command of Miró Quesada; and another with troops from the north. Previously, an air attack was ordered to clear machine gun nests and other pockets of resistance in the city, an operation that was the first action of military aviation in Peru, using the recently acquired fighter planes.

In the midst of the bombardment of the city, the insurgent leaders went underground and the people, up in arms, prepared to resist the army's action. The attack by ground troops on Trujillo began in the early hours of July 10.

=== O'Donovan barracks massacre ===
O'Donovan massacre
- Location: Trujillo, Peru
- Date: July 9, 1932–July 10, 1932
- Target: Peruvian Army and Peruvian Civil Guard
- Attack type: Massacres, mass executions
- Deaths: 12 executed
- Perpetrator: Aprista Army
- Motive: Communism; Aprismo; Freemasonry

On the night of July 9, the insurgent command, headed by Agustín Haya de la Torre and other APRA leaders, gave orders to support the insurgent processes in the sierra (highlands) of La Libertad and other insurgent zones; and the coordinators were distributed among them. In the midst of the events, which included taking over the direction of the process, new authorities were named: Prefect Agustín Haya de la Torre and Subprefect Víctor Augusto Silva Solís, in addition to the other local authorities. In the early hours of July 10, the few army and police officers who had not joined the insurrectional movement like the majority, were captured in the O'Donovan Barracks and then transferred to the Iturregui Palace, where the revolutionary prefecture would operate. There, they were massacred in the most horrible way by an overflowing mob of common prisoners in their eagerness to loot and flee, in the midst of a confusing incident that was never clarified. The victimized officers were the following:

- From the Artillery Regiment No. 1: Lieutenant Colonel EP Julio P. Silva Cáceda, Major Luis Pérez Salmón, Captain Manuel Morzán, Captain Víctor Corante; ensigns: Ricardo Revelli Elías, Alfredo Molina and Miguel Picasso Rodríguez.
- From the Infantry Regiment No. 1: Second Lieutenants Carlos Hernández Herrera, Federico Mendoza Gastón and Carlos Valderrama.
- From the Police (Civil Guard): Captain GC Eduardo Carbajal Loayza and Lieutenant GC Alberto Villanueva Gómez.

The bodies were mutilated and looted; according to some, the situation reached the extreme of removing the heart of Commander Silva Cáceda and removing the genitals of Lieutenant Villanueva. However, another version, based on the reports of the medical examiners, denies the desecration and mutilation of the bodies.

Thorndike mentions by name those who led the massacre: the former sergeant Julio Alvarado, an ex-convict known as “Chueco Carrillo” and a former guard named Talavera, the same ones who acted as guardians of the prisoners. They would have acted motivated by personal revenge or swept away by the heat of the conflict.

Although the perpetrators were accused of being APRA militants or sympathizers, this has not been proven, nor has it been proven that its leaders ordered the massacre, as some have claimed. The truth is that the people's animosity towards the forces of law and order had been there for some time and did not erupt suddenly.

=== End of the revolution ===
In the early hours of July 10, after an intense aerial and ground bombardment, a large deployment of troops on two fronts began the occupation of the city. The armed population resisted the attack of the government forces until the 11th; there were numerous casualties on both sides. At the “Portada de Mansiche”, a group of snipers led by Carlos Cabada stopped the advance of the army, helping to strengthen the defenses within the city. In the “El Recreo” square, a lady named María Luisa Obregón, nicknamed “La Laredina” led the resistance by firing a machine gun herself; the fight was fought street by street; the soldiers were received with gunfire and in general with any blunt object thrown by the rebel population from the roofs, amidst chants and slogans alluding to the Peruvian APRA party. It was Professor Alfredo Tello Salavarría who remained in front of the last trenches, in the Trujillo neighborhood of “Chicago”.

On July 18, the chief of operations, Colonel Ruiz Bravo, reported having full territorial control, after committing numerous reprisals against the civilian population in Chepén, Mansiche, Casa Grande, Ascope and Cartavio (the last three sugar plantations where some of the insurgents worked).

== The Executions ==
=== Chan Chan massacre ===
Chan Chan massacre
- Location: Chan Chan, Peru
- Date: July 27, 1932
- Target: Apristas including civilians pro APRA
- Attack type: Massacres, mass executions and revenge
- Deaths: 42 executed
- Perpetrators: Peruvian Army; Peruvian Navy; Peruvian Republican Guard
- Motive: Anticommunism; Peruvian nationalism Antiterrorism; Anti-Aprista sentiment Anti-Masonry

Numerous fighters who had surrendered were shot without trial. A "Court Martial" without any guarantees or independence pronounced the death penalty against 102 people accused of being the main responsible for the uprising; since many of these were fugitives and others had died in the confrontation, the sentence could only be applied to 42 detainees, who were transferred to the citadel of Chan Chan, forced to dig the pits that would become their graves and without exception received the fatal shot on July 27, 1932. But it is estimated that the number of victims at the end of the conflict reached approximately 9 thousand civilians, closely linked to the APRA party, who were shot extrajudicially. Even so, they faced death, cheering the APRA party and its leader Víctor Raúl Haya de la Torre.

== See also ==
- Búfalos
