= "Cochranella" euhystrix =

Conservation status
- Critically Endangered (IUCN 3.1)

Scientific classification
- Kingdom: Animalia
- Phylum: Chordata
- Class: Amphibia
- Order: Anura
- Family: Centrolenidae
- Genus: "Cochranella"
- Species: "C." euhystrix

Binomial name
- "Cochranella" euhystrix (Cadle and McDiarmid, 1990)
- "Cochranella" euhystrix is only known from the vicinity of its type locality in Department of Cajamarca, Peru

Synonyms
- Centrolenella euhystrix Cadle and McDiarmid, 1990

Species of frog

"Cochranella" euhystrix is a species of frog in the family Centrolenidae. It has an uncertain placement (incertae sedis) within subfamily Centroleninae (hence the quotation marks around the genus). It is endemic to Peru and only known from the vicinity of its type locality near Cerro Blanco, in the Zaña River watershed, Department of Cajamarca. The specific name euhystrix (from Greek prefix eu, "very", and hystrix, "porcupine") refers to the unusually spiny appearance of this frog, especially males. Common name ridge Cochran frog has been proposed for this frog.

== Description ==
Adult males measure 29–31 mm (1.1–1.2 in) and adult females 31–34 mm (1.2–1.3 in) in snout–vent length. The head is wider than the body. The snout is truncate, sometimes slightly rounded in profile in females. The tympanum is distinct, but partly covered by the heavy supratympanic fold, especially in females. The fingers have lateral fringes and are partially webbed; the toes are heavily webbed. All digits bear expanded discs. The dorsum is dark greenish black in active individuals and dark green in inactive ones. The color can change rapidly. There are many light green spicules, especially on the eyelids lips, that give the upper parts a finely dotted appearance. Females have fewer spines than males.

The male advertisement call is a short "click" or "chirp". Most calls consist of two notes in rapid succession but some calls have a single note only.

== Habitat and conservation ==
This species occurs in montane forests at elevations of 1,800–2,650 m (5,910–8,690 ft) above sea level. It is closely associated with mountain streams, with individuals typically found on vertical rock faces in the splash or spray zones of waterfalls on rock ledges in or around waterfalls, and on liverwort and moss-covered wet boulders in midstream. Breeding takes place along permanent streams at high altitudes.

Field surveys during 2006–2011 in the area of its type locality did not record any individuals. There is severe habitat loss and fragmentation in the area, even affecting the Bosques Nublados de Udima Wildlife Refuge that lies within the range of this species (although it has not been recorded in the reserve).
