= Sandoná =

Coordinates: 1°17′N 77°28′W

Sandona
- Municipality and town
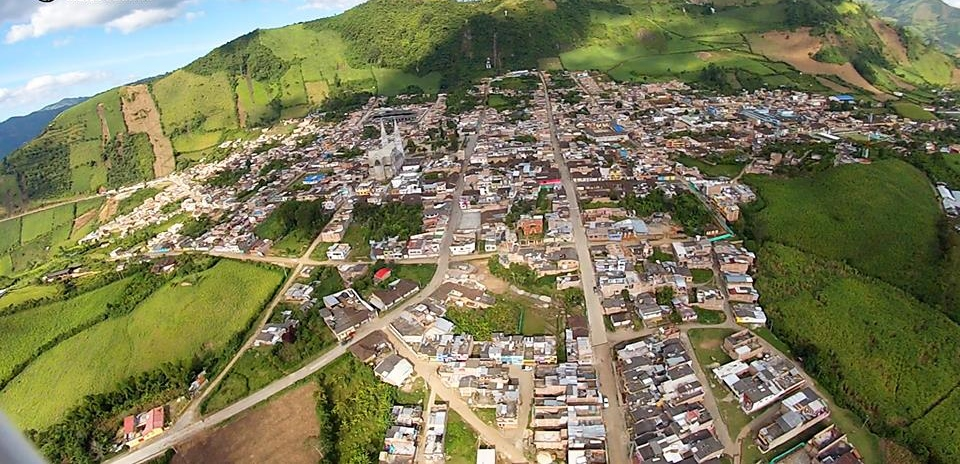

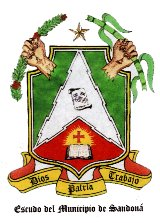
- Flag Coat of arms

- Location of the municipality and town of Sandona in the Nariño Department of Colombia.
- Country: Colombia
- Department: Nariño Department

Population (Census 2018)
  - Total: 18,859
- Time zone: UTC-5 (Colombia Standard Time)

Sandona is a town and municipality in Nariño Department, Colombia.

== Climate ==
Climate data for Sandona/Consaca (Ospina Perez), elevation 1,700 m (5,600 ft), (1981–2010)
Month	Jan	Feb	Mar	Apr	May	Jun	Jul	Aug	Sep	Oct	Nov	Dec	Year
Mean daily maximum °C (°F)	24.8 (76.6)	25.1 (77.2)	25.5 (77.9)	24.8 (76.6)	24.7 (76.5)	25.3 (77.5)	26.0 (78.8)	26.4 (79.5)	26.1 (79.0)	24.8 (76.6)	24.6 (76.3)	24.6 (76.3)	25.2 (77.4)
Daily mean °C (°F)	19.1 (66.4)	19.4 (66.9)	19.6 (67.3)	19.4 (66.9)	19.3 (66.7)	19.7 (67.5)	20.0 (68.0)	20.2 (68.4)	19.8 (67.6)	19.1 (66.4)	18.9 (66.0)	19.0 (66.2)	19.5 (67.1)
Mean daily minimum °C (°F)	15.0 (59.0)	15.1 (59.2)	15.3 (59.5)	15.3 (59.5)	15.2 (59.4)	15.0 (59.0)	14.6 (58.3)	14.9 (58.8)	14.7 (58.5)	14.8 (58.6)	14.8 (58.6)	14.8 (58.6)	15.0 (59.0)
Average precipitation mm (inches)	107.6 (4.24)	107.3 (4.22)	130.8 (5.15)	187.8 (7.39)	142.5 (5.61)	78.0 (3.07)	50.7 (2.00)	45.2 (1.78)	89.0 (3.50)	168.8 (6.65)	162.1 (6.38)	147.3 (5.80)	1,417.1 (55.79)
Average relative humidity (%)	80	78	78	82	81	73	64	64	70	80	81	82	76
Mean monthly sunshine hours	145.7	118.6	127.1	111.0	124.0	147.0	173.6	167.4	147.0	127.1	141.0	148.8	1,678.3
Mean daily sunshine hours	4.7	4.2	4.1	3.7	4.0	4.9	5.6	5.4	4.9	4.1	4.7	4.8	4.6
Source: Instituto de Hidrologia Meteorologia y Estudios Ambientales
