= La Esperanza District =

La Esperanza District may refer to:

- La Esperanza District, Trujillo
- La Esperanza District, Santa Cruz
