= Santa Cruz province, Peru =

Coordinates: 6.594484°S 78.846066°W

Santa Cruz Province
- Province
- Location of Santa Cruz Province in Cajamarca Department.
- Country: Peru
- Region: Cajamarca Region
- Capital: Santa Cruz de Succhabamba

Area
  - Total: 1,417.93 km^{2} (547.47 sq mi)

Population (2002)
  - Total: 49,302
  - Density: 34.770/km^{2} (90.055/sq mi)

Santa Cruz is a province in the Cajamarca Region of Peru, with its capital at Santa Cruz de Succhabamba. The province has an area of 1,417.93 km^{2} and the government population estimate for 2002 is 49,302, with the 1993 census showing a population of 44,571. Agriculture is the predominant economic activity.

== Geography ==
The province of Santa Cruz's land area is 1,423 km^{2}, 4.2% of the total of the Cajamarca Region. It is mostly mountainous in relief. It is located on the Western Mountain range of the Andes and is bounded by the mountains that descend to the coast and the deep rivers that carve the mountains. Its lowest elevation is in the Saña River, near the small village of Pan de Azucar, 265 meters above sea level, and highest in the Cerro Cimarrones, 3,600 meters above sea level, south of the town of Pulán.

It is bounded to the North by Chota, to the East by Hualgayoc and Chota, to the South by San Miguel, and to the West by Lambayeque.

The climate is varied with an average temperature of 22 °C. in the Chala area and 17 °C. in the Yunga area.

== Political division ==
The province is divided into eleven districts:

District	Mayor	Capital
Santa Cruz	Manuel Apolinar Ruiz Bravo	Santa Cruz de Succhabamba
Andabamba	José Clodomiro Rojas Tarrillo	Andabamba
Catache	Luis Gonzaga Bravo Quiroz	Catache
Chancaybaños	Orlandini Davila Davila	Chancaybaños
La Esperanza	José Marino Diaz Alarcon	La Esperanza
Ninabamba	Elidor Diaz Silva	Ninabamba
Pulán	Salatiel Romero Malca	Pulán
Saucepampa	Ernesto Suxe Palomino	Saucepampa
Sexi	Celer Froilan Perales Perez	Sexi
Uticyacu	Guillermo Mera Flores	Uticyacu
Yauyucán	Mario Wilfredo Vargas Vasquez	Yauyucán

== Places of interest ==
- Bosques Nublados de Udima Wildlife Refuge
- Chancaybaños Reserved Zone
- Udima

== See also ==
- Q'inququcha
- Yawarqucha
