= Santa Cruz de Succhubamba =

- Town
- Location within Peru
- Coordinates: 6.626°S 78.945°W
- Country: Peru
- Region: Cajamarca
- Province: Santa Cruz
- District: Santa Cruz
- Time zone: UTC-5 (PET)

Santa Cruz de Succhubamba is a town in northern Peru, capital of Santa Cruz Province in Cajamarca Region.

== Climate ==
Climate data for Santa Cruz de Succhubamba (1991–2020)
Month	Jan	Feb	Mar	Apr	May	Jun	Jul	Aug	Sep	Oct	Nov	Dec	Year
Mean daily maximum °C (°F)	22.6 (72.7)	22.5 (72.5)	22.6 (72.7)	22.7 (72.9)	23.0 (73.4)	23.0 (73.4)	23.0 (73.4)	23.8 (74.8)	24.3 (75.7)	23.8 (74.8)	23.5 (74.3)	23.1 (73.6)	23.2 (73.8)
Mean daily minimum °C (°F)	12.5 (54.5)	13.1 (55.6)	13.5 (56.3)	13.1 (55.6)	12.2 (54.0)	11.0 (51.8)	10.4 (50.7)	10.7 (51.3)	11.8 (53.2)	11.8 (53.2)	10.9 (51.6)	12.0 (53.6)	11.9 (53.4)
Average precipitation mm (inches)	52.9 (2.08)	78.7 (3.10)	126.2 (4.97)	134.1 (5.28)	75.9 (2.99)	24.6 (0.97)	14.1 (0.56)	10.7 (0.42)	52.1 (2.05)	65.9 (2.59)	54.8 (2.16)	51.9 (2.04)	741.9 (29.21)
Source: NOAA
