= Military ranks of Peru =

The Military ranks of Peru are the military insignia used by the Peruvian Armed Forces.

== Commissioned officer ranks ==
The rank insignia of commissioned officers.

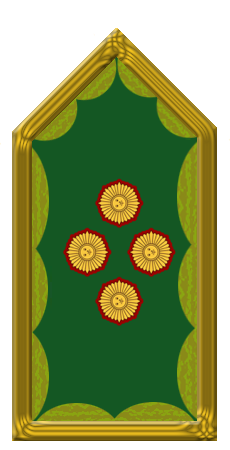
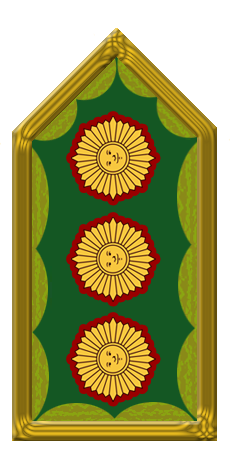
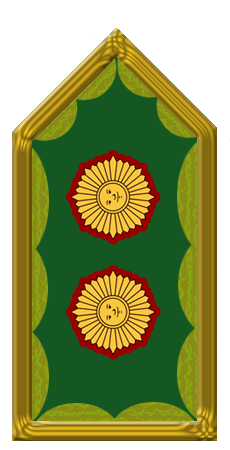
Rank group	General / flag officers				Senior officers			Junior officers
Peruvian Army
Peruvian Army	Gran Mariscal del Perú	General de ejército	General de división	General de brigada	Coronel	Teniente coronel	Mayor	Capitán	Teniente	Subteniente
Peruvian Navy
Peruvian Navy	Gran Almirante del Perú	Almirante	Vicealmirante	Contraalmirante	Capitán de navío	Capitán de fragata	Capitán de corbeta	Teniente primero	Teniente segundo	Alférez de fragata
Peruvian Air Force
Peruvian Air Force		General del aire	Teniente general	Mayor general	Coronel	Comandante	Mayor	Capitán	Teniente	Alférez
National Police of Peru
National Police of Peru		General de policía	Teniente general	General	Coronel	Comandante	Mayor	Capitán	Teniente	Alférez
Rank group	General / flag officers				Senior officers			Junior officers

== Other ranks ==
The rank insignia of non-commissioned officers and enlisted personnel.

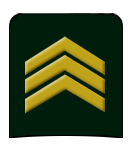
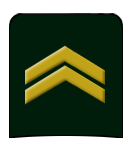
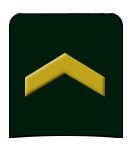
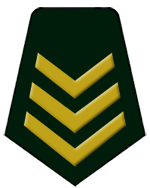
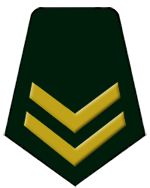
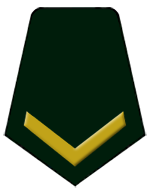
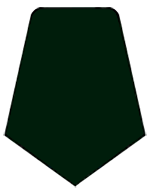
Rank group	Senior NCOs					Junior NCOs	Enlisted
Peruvian Army
Peruvian Army	Suboficial primero	Suboficial segundo	Suboficial tercero	Sargento primero	Sargento segundo	Cabo	Soldado
Peruvian Navy						No insignia	No insignia
Peruvian Navy	Oficial de mar primero	Oficial de mar segundo	Oficial de mar tercero	Cabo primero	Cabo segundo	Marinero	Grumete
Peruvian Air Force
Peruvian Air Force	Suboficial primero	Suboficial segundo	Suboficial tercero	Sargento primero	Sargento segundo	Cabo	Avionero
National Police of Peru
National Police of Peru	Suboficial primero	Suboficial segundo	Suboficial tercero
Rank group	Senior NCOs					Junior NCOs	Enlisted

== Technician ranks ==
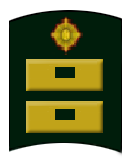
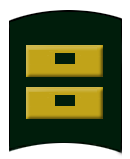
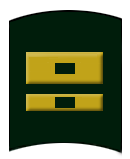
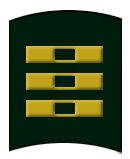
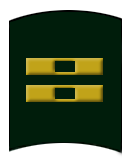
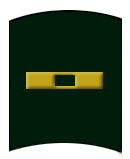
Equivalent NATO rank	WO-5	WO-4		WO-3	WO-2	WO-1
Peruvian Army
Peruvian Army	Técnico superior general del ejército	Técnico jefe superior	Técnico jefe	Técnico primero	Técnico segundo	Técnico tercero
Peruvian Navy
Peruvian Navy	Técnico Supervisor Primero	Técnico Supervisor Segundo		Técnico Primero	Técnico Segundo	Técnico Tercero
Peruvian Air Force
Peruvian Air Force	Técnico Supervisor Mayor	Técnico Supervisor	Técnico Inspector	Técnico Primero	Técnico Segundo	Técnico Tercero
National Police of Peru
National Police of Peru	Suboficial Técnico Superior	Suboficial Técnico Brigadier		Suboficial Técnico Primero	Suboficial Técnico Segundo	Suboficial Técnico Tercero
