= Ninabamba District =

Coordinates: 6.6500°S 78.7876°W

Ninabamba Ninapampa
- District
- Interactive map of Ninabamba
- Country: Peru
- Region: Cajamarca
- Province: Santa Cruz
- Founded: April 21, 1950
- Capital: Ninabamba

Government
  - Mayor: Elidor Diaz Silva

Area
  - Total: 60.04 km^{2} (23.18 sq mi)
- Elevation: 2,175 m (7,136 ft)

Population (2005 census)
  - Total: 3,214
  - Density: 53.53/km^{2} (138.6/sq mi)
- Time zone: UTC-5 (PET)
- UBIGEO: 061306

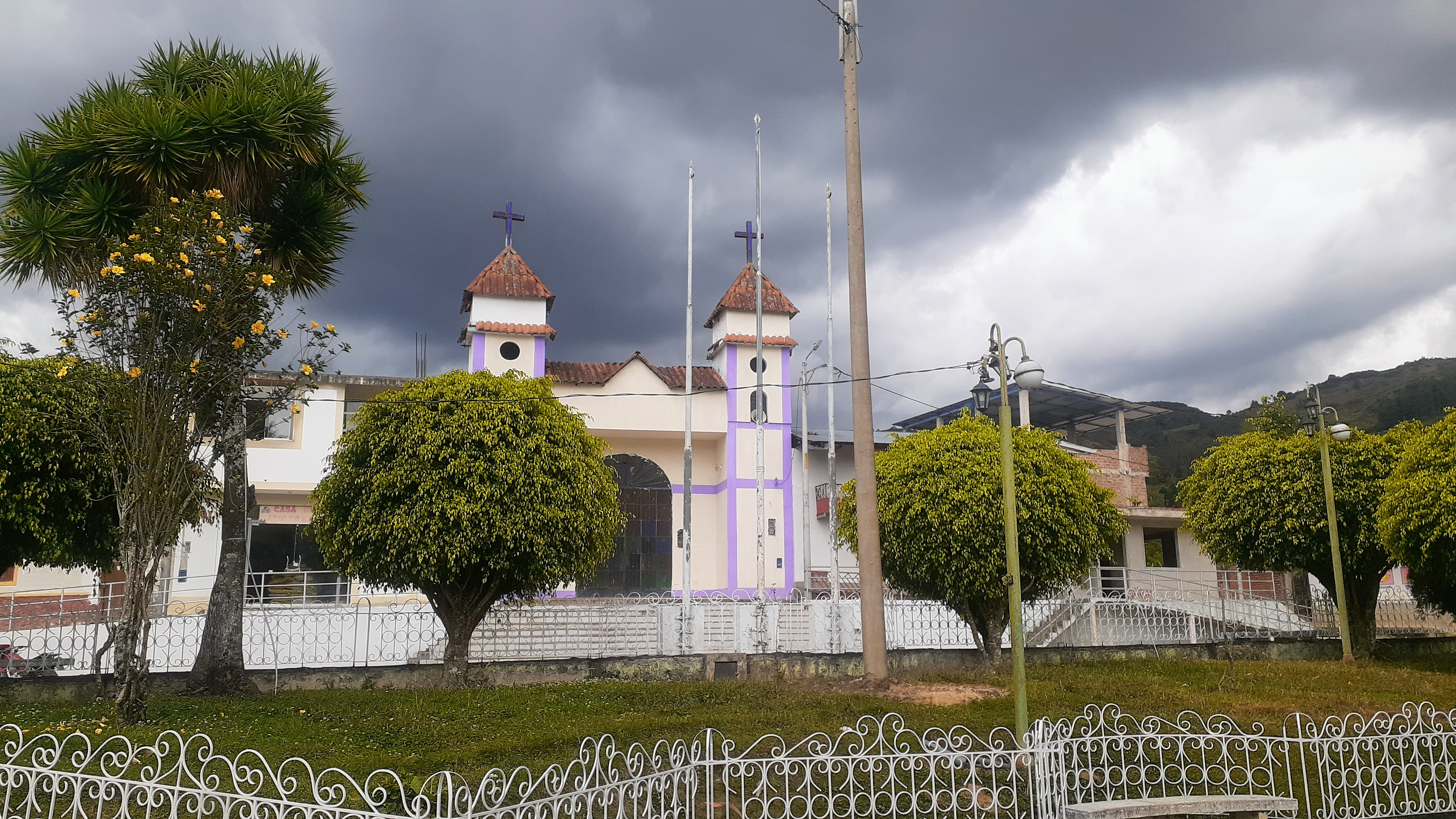
The church of Ninabamba

Ninabamba District is one of eleven districts of the province Santa Cruz in Peru.
