= Yauyucán District =

Coordinates: 6.6767°S 78.8189°W

Yauyucan
- District
- Interactive map of Yauyucan
- Country: Peru
- Region: Cajamarca
- Province: Santa Cruz
- Founded: April 21, 1950
- Capital: Yauyucan

Government
  - Mayor: Mario Wilfredo Vargas Vasquez

Area
  - Total: 35.37 km^{2} (13.66 sq mi)
- Elevation: 2,400 m (7,900 ft)

Population (2005 census)
  - Total: 3,520
  - Density: 99.5/km^{2} (258/sq mi)
- Time zone: UTC-5 (PET)
- UBIGEO: 061311

Yauyucan District is one of eleven districts of the province Santa Cruz in Peru.
