= Pulán District =

Coordinates: 6.7380°S 78.9183°W

Pulan
- District
- Interactive map of Pulan
- Country: Peru
- Region: Cajamarca
- Province: Santa Cruz
- Founded: April 21, 1950
- Capital: Pulan

Government
  - Mayor: Salatiel Romero Malca

Area
  - Total: 155.67 km^{2} (60.10 sq mi)
- Elevation: 2,065 m (6,775 ft)

Population (2005 census)
  - Total: 5,213
  - Density: 33.49/km^{2} (86.73/sq mi)
- Time zone: UTC-5 (PET)
- UBIGEO: 061307

Pulan District is one of eleven districts of the province Santa Cruz in Peru.
