= Chancaybaños Reserved Zone =

Protected area in Peru

Coordinates: 6.5678°S 78.9174°W

The Chancaybaños Reserved Zone (Zona Reservada Chancaybaños) is a protected area in Peru located in the Chancaybaños District, Santa Cruz Province, Cajamarca Region.

== See also ==
- Natural and Cultural Peruvian Heritage
