= Marshal of Peru =

Peruvian army military rank

Grand Marshal of Peru Gran Mariscal del Perú
- Country: Peru
- Service branch: Peruvian Army
- Rank group: General officer
- Rank: Six-star rank
- Non-NATO rank: OF-10
- Formation: 1821

Grand Marshal of Peru (Spanish: Gran Mariscal del Perú), commonly referred as Marshal of Peru, is the highest rank in the Peruvian Army. Unlike the other ranks, it is conferred only to an officer who has been victorious at war.

== List of Marshals of Peru ==
Year	Image	Name
1821		Toribio de Luzuriaga
1823		José Mariano de la Riva Agüero y Sánchez Boquete
1823		Antonio José de Sucre y Alcalá
1823		Mariano Necochea
1823		José de la Mar
1828		Agustín Gamarra Messia
1834		William Miller
1834		Bernardo O'Higgins Riquelme
1834		Domingo Nieto
1834		Ramón Castilla y Marquesado
1834		Miguel de San Román Meza
1919		Andrés Avelino Cáceres Dorregaray
1939		Óscar R. Benavides Larrea
1946		Eloy G. Ureta
1967		Miguel Grau Seminario (posthumous) as Gran Almirante del Perú (Grand Admiral of Peru)
1989		Francisco Bolognesi Cervantes (posthumous)
1991		Jose Abelardo Quiñones (posthumous) as Gran Mariscal del Aire

== See also ==
- Military ranks of Peru
