= Andabamba District, Santa Cruz =

Coordinates: 6.6627°S 78.8173°W

Andabamba Antapampa
- District
- Interactive map of Andabamba
- Country: Peru
- Region: Cajamarca
- Province: Santa Cruz
- Founded: August 21, 1967
- Capital: Andabamba

Government
  - Mayor: José Clodomiro Rojas Tarrillo

Area
  - Total: 7.61 km^{2} (2.94 sq mi)
- Elevation: 2,540 m (8,330 ft)

Population (2005 census)
  - Total: 1,865
  - Density: 245/km^{2} (635/sq mi)
- Time zone: UTC-5 (PET)
- UBIGEO: 061302

Andabamba District is one of eleven districts of the province Santa Cruz in Peru.
