= Cachachi District =

- District
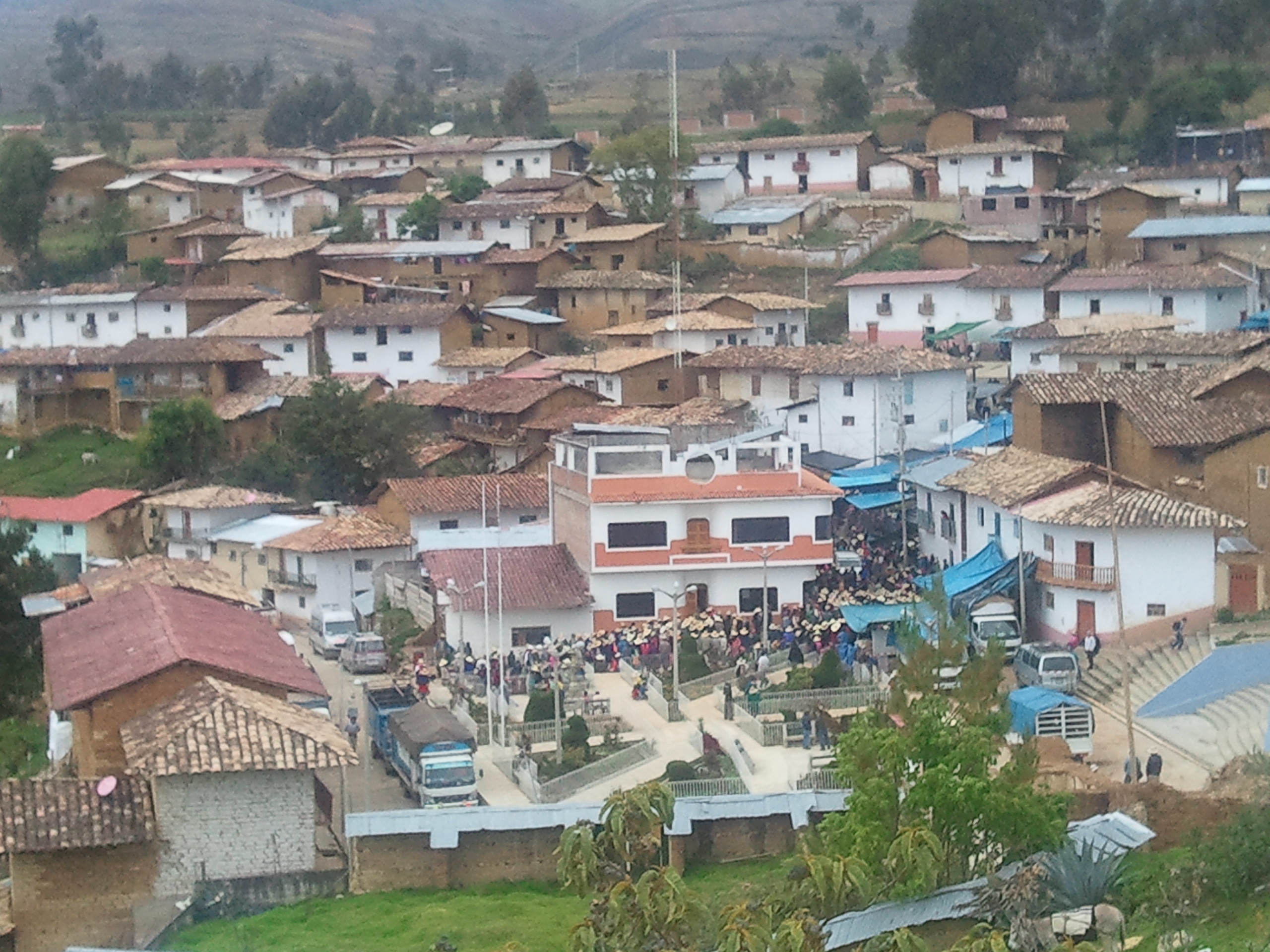
- Cachachi capital
- Interactive map of Cachachi District
- Coordinates: 7.45167°S 78.269103°W
- Country: Peru
- Region: Cajamarca
- Province: Cajabamba
- Founded: February 11, 1855
- Capital: Cachachi

Government
  - Mayor: Enrique Felipe Gamboa Rojas

Area
  - Total: 820.81 km^{2} (316.92 sq mi)
- Elevation: 3,237 m (10,620 ft)

Population (2005 census)
  - Total: 24,865
  - Density: 30.293/km^{2} (78.459/sq mi)
- Time zone: UTC-5 (PET)
- UBIGEO: 060202

Cachachi District is one of the four districts of the province Cajabamba in Peru.
