= Catache District =

Coordinates: 6.6744°S 79.0325°W

Catache
- District
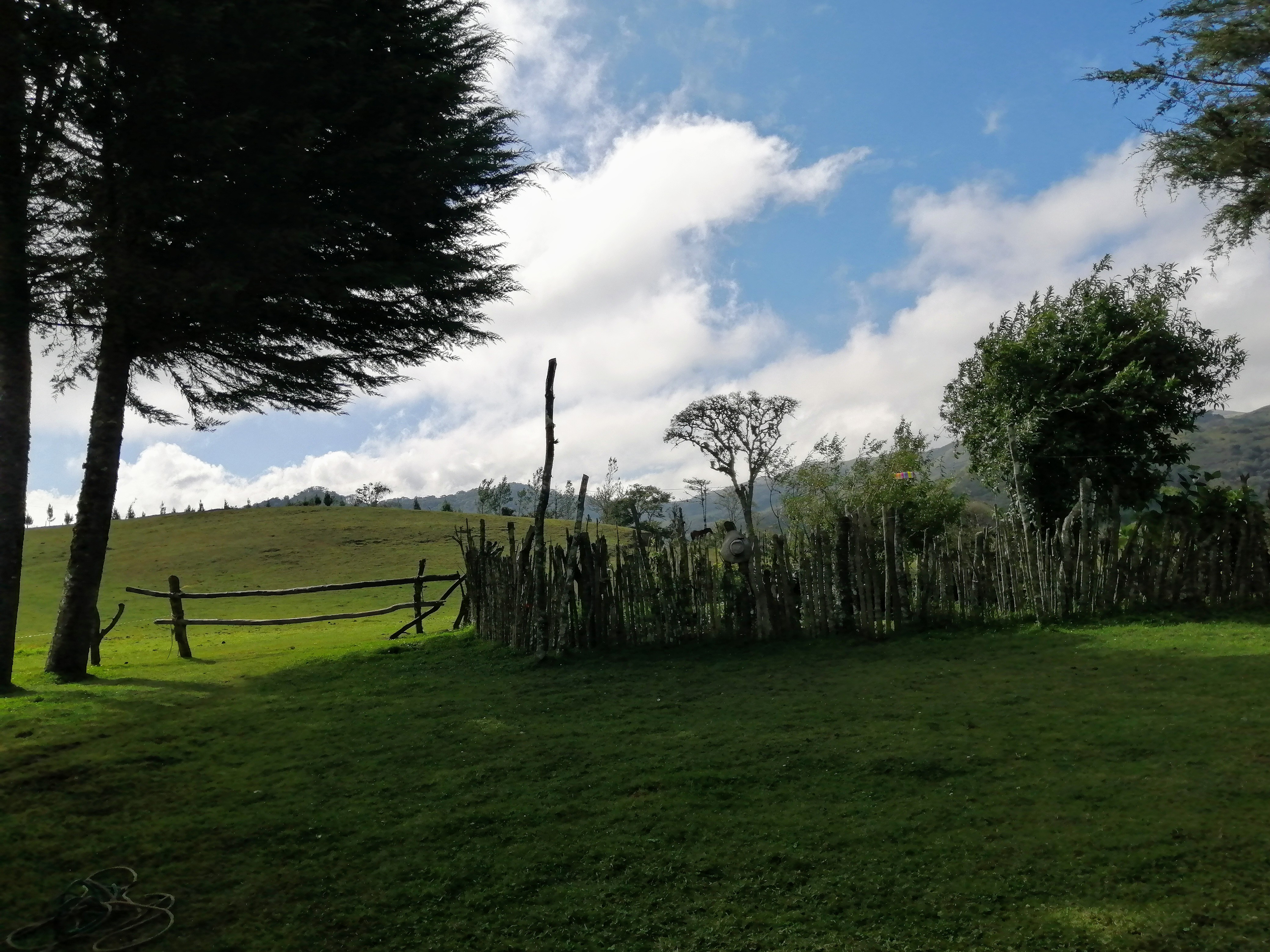
- Interactive map of Catache
- Country: Peru
- Region: Cajamarca
- Province: Santa Cruz
- Founded: April 21, 1950
- Capital: Catache

Government
  - Mayor: Luis Gonzaga Bravo Quiroz

Area
  - Total: 609.16 km^{2} (235.20 sq mi)
- Elevation: 1,355 m (4,446 ft)

Population (2005 census)
  - Total: 9,517
  - Density: 15.62/km^{2} (40.46/sq mi)
- Time zone: UTC-5 (PET)
- UBIGEO: 061303

Catache District is one of eleven districts of the province Santa Cruz in Peru.

== See also ==
- Bosques Nublados de Udima Wildlife Refuge
- Udima
