= Eloy G. Ureta =

Peruvian army officer

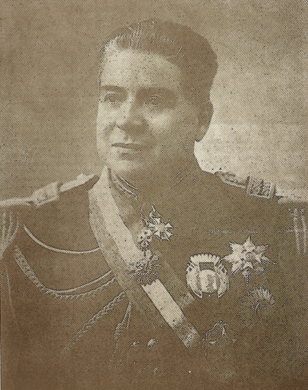
- As Grand Field-Marshal of Peru

Ambassador of Peru to Spain
- In office 1949–1955
- Preceded by: Raúl Porras Barrenechea
- Succeeded by: Felipe Portocarrero Olave

Personal details
- Born: Eloy Gaspar Ureta Montehermoso; December 12, 1892 Chiclayo, Lambayeque, Peru
- Died: October 10, 1965 (aged 72) Madrid, Spain
- Party: Revolutionary Union; Independent Patriotic Legion
- Awards: See list

Military service
- Allegiance: Peru
- Branch/service: Peruvian Army
- Years of service: 1908–1944
- Rank: Brigadier general
- Commands: Northern Army Detachment (1941–1942)
- Battles/wars: 1932 Trujillo uprising Ecuadorian–Peruvian War: Battle of Zarumilla

Eloy Gaspar Ureta Montehermoso (Chiclayo, December 12, 1892 – Madrid, October 10, 1965) was a Peruvian army officer who led the Peruvian Armed Forces to victory in the Ecuadorian–Peruvian War of 1941 for which he was awarded the honorary rank of Grand Marshal of Peru in 1946. His first baptism by fire occurred a decade prior during the 1932 Trujillo uprising in which he was commander of the 1st and 3rd military regiments that participated in the conflict. He ran in the presidential election of 1945, but was defeated by José Bustamante y Rivero. He is considered Patron of the Armored Weapon of the Peruvian Army.

== Biography ==
Ureta was born in Chiclayo, a city in northern Peru, the son of the frigate captain of the Peruvian Navy Gaspar Ureta Ramírez and Mercedes Montehermoso. He did primary studies at the Colegio San José de Chiclayo and secondary at the Colegio Seminario San Carlos and San Marcelo de Trujillo.

In 1908 he entered the Escuela de Clases del Ejército del Perú and in 1909 he entered the Superior Division of the Chorrillos Military School (E.M.CH.) as a Cadet, from where he graduated in 1913 with the rank of alférez. After studying at the Escuela Superior de Guerra (Superior School of War), where he graduated in 1922 as a major, he was sent to Europe for further military education. Ureta was assigned to do advanced studies at the Italian city of Turin, at the schools of Civitavecchia and Bracciano, and then in France, at the officers' schools of Versailles and Coëtquidan and at the advanced artillery school of Mailly.

In 1918 he obtained the rank of captain, in 1936 that of colonel and in 1941, at the outbreak of the armed conflict with Ecuador, that of Brigadier General. He was the director of the Army's War College from 1939 to 1940.

=== Ecuadorian–Peruvian War ===
At the beginning of the conflict in 1941, Ureta commanded the Northern Army Detachment, an army corps made up of two light divisions reinforced with a transmission company, 12 armored vehicles, a group of artillery, 2 cavalry regiments, an infantry battalion, etc. During the offensive that he led on Ecuadorian territory, on July 30, 1941, he ordered an infantry attack supported by armored vehicles on the city of Arenillas, the first use of armored weapons in the Peruvian Army. He was then in charge of the 3rd South Division and was director of the Military School.

=== Post-war career ===
In 1944, Ureta went into retirement. He was later vice president of the Superior Council of the Army, prefect of the departments of Lambayeque and Arequipa and inspector general of the Army.

On January 10, 1946, at the initiative of the Aprista party and with the support of the National Democratic Front, the Congress of the Republic of Peru conferred on him the honorary military rank of Grand Marshal of Peru, for his services in the 1941 military campaign, through of a law that was promulgated on January 18, 1946, by the Government. Ureta would be the last General Officer to achieve that distinction in the military history of Peru and that it was granted before to José de la Riva Agüero, Ramón Castilla, Andrés A. Cáceres and Óscar R. Benavides.

On May 28, 1946, in a special ceremony, with a parade and military parade of honor, held in the Campo de Marte, the President of the Republic, Dr. José Luis Bustamante y Rivero, presented Ureta with the baton of Grand Marshal of Peru.

He was the presidential candidate of the Independent Patriotic Legion in the 1945 general elections, in which he obtained second place with 33% of the votes.

In 1949, replacing Raúl Porras Barrenechea, the military government of Manuel A. Odría appointed him ambassador to Spain, a position he held until 1955, the year in which he withdrew from all public activity for health reasons. During his tenure, he personally condecorated Generalisimo Francisco Franco with the Military Order of Ayacucho in a ceremony held on February 1, 1951.

He died at his residence in Madrid, Spain on October 10, 1965, at the age of 72. His remains were repatriated to his country and he was buried at the Presbítero Matías Maestro Cemetery in Lima in a mausoleum designed by sculptor Antonio Ocaña. He was married to Consuelo Ureta, with whom he had three children: Eloy, José Luis and Mercedes Ureta y Ureta.

A number of streets and places in Peru, as well as the 68th Promotion of Officers that graduated on December 16, 2011, from the EMCH, bear his name.

== Awards ==
- Grand Cross of the Military Order of Ayacucho, Peru (for distinguished action)
- Grand Cross of the Order of the Sun, Peru
- Commander of the Order of Glory, France
- Commander of the Legion of Merit, United States
- Commander of the Order of Military Merit, Cuba
- Commander of the Order of Military Merit, Chile.
- Commander of the Order of the Legion of Honour, France
- Grand Cross of the Order of the Liberator, Argentina
- First Class of the Peruvian Grand Cross of Aviation, Peru
- Grand Cross of the Order of Merit for Distinguished Service, Peru

== Bibliography ==
- Eloy G. Ureta, Trayectoria de una vida, Editorial Jurídica, 1973
- Eloy G. Ureta, Apuntes sobre una campaña, s/e, Madrid, 1953

== See also ==
- Marshal of Peru
