= Order of Military Merit (Cuba) =

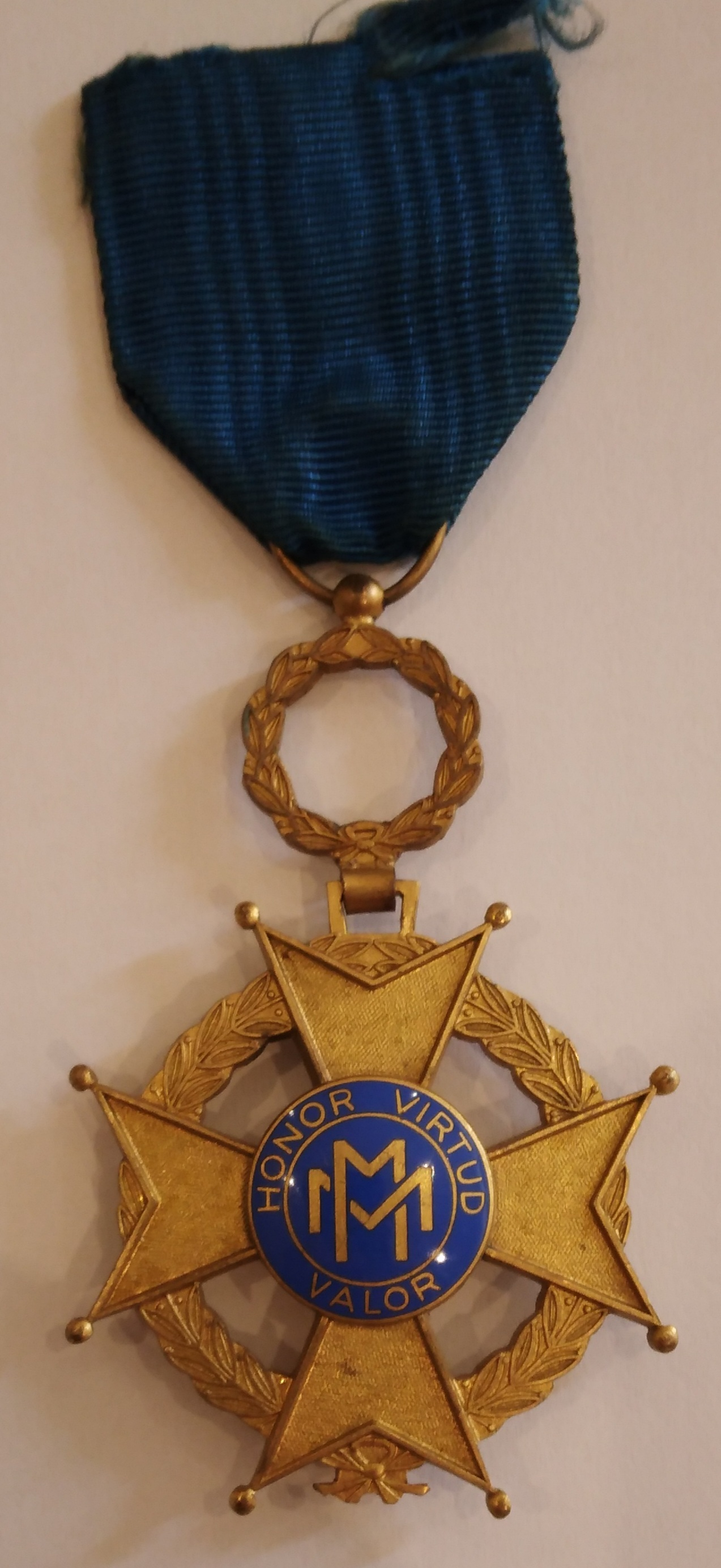
- 4th class cross for good conduct
- Awarded for: Military Merit
- Country: Cuba
- Obverse: Two interlaced Latin Ms, surrounded by the order's motto, set upon a Maltese cross wreathed in oak
- Reverse: Coat of Arms of Cuba set in a circle
- Motto: Honor, Virtud, Valor (Honour, Virtue, Valour)
- Status: Defunct
- Established: 27 February 1912
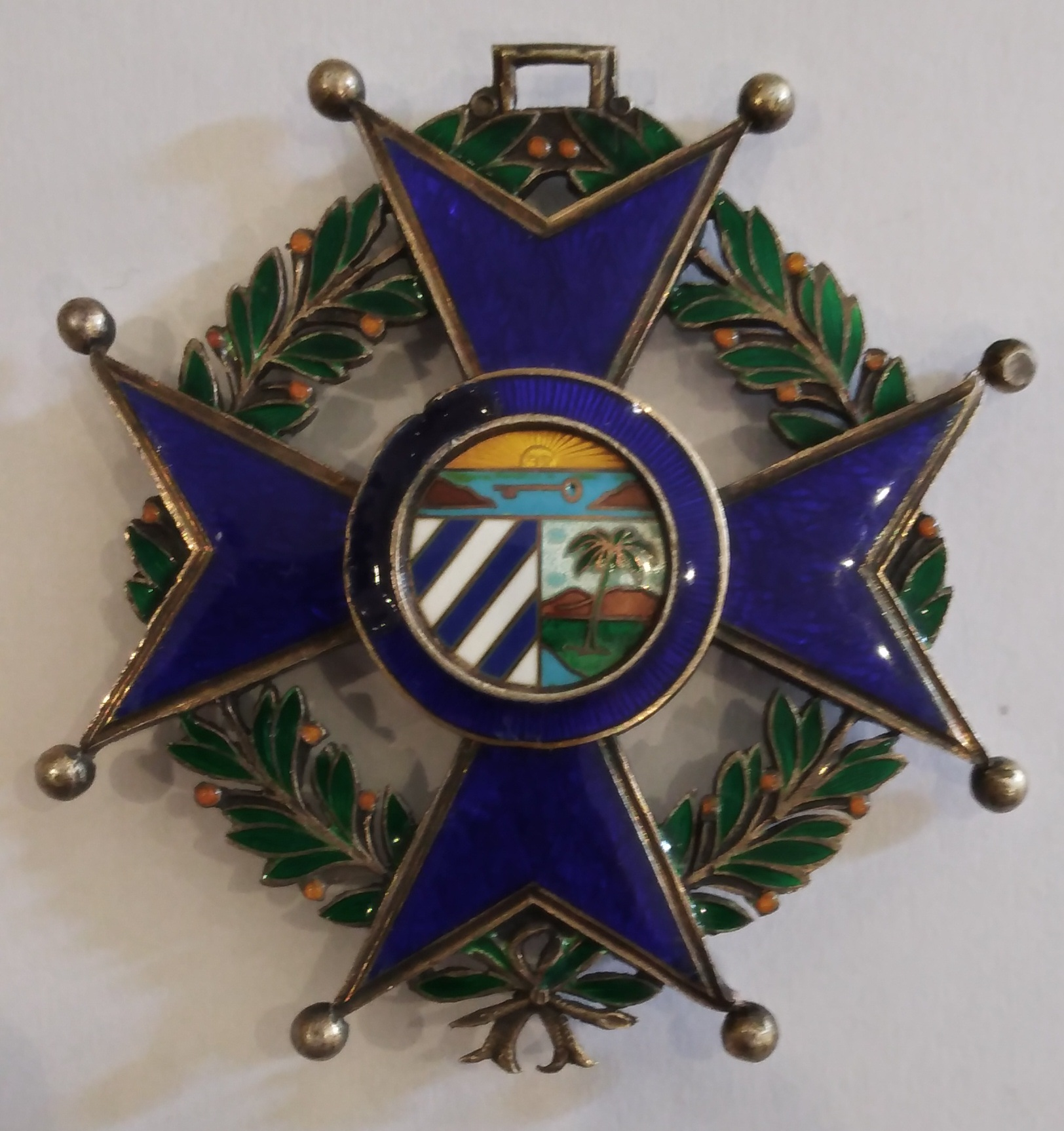
- reverse of the 3rd class cross for good conduct

The Cuban Order of Military Merit (Spanish: Orden Mérito Militar) was an order of merit awarded by the Republic of Cuba for military deeds. It was awarded in six categories, which were differentiated by the colours of their ribbon and enamel, similar to its inspiration, the Spanish Order of Military Merit. After the Victory of the Cuban Revolution, the Order was suppressed by Law No. 13.

== History ==
The order was founded on February 27, 1912, by Presidential Decree number 196, promulgated by President José Miguel Gómez, it was intended to reward officers and NCOs of the Cuban Army and its allies, notably the US Army for a variety of services to the Cuban Republic. It was subdivided into four classes: first class for General Officers, which was a breast star in gold, second class for Senior Officers, which was a silver breast star otherwise identical to 1st class, third class for Junior Officers which was a richly enamelled chest medal constructed of several parts, examples of 3rd class awards where the cross was gilded instead of enamelled also exist, and fourth class for NCOs, which was much more sparsely adorned and constructed out of a single piece, with less detailed oak leaves surrounding the cross.

== Notable Recipients ==
- Valery Harvard
- Eloy G. Ureta
- Charles Summerall
- Jean de Lattre de Tassigny
- George C. Marshall
- Malin Craig
- Leon Kromer
- John B. Coulter
- Fulgencio Batista

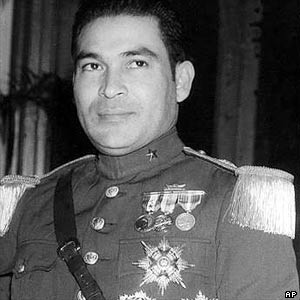
Major General Fulgencio Batista wearing his 1st class star of the order

== Categories ==
Categories are unlisted.

Award	Award criteria
	For Good Conduct
	For Conspicuous Service
	For Other Services deemed meritorious
	For Special Services deemed meritorious
	For Military Merit
	For Humanitarian Acts

== See also ==
- Orders, decorations, and medals of Cuba
- Order of Naval Merit (Cuba)
