= Udima =

Village in Santa Cruz Province, Peru

Coordinates: 6.81°S 79.09°W

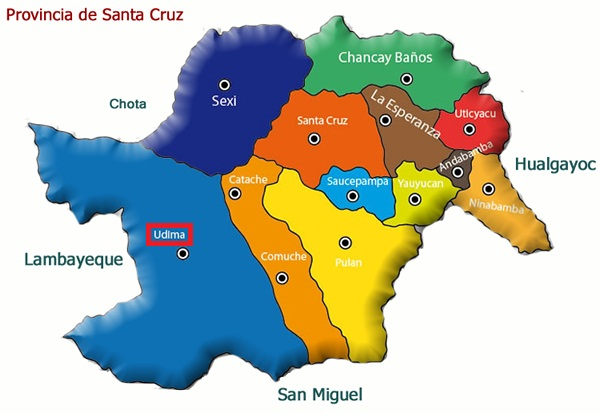
A map of Santa Cruz province showing Udima

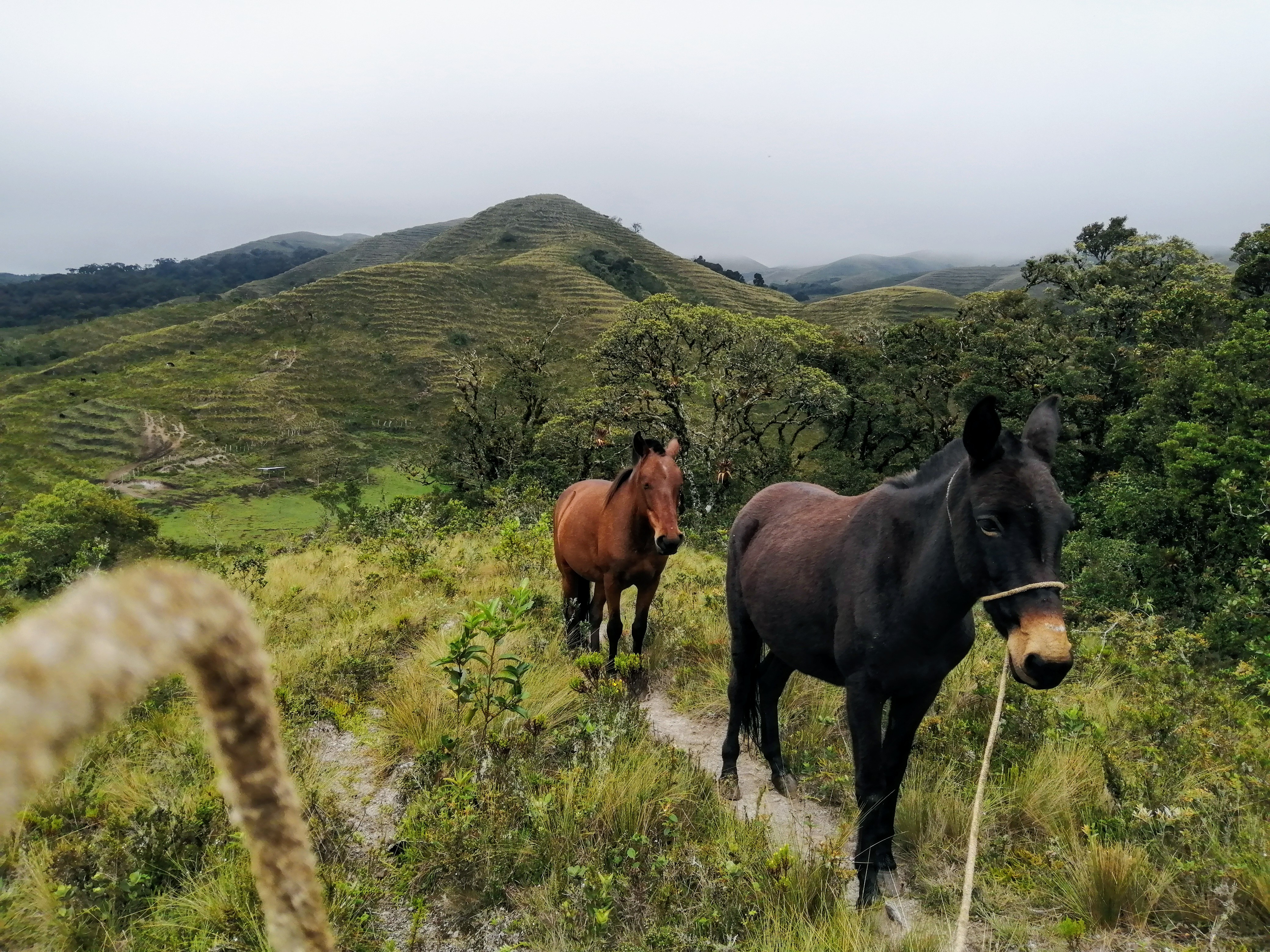
The countryside near Udima

Udima (formerly known as Hacienda Udima and Udima Ayacos) is a village in Catache District of Santa Cruz Province in the Department of Cajamarca, Peru. In 2017, Udima had a population of 696. Located in the Andes mountains, Udima has an elevation of about 2,365 m (7,759 ft) according to Google Earth. The village is adjacent to the Bosques Nublados de Udima (Cloud Forests of Udima) Wildlife Refuge

== Geography ==
Udima is located on the headwaters of one of the tributaries of the Zaña River which flows to the Pacific Ocean. The Andes rise only to relatively low elevations near Udima. In most areas of Peru the cold, dry temperatures of the high Andes result in different species of flora and fauna in the humid, tropical Amazon rainforest to the east and the much drier western slopes of the Andes. The low elevations in the Udima region allow plants and animals characteristic of the Amazon to also flourish on the western side of the Andes. This unique biosystem is protected in the Bosques Nublados de Udima Wildlife Refuge. Sub-tropical forests with many Amazonian species are found in the refuge at elevations of 2,000 m (6,600 ft) and higher on the western slopes of the Andes. Below that elevation on the western slope, precipitation is too low for Amazonian species to thrive.

=== Climate ===
Udima has a highland Csb climate (sub-tropical, dry and mild summers) in the Köppen climate classification system and a Csll climate (sub-tropical, dry summer, mild temperatures in every month) in the Trewartha climate classification system. Average maximum daily temperatures vary only about 2 degrees C (4 degrees F) between the warmest and coldest months. Precipitation is greatest from February through April. June to September are dry months.

Climate data for Udima (1991–2020)
| Month | Jan | Feb | Mar | Apr | May | Jun | Jul | Aug | Sep | Oct | Nov | Dec | Year |
|---|---|---|---|---|---|---|---|---|---|---|---|---|---|
| Mean daily maximum °C (°F) | 18.2 (64.8) | 17.9 (64.2) | 18.4 (65.1) | 18.7 (65.7) | 19.5 (67.1) | 20.0 (68.0) | 20.1 (68.2) | 20.6 (69.1) | 20.4 (68.7) | 19.0 (66.2) | 18.7 (65.7) | 18.3 (64.9) | 19.2 (66.6) |
| Mean daily minimum °C (°F) | 11.1 (52.0) | 11.2 (52.2) | 11.6 (52.9) | 11.6 (52.9) | 11.6 (52.9) | 11.4 (52.5) | 11.0 (51.8) | 11.2 (52.2) | 11.4 (52.5) | 11.0 (51.8) | 10.6 (51.1) | 10.8 (51.4) | 11.2 (52.2) |
| Average precipitation mm (inches) | 83.7 (3.30) | 140.8 (5.54) | 246.7 (9.71) | 154.7 (6.09) | 63.4 (2.50) | 26.8 (1.06) | 16.7 (0.66) | 11.1 (0.44) | 38.4 (1.51) | 61.6 (2.43) | 38.6 (1.52) | 57.6 (2.27) | 950.1 (37.41) |
Source: National Meteorology and Hydrology Service of Peru

== History ==
The archaeological site of Poro Poro is located about 8 km (5.0 miles) northeast of Udima near the hamlet of the same name (also known as La Grada). Archaeologist Walter Alva first excavated the ruin in 1979 and dated it to the pre-Chavin era about 1,500 BCE. The extensive site features rocks carved into "pulpits and "thrones," monumental columns, a sunken plaza, and subterranean canals.

In the 19th century, Udima was part of the extensive estate of Miguel Iglesias (1830–1909) who became President of Peru. In 1920, the Iglesias family sold the Hacienda Udima, consisting of 40,000 ha (99,000 acres), to the "Widow of Piedra and children." In the 1970s and 1980s the government's agrarian reform program distributed much of the land belonging to the hacienda to 512 resident farmers who formed a cooperative. Most of the land has since been converted into privately owned, small and medium-sized farms.
