= Chancaybaños District =

Coordinates: 6°35′8″S 78°53′49″W

Chancaybaños
- District
- Interactive map of Chancaybaños
- Country: Peru
- Region: Cajamarca
- Province: Santa Cruz
- Founded: September 18, 1942
- Capital: Chancaybaños

Government
  - Mayor: Orlandini Davila Davila

Area
  - Total: 120.04 km^{2} (46.35 sq mi)
- Elevation: 1,625 m (5,331 ft)

Population (2005 census)
  - Total: 3,942
  - Density: 32.84/km^{2} (85.05/sq mi)
- Time zone: UTC-5 (PET)
- UBIGEO: 061304

Chancaybaños District is one of eleven districts of the province Santa Cruz in Peru.

== Places of interest ==
- Chancaybaños Reserved Zone
