= Búfalos =

Paramilitary squad linked to APRA in Peru

Búfalos ('The Buffaloes') is the name attributed to paramilitary squads connected to the APRA Party in Peru, originating in the 1930s. The name of the group was taken from Manuel 'Bufálo' Barreto, who had led an attack on the O'Donovan military base in 1932. Búfalos have traditionally acted as bodyguards of APRA leaders. In the discourse of APRA chief Victor Raúl Haya de la Torre, búfalos would be responsible for crowd control during mass rallies.

Búfalos were first organized by the then APRA general secretary Armando Villanueva. Búfalos carried arm-bands with the five-point star party symbol.

The height of búfalo activism was during the formative years of the party, 1930-1948, as búfalo cells engaged in assassinations and acts of terror. As the APRA party came under attack from the military, búfalos conducted counter-attacks (including the high-profile assassination of Luis Miguel Sánchez Cerro in 1933). Bufálos also used to intimidate leftist trade unionists and intellectuals. The groups also organized local protection rackets. In the coastal plantation areas, búfalos engaged in violent strike-breaking.

Búfalo activity did however continue, allegedly during election campaigns in the 1960s. When Alan García took over as APRA general secretary in 1982, he began curbing búfalo activities in a move to clean up the image of the party.

The fact that APRA maintained paramilitary violent shock troops during the interwar era has been cited as an indication amongst scholars that APRA could be classified as a fascist party during that period. It has also been argued that the búfalo experience of 1930-1948 provided the 1980s Sendero Luminoso guerrilla movement with an endogenous model for 'People's War' in Peru.
