= Sexi District =

Coordinates: 6°33′49″S 79°03′05″W

Sexi Siqsi
- District
- Interactive map of Sexi
- Country: Peru
- Region: Cajamarca
- Province: Santa Cruz
- Founded: September 18, 1942
- Capital: Sexi

Government
  - Mayor: Celer Froilan Perales Perez

Area
  - Total: 192.87 km^{2} (74.47 sq mi)
- Elevation: 2,495 m (8,186 ft)

Population (2005 census)
  - Total: 450
  - Density: 2.3/km^{2} (6.0/sq mi)
- Time zone: UTC-5 (PET)
- UBIGEO: 061309

Sexi District is one of eleven districts of the province Santa Cruz in northern Peru. Chiclayo is the nearest metropolitan center to the east of Sexi, from which one may travel by car or bus to the district.

The small town of Sexi is located in this district. The town is situated near a petrified forest, El Bosque Petrificado Piedra Chamana (The Petrified Forest Piedra Chamana). The fossils that are there date to the Eocene epoch (~39 Ma), and the forest contains fossilized wood and leaves. Guided tours of the petrified forest are available and there is a museum dedicated to the fossils in the town.
