= Uticyacu District =

Coordinates: 6.6076°S 78.7928°W

Uticyacu Utiqyaku
- District
- Interactive map of Uticyacu
- Country: Peru
- Region: Cajamarca
- Province: Santa Cruz
- Founded: October 1, 1941
- Capital: Uticyacu

Government
  - Mayor: Pepe Alarcón Vasquez

Area
  - Total: 43.38 km^{2} (16.75 sq mi)
- Elevation: 2,312 m (7,585 ft)

Population (2005 census)
  - Total: 1,668
  - Density: 38.45/km^{2} (99.59/sq mi)
- Time zone: UTC-5 (PET)
- UBIGEO: 061310

Uticyacu District is one of eleven districts of the province Santa Cruz in Peru.
