= Condebamba District =

Coordinates: 7.5736°S 78.0696°W

Condebamba
- District
- Interactive map of Condebamba
- Country: Peru
- Region: Cajamarca
- Province: Cajabamba
- Founded: February 11, 1855
- Capital: Cauday

Government
  - Mayor: Jose Marcelo Gamboa Hilario

Area
  - Total: 204.6 km^{2} (79.0 sq mi)
- Elevation: 2,829 m (9,281 ft)

Population (2005 census)
  - Total: 14,214
  - Density: 69.47/km^{2} (179.9/sq mi)
- Time zone: UTC-5 (PET)
- UBIGEO: 060203

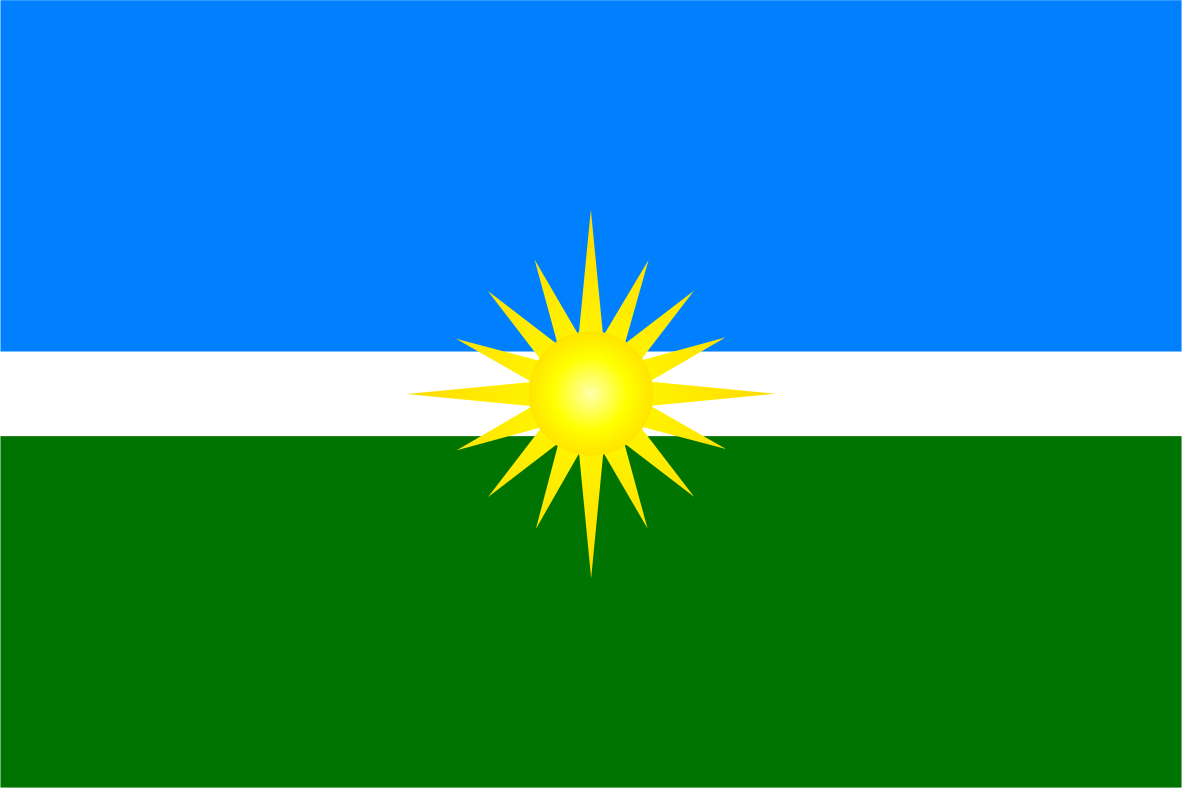

Condebamba District is one of the four districts of the Cajabamba province in Peru.
