= Toribio de Luzuriaga =

Peruvian-Argentine soldier

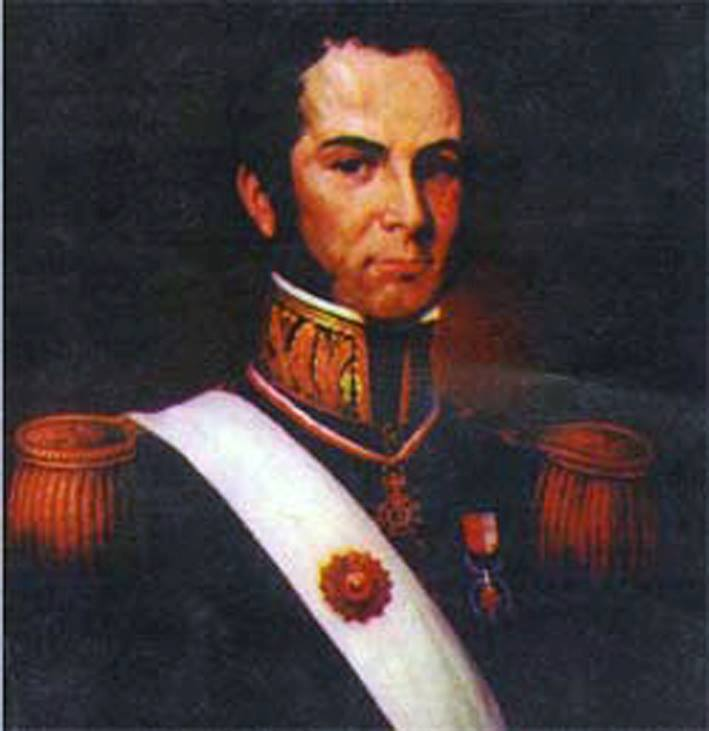

Personal details
- Born: 16 March 1782; Huaraz, Peru
- Died: 1 May 1842 (aged 60); Pergamino, Argentina

Toribio de Luzuriaga y Mejía (16 April 1782 – 1 May 1842) was a Peruvian-Argentine soldier and the first Grand Marshal of Peru.

== Biography ==
Born in Huaraz on 16 April 1782, Toribio de Luzuriaga was the son of Manuel de Luzuriaga y Elgarreta, a Basque merchant from Biscay, and María Josefa Mejía de Estrada.

In 1797, he worked as private secretary to Gabriel de Avilés y del Fierro, promoted Captain general of Chile and then Viceroy of the Río de la Plata in 1799. When Gabriel de Avilés was appointed Viceroy of Peru in 1801, Luzuriaga preferred to remain in Buenos Aires and decided to embrace a military career by entering the cavalry volunteer regiment of Buenos Aires. He distinguished himself during the British invasions of the River Plate and was taken prisoner by the English in 1806.

In 1810, he joined the regiment of dragoons of Buenos Aires, just at the time of the May Revolution. He participated in the military campaigns against the Spanish royalists in Upper Peru, then in 1812 was appointed governor of the Corrientes Province. In 1815 he became a general and the following year he accompanied the liberator José de San Martín with the Army of the Andes in order to liberate Chile from Spanish domination. Between 1817 and 1820, he was governor of the Cuyo Province. He again followed San Martín to Peru in 1821, who appointed him president of the Huaylas prefecture. On 21 December 1821, he was made Grand Marshal of Peru.

With the departure of José de San Martín from Peru, Luzuriaga lost his main supporter and decided to return to Argentina and retire from public life.
Fallen into oblivion and poverty, he died in Pergamino, in the province of Buenos Aires, on 1 May 1842 by shooting himself in the head.

As a tribute, the Mariscal Luzuriaga Province in the Department of Ancash of Peru bears his name.
