= Independent Patriotic Legion =

Political party in Peru

Independent Patriotic Legion (in Spanish: Legión Patriótica Independiente), was a political party in Peru, founded in 1944, in order to launch the presidential campaign of Eloy G. Ureta.
