= Saucepampa District =

Coordinates: 6.6906°S 78.9183°W

Saucepampa Sawsipampa
- District
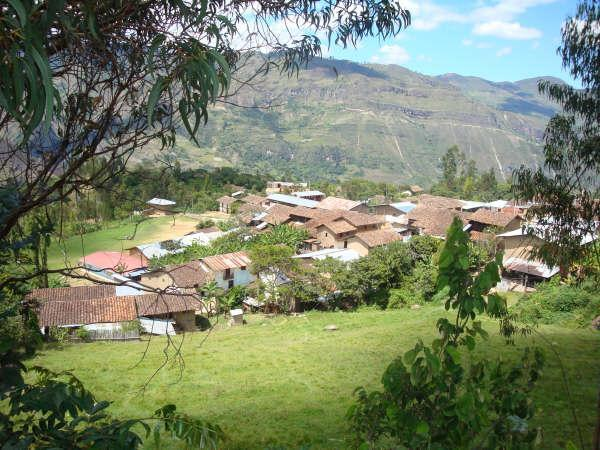
- Interactive map of Saucepampa
- Country: Peru
- Region: Cajamarca
- Province: Santa Cruz
- Founded: September 1, 1989
- Capital: Saucepampa

Government
  - Mayor: Ernesto Suxe Palomino

Area
  - Total: 31.58 km^{2} (12.19 sq mi)
- Elevation: 1,875 m (6,152 ft)

Population (2005 census)
  - Total: 2,079
  - Density: 65.83/km^{2} (170.5/sq mi)
- Time zone: UTC-5 (PET)
- UBIGEO: 061308

Saucepampa or Sawsipampa (Quechua) is one of eleven districts of the province Santa Cruz in Peru.
