= Santa Cruz District, Santa Cruz =

Coordinates: 6.6259°S 78.9450°W

Santa Cruz
- District
- Interactive map of Santa Cruz
- Country: Peru
- Region: Cajamarca
- Province: Santa Cruz
- Capital: Santa Cruz de Succhubamba

Government
  - Mayor: Manuel Apolinar Ruiz Bravo

Area
  - Total: 102.51 km^{2} (39.58 sq mi)
- Elevation: 2,035 m (6,677 ft)

Population (2005 census)
  - Total: 9,627
  - Density: 93.91/km^{2} (243.2/sq mi)
- Time zone: UTC-5 (PET)
- UBIGEO: 061301

Santa Cruz District is one of eleven districts of the province Santa Cruz in Peru. According to the 2005 census, the district has a total population of 9,627 inhabitants.
