= Sitacocha District =

Coordinates: 7.5224°S 77.9707°W

Sitacocha
- District
- Interactive map of Sitacocha
- Country: Peru
- Region: Cajamarca
- Province: Cajabamba
- Founded: February 11, 1855
- Capital: Lluchubamba

Government
  - Mayor: German Valladares Guerra

Area
  - Total: 589.94 km^{2} (227.78 sq mi)
- Elevation: 2,956 m (9,698 ft)

Population (2005 census)
  - Total: 9,472
  - Density: 16.06/km^{2} (41.58/sq mi)
- Time zone: UTC-5 (PET)
- UBIGEO: 060204

Sitacocha District is one of the four districts of the province Cajabamba in Peru.

== See also ==
- Yawarqucha
