= La Esperanza District, Santa Cruz =

Coordinates: 6.5919°S 78.8957°W

La Esperanza
- District
- Interactive map of La Esperanza
- Country: Peru
- Region: Cajamarca
- Province: Santa Cruz
- Founded: April 23, 1923
- Capital: La Esperanza

Government
  - Mayor: José Marino Diaz Alarcon

Area
  - Total: 59.7 km^{2} (23.1 sq mi)
- Elevation: 1,700 m (5,600 ft)

Population (2005 census)
  - Total: 3,116
  - Density: 52.2/km^{2} (135/sq mi)
- Time zone: UTC-5 (PET)
- UBIGEO: 061305

La Esperanza District is one of eleven districts of the province Santa Cruz in Peru.
