= Lake Quengococha =

Lake in Peru

Quengococha
- Location within Peru
- Location: Peru; Cajamarca Region
- Coordinates: 7°37′32″S 77°57′30″W

Quengococha (possibly from Quechua q'inqu zig-zag qucha lake, "zig-zag lake") is a lake in Peru located in the Cajamarca Region, Cajabamba Province, Cajabamba District, in the east of the Cajabamba District. Quengococha lies southeast of the lake Yaguarcocha.
