= Cajabamba, Colombia =

Coordinates: 1°26′N 77°4′W

Cajabamba
- Vereda
- Location of the vereda of Cajabamba in the Nariño Department of Colombia.
- Country: Colombia
- Department: Nariño
- Time zone: UTC-5 (Colombia Standard Time)

Cajabamba is one of 30 administrative regions in the Nariño Department, Colombia. It is a rural vereda touching the municipality of Consacá.
