= Bosques Nublados de Udima Wildlife Refuge =

Wildlife reserve in Peru

- Refugio de Vida Silvestre Bosques Nublados de Udima
- IUCN category IV (habitat/species management area)
- Location within Peru
- Location: Peru; Cajamarca
- Coordinates: 6°50′41″S 79°2′11″W
- Area: 12,183.2 hectares (47.04 sq mi)
- Established: 21 July 2011
- Governing body: SERNANP
- Website: Bosques Nublados de Udima

Bosques Nublados de Udima Wildlife Refuge (Cloud Forests of Udima Wildlife Refuge) is a protected area of 12,183 hectares (30,100 acres) located in the regions of Cajamarca and Lambayeque, Peru. The Refuge protects the flora and fauna of Andean cloud forests at elevations mostly between 2,000 metres (6,600 ft) and 3,000 metres (9,800 ft). The cloud forests are the headwaters for rivers providing water for downstream irrigation of farmland. The Refuge also preserves pre-Columbian archaeological ruins.

== Description ==
The Cloud Forest Refuge is located mostly in the headwaters of the Zaña River with a small non-contiguous section along the Chancay River and another small non-contiguous section protecting the archaeological site of Poro Poro. The main section consists of the steep slopes of an escarpment dropping sharply more than 1,000 metres (3,300 ft) in elevation from a dissected plateau to the Zaña River. The semi-tropical forests in this section, found at elevations above 2,000 metres (6,600 ft), are the distinguishing feature of the Refuge. The forests are found between the desert coasts of western Peru and the rainforests of the Amazon Basin to the east. The Andes are relatively low in elevation near the Refuge and plant and animal species characteristic of the Amazon rain forest are atypically found here on the western slopes of the Andes. The Peruvian government recognized the uniqueness of the forests in 2010 by creating the "Reserved Zone of Udima" consisting of 30,503 hectares (75,370 acres) of land. The Refuge of more than 12,000 hectares was carved out of the lands of the Reserved Zone in 2011.

The Zaña River flowing westward out of the Refuge to the Pacific Ocean supplies irrigation water to an important agricultural valley, especially for sugar cane, centered on the town of Zaña (also spelled Saña). The Zaña River valley, overlooked by the Refuge, contains many pre-Columbian archaeological sites, including the oldest known irrigation canals in the Americas. The canals are dated to 3400 BCE and possibly are as old as 4700 BCE.

Most of the Refuge is located in the Catache District of Santa Cruz Province in Cajamarca Region. The village of Udima, formerly known as Hacienda Udima, elevation 2,365 metres (7,759 ft), is the nearest populated place, about 2 kilometres (1.2 miles) north of the border of the Refuge. Udima had a population of 696 in 2017. The highest elevation in the Refuge is 3,367 metres (11,047 ft).
