= 1st Military Region =

1st Military Region may refer to:

- 1st Military Region (Algeria)
- 1st Military Region (People's Army of Vietnam)
- 1st Military Region (Yemen)
- First Military Region (Yugoslavia)
