= Consaca =

Coordinates: 1°12′N 77°28′W

- Municipality and town
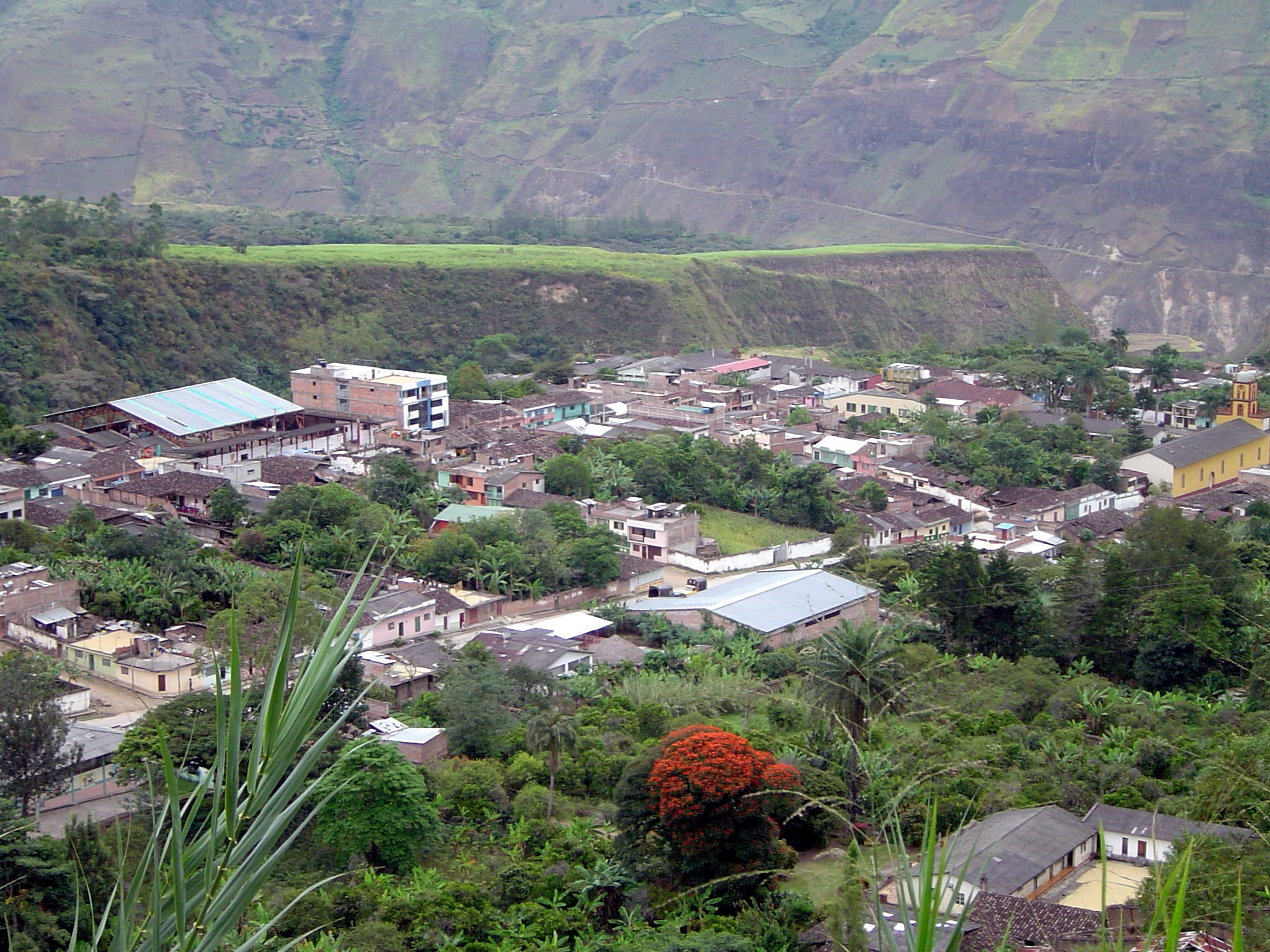

- Flag Seal

- Location of the municipality and town of Consaca in the Nariño Department of Colombia.
- Country: Colombia
- Department: Nariño Department
- Time zone: UTC-5 (Colombia Standard Time)

Consaca is a town and municipality in the Nariño Department, Colombia. It is a town and municipality of Nariño Colombia, and has 12.639 inhabitants. Consaca is located near the Galeras Volcano and is 54 Kilometers away by car from the city San Juan de Pasto. Consaca is known by the name "Historical corner of Colombia".

== Tourism ==
The nearby "Green Lake" is a place of surrounded by exotic flora and fauna, the color green is due to the amount of sulphur in the water.

The Bolivar Monument (Piedra de Bolivar) is located in Bombona, 6 km away from the town center and it is a place of historical importance for Colombia owing to the event that took place on 7 April 1822 during Simon Bolivar's battle for the Liberty.

== Veredas ==
Consacá comprises 30 veredas

San Rafael, Churupamba, Hatillo Bajo, Santa Inés, Caracol, Hatillo Alto, Cariaco Alto, Campamento, Villa Inéz, Jossepe, El Juncal, Villa Rosa, Cariaco Bajo, La Aguada, San José del Salado, Alto Bomboná, Tinajillas, El Guabo, Ciudadela Bomboná, Veracruz, Brisas del Guáitara, San Antonio, La Loma, El Edén, Rumipamba, Cajabamba, Paltapamba, El Tejar y El Cucho.

== Climate ==
Climate data for Consaca (Bombona), elevation 1,493 m (4,898 ft), (1981–2010)
Month	Jan	Feb	Mar	Apr	May	Jun	Jul	Aug	Sep	Oct	Nov	Dec	Year
Mean daily maximum °C (°F)	25.2 (77.4)	25.5 (77.9)	25.7 (78.3)	25.3 (77.5)	25.3 (77.5)	25.6 (78.1)	26.3 (79.3)	27.1 (80.8)	27.2 (81.0)	26.2 (79.2)	24.9 (76.8)	24.9 (76.8)	25.8 (78.4)
Daily mean °C (°F)	19.4 (66.9)	19.6 (67.3)	19.8 (67.6)	19.7 (67.5)	19.8 (67.6)	20.0 (68.0)	20.5 (68.9)	20.8 (69.4)	20.4 (68.7)	19.8 (67.6)	19.4 (66.9)	19.3 (66.7)	19.9 (67.8)
Mean daily minimum °C (°F)	14.9 (58.8)	15.1 (59.2)	15.4 (59.7)	15.5 (59.9)	15.5 (59.9)	15.1 (59.2)	14.8 (58.6)	15.0 (59.0)	14.8 (58.6)	14.9 (58.8)	15.1 (59.2)	15.4 (59.7)	15.1 (59.2)
Average precipitation mm (inches)	101.7 (4.00)	92.7 (3.65)	102.5 (4.04)	126.8 (4.99)	90.3 (3.56)	46.4 (1.83)	28.8 (1.13)	22.8 (0.90)	51.6 (2.03)	121.6 (4.79)	139.2 (5.48)	141.1 (5.56)	1,065.4 (41.94)
Average precipitation days	16	15	17	20	18	12	9	6	10	18	20	20	178
Average relative humidity (%)	82	81	81	83	82	78	71	69	73	80	83	84	79
Mean monthly sunshine hours	142.6	124.2	120.9	123.0	139.5	156.0	179.8	182.9	153.0	142.6	138.0	142.6	1,745.1
Mean daily sunshine hours	4.6	4.4	3.9	4.1	4.5	5.2	5.8	5.9	5.1	4.6	4.6	4.6	4.8
Source: Instituto de Hidrologia Meteorologia y Estudios Ambientales

Climate data for Consaca (Ospina Perez), elevation 1,700 m (5,600 ft), (1981–2010)
Month	Jan	Feb	Mar	Apr	May	Jun	Jul	Aug	Sep	Oct	Nov	Dec	Year
Mean daily maximum °C (°F)	24.8 (76.6)	25.1 (77.2)	25.5 (77.9)	24.8 (76.6)	24.7 (76.5)	25.3 (77.5)	26.0 (78.8)	26.4 (79.5)	26.1 (79.0)	24.8 (76.6)	24.6 (76.3)	24.6 (76.3)	25.2 (77.4)
Daily mean °C (°F)	19.1 (66.4)	19.4 (66.9)	19.6 (67.3)	19.4 (66.9)	19.3 (66.7)	19.7 (67.5)	20.0 (68.0)	20.2 (68.4)	19.8 (67.6)	19.1 (66.4)	18.9 (66.0)	19.0 (66.2)	19.5 (67.1)
Mean daily minimum °C (°F)	15.0 (59.0)	15.1 (59.2)	15.3 (59.5)	15.3 (59.5)	15.2 (59.4)	15.0 (59.0)	14.6 (58.3)	14.9 (58.8)	14.7 (58.5)	14.8 (58.6)	14.8 (58.6)	14.8 (58.6)	15.0 (59.0)
Average precipitation mm (inches)	107.6 (4.24)	107.3 (4.22)	130.8 (5.15)	187.8 (7.39)	142.5 (5.61)	78.0 (3.07)	50.7 (2.00)	45.2 (1.78)	89.0 (3.50)	168.8 (6.65)	162.1 (6.38)	147.3 (5.80)	1,417.1 (55.79)
Average relative humidity (%)	80	78	78	82	81	73	64	64	70	80	81	82	76
Mean monthly sunshine hours	145.7	118.6	127.1	111.0	124.0	147.0	173.6	167.4	147.0	127.1	141.0	148.8	1,678.3
Mean daily sunshine hours	4.7	4.2	4.1	3.7	4.0	4.9	5.6	5.4	4.9	4.1	4.7	4.8	4.6
Source: Instituto de Hidrologia Meteorologia y Estudios Ambientales
