= Lake Yaguarcocha (Cajamarca) =

Lake in Peru

Yaguarcocha
- Laguna Yahuarcocha
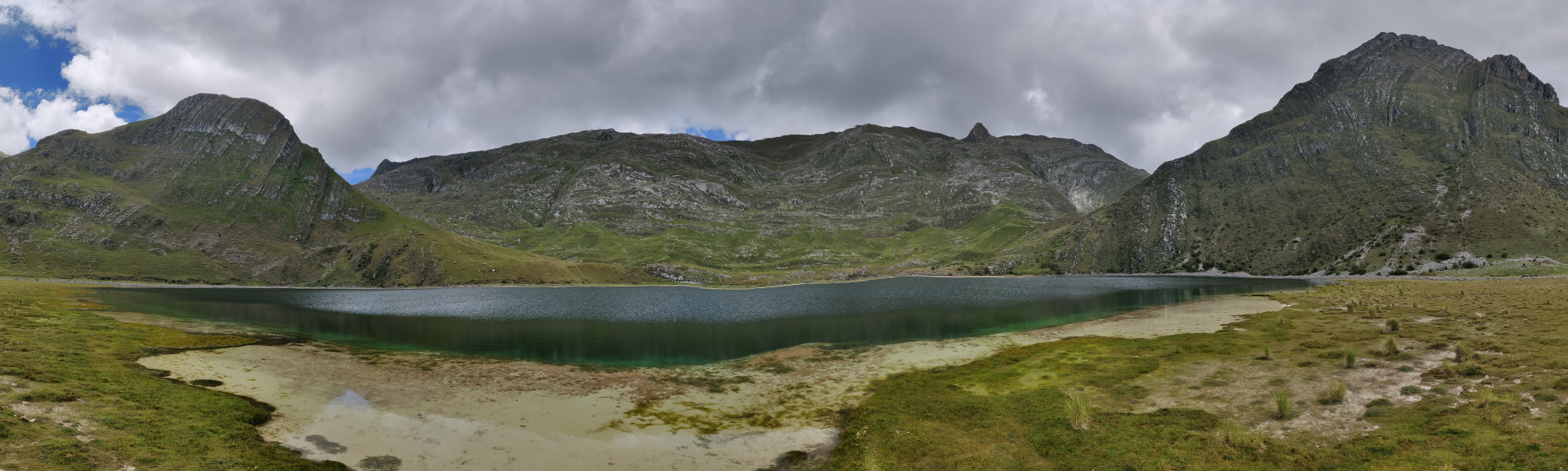
- Panoramic view Lake Yaguarcocha in Cajamarca

- Location within Peru Location within South America
- Location: Peru; Cajamarca Region
- Coordinates: 7°34′45″S 77°58′29″W
- Surface elevation: 3,600 metres (11,811 ft)

Yaguarcocha, Yahuarcocha or Yawarcocha (possibly from Quechua yawar blood qucha lake, "blood lake") is a lake in Peru located in the Cajamarca Region, Cajabamba Province, Sitacocha District. Yaguarcocha lies at a height of about 3,600 metres (11,811 ft), south of the little town Lluchubamba and northwest of the lake Quengococha, near the mountain Rima Rima.

== Gallery ==
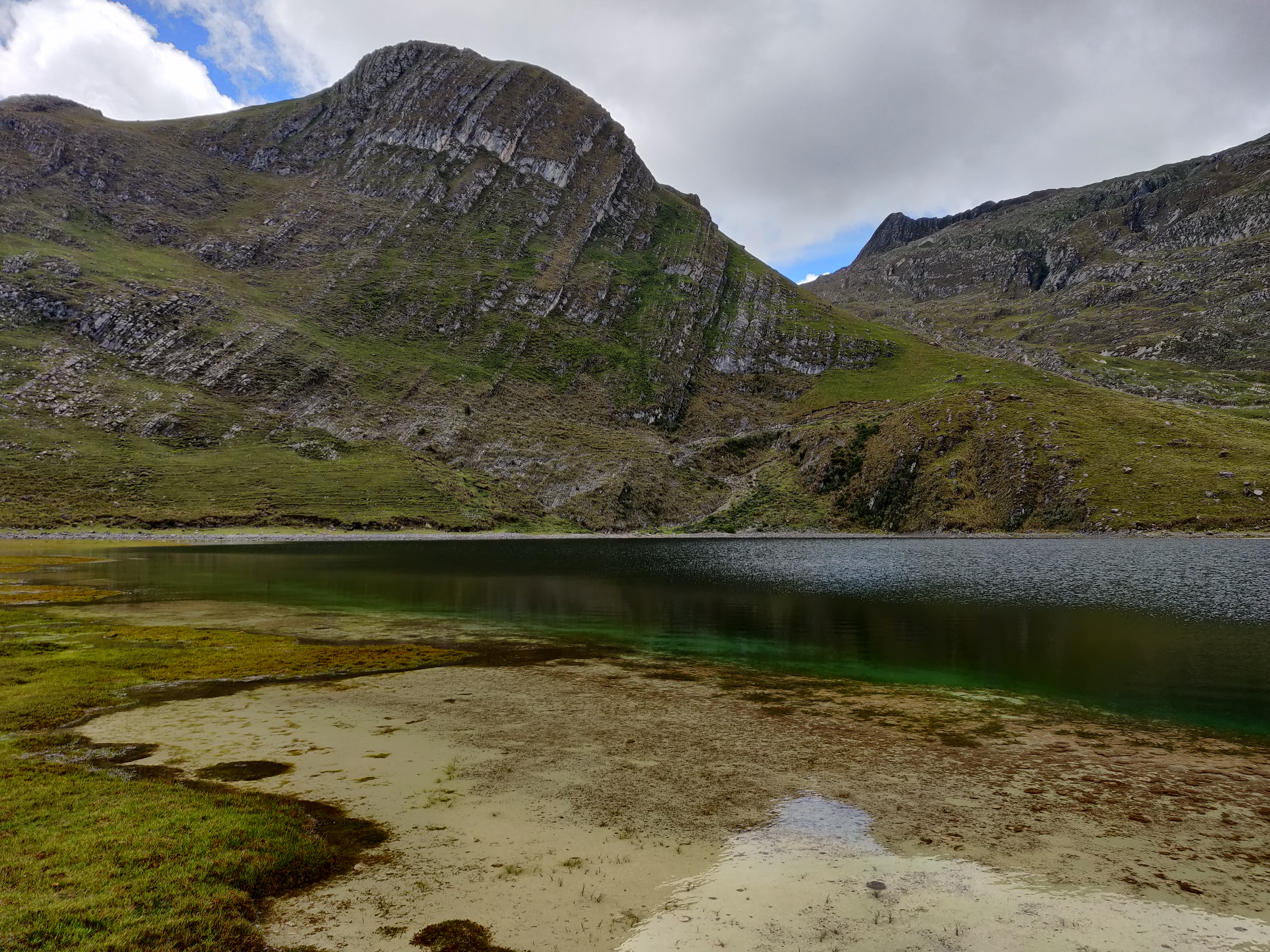
Lake Yaguarcocha in Cajamarca

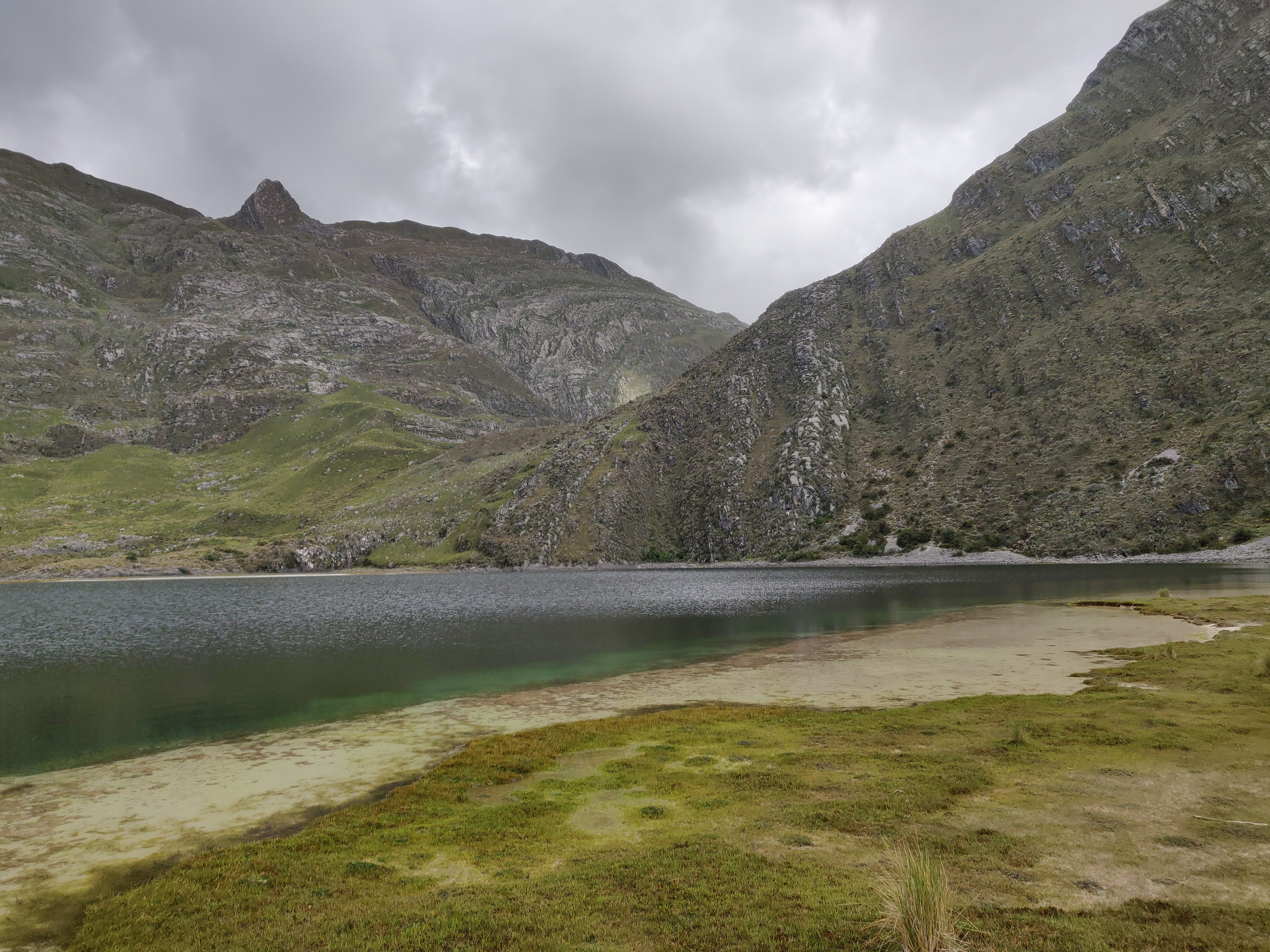
Lake Yaguarcocha in Cajamarca

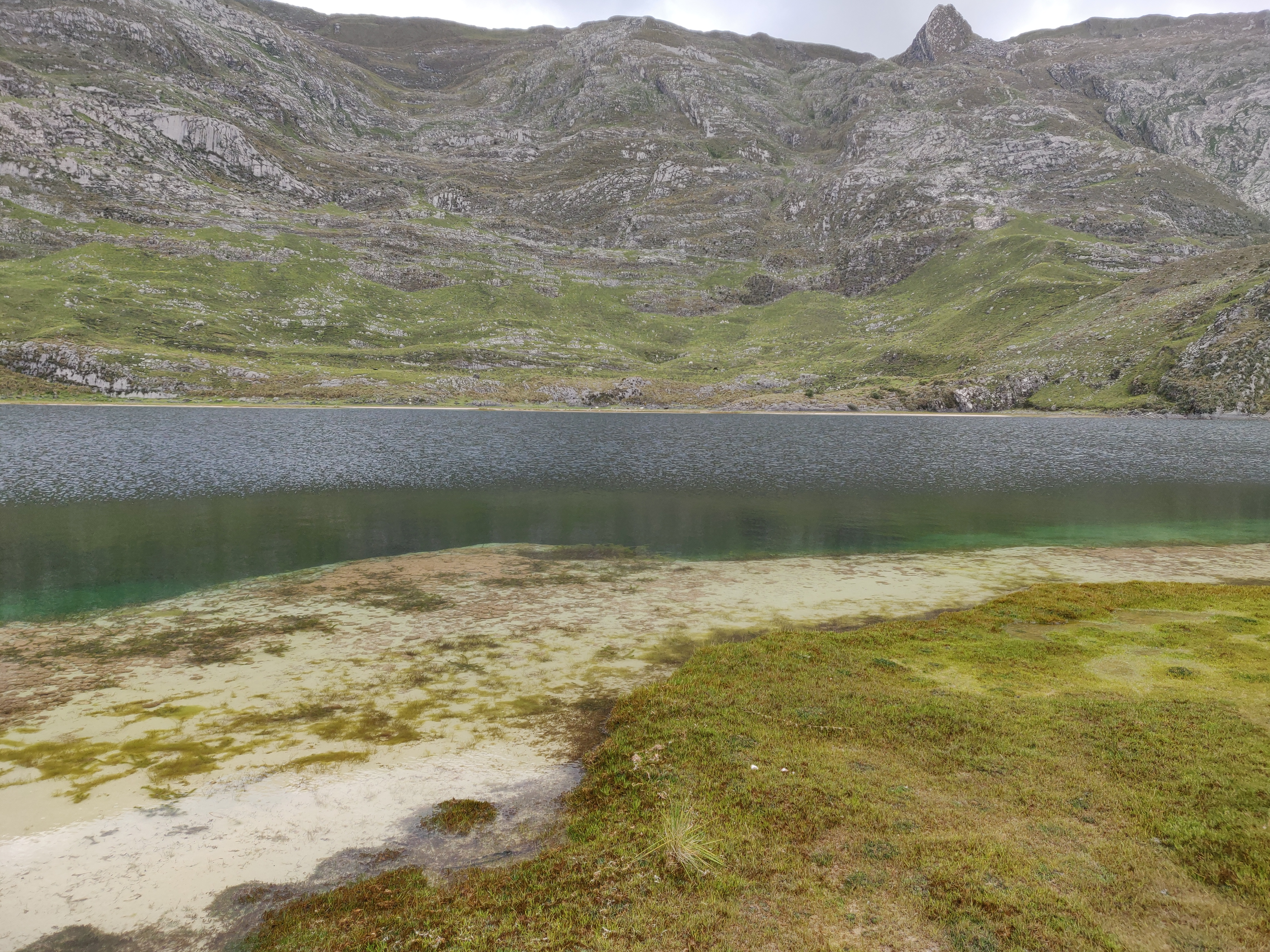
Lake Yaguarcocha in Cajamarca
