= Zaña River =

River in Peru

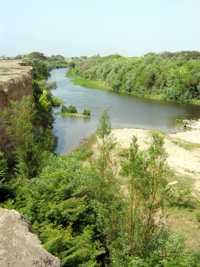
- The Zaña River near its mouth.

- Location of mouth

Location
- Peru: Lambayeque, Cajamarca regions

Physical characteristics
- Source
  - coordinates: 6.999°S 76.940°W
  - elevation: 3,750 metres (12,300 ft)
- Mouth
  - coordinates: 6.928°S 78.893°W
  - elevation: 0 m (0 ft)
- Length: 119 kilometres (74 miles)
- Basin size: 2,158 square kilometres (833 sq mi)
- Discharge
  - average: 202 million m3 (annual); 6.5 m3 per second average

The Zaña River (also Saña River) is a small river in northern Peru. The river is 119 kilometres (74 miles) in length and begins in the Andes of Cajamarca Region and ends at the Pacific Ocean in Lambayeque Region. In the lower part of the river valley, where the river flows through the coastal desert of Peru, the cultivation of irrigated crops is extensive and the Zaña is usually dry near its mouth. Upriver, at higher elevations in the Andes, precipitation is much greater and downstream floods are common. One such flood wiped out the important city of Zaña in 1720. Zaña has been rebuilt, but has never regained its former prominence as an urban center. Other towns in the lower valley are Mocupe, Cayalti, Nueva Arica, and Oyotun.

The most distant source of the Zaña River is at an elevation of 3,750 metres (12,300 ft) at coordinates 6.998° S latitude and 78.83° W longitude. The village of Udima is near the source of the river.

== Vegetation ==
The semi-tropical forests found at elevations above 2,000 metres (6,600 ft) in the upper parts of the Zaña basin are an unusual feature of the river. The existence of the forests is due to the relatively low elevations of the Andes in this region between the desert coasts of western Peru and the rainforests of the Amazon Basin of the east. Plant and animal species characteristic of the Amazon are found here on the western slopes of the Andes. The Peruvian government recognized the uniqueness of the forests in 2010 by creating the "Reserved Zone of Udima" consisting of 30,503 hectares (75,370 acres) of land overlooking the headwaters of the Zaña. From the lands in the reserved zone, the Bosques Nublados de Udima Wildlife Refuge (Cloud Forests of Udima Wildlife Refuge) with an area of 12,183 hectares (30,100 acres) was created in 2011.

== Archaeology ==
Numerous pre-Columbian ruins are scattered throughout the basin of the Zaña River. Near the Nanchoc river, a tributary of the Zaňa, archaeologist Tom Dillehay has found what may be the oldest irrigation canals in the Americas, radiocarbon dated to at least 3400 BCE and possibly as old as 4700 BCE. The canals built by the people of Nanchoc at that time were utilized to irrigate crops such as peanuts, squash, manioc, and chenopods, a relative of Quinoa.

In 2019, Peruvian archaeologist Walter Alva discovered the ruins of a megalithic temple in the Zaña Valley near Oyotun. The temple, apparently belonging to the Chavin culture (900 to 200 BCE), is 56 metres (184 ft) long and 40 metres (130 ft) wide and built of large stones which were dragged from a long distance to the temple site. The temple is believed by Alva to be part of a larger complex.

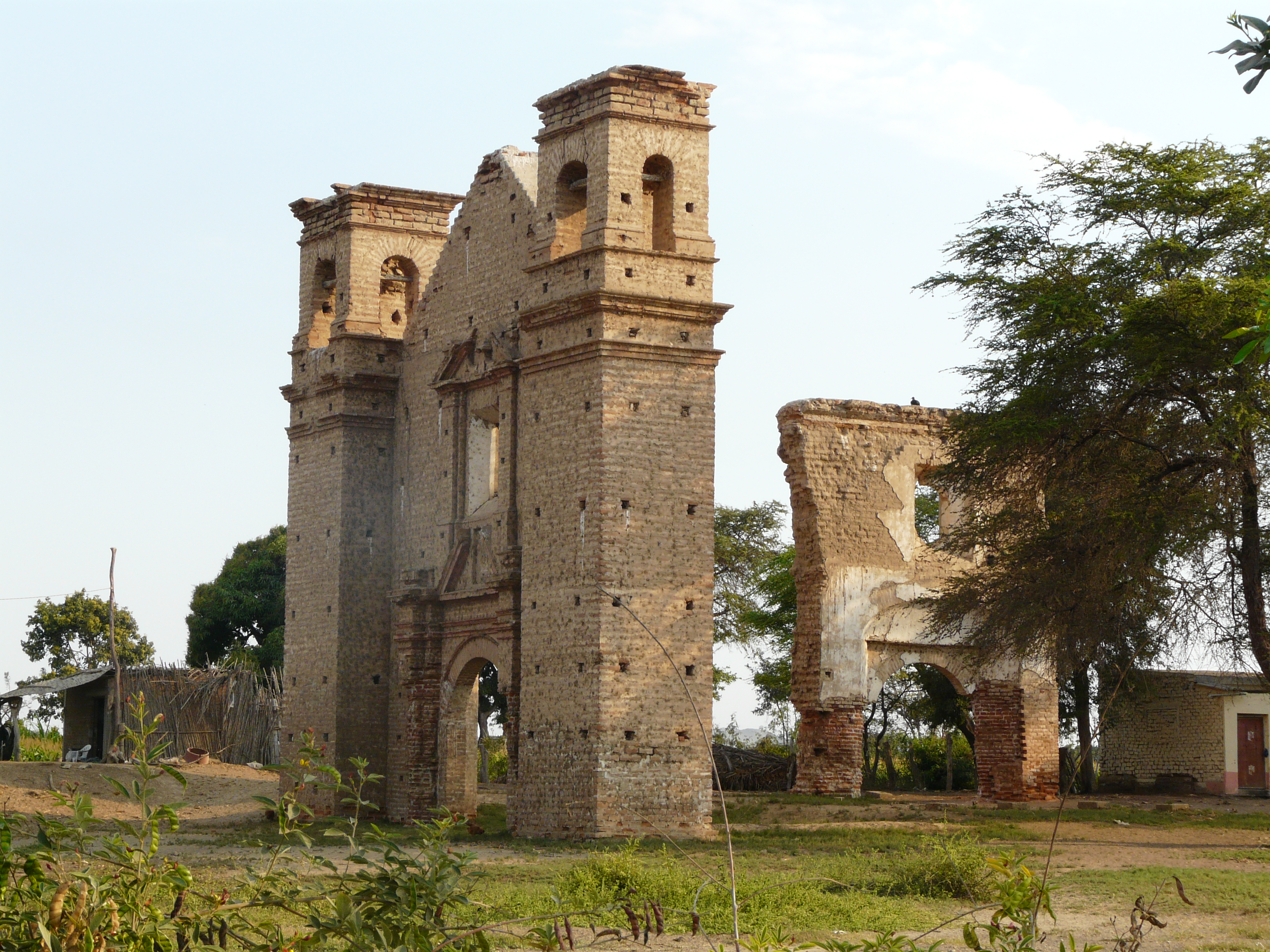
The ruins of Zaña, destroyed by a flood in 1720.
