= Cajabamba District =

Coordinates: 7.6229°S 78.0459°W

Cajabamba
- District
- Interactive map of Cajabamba
- Country: Peru
- Region: Cajamarca
- Province: Cajabamba
- Capital: Cajabamba

Government
  - Mayor: Carlos Alberto Urbina Burgos

Area
  - Total: 192.29 km^{2} (74.24 sq mi)
- Elevation: 2,654 m (8,707 ft)

Population (2005 census)
  - Total: 26,437
  - Density: 137.49/km^{2} (356.08/sq mi)
- Time zone: UTC-5 (PET)
- UBIGEO: 060201

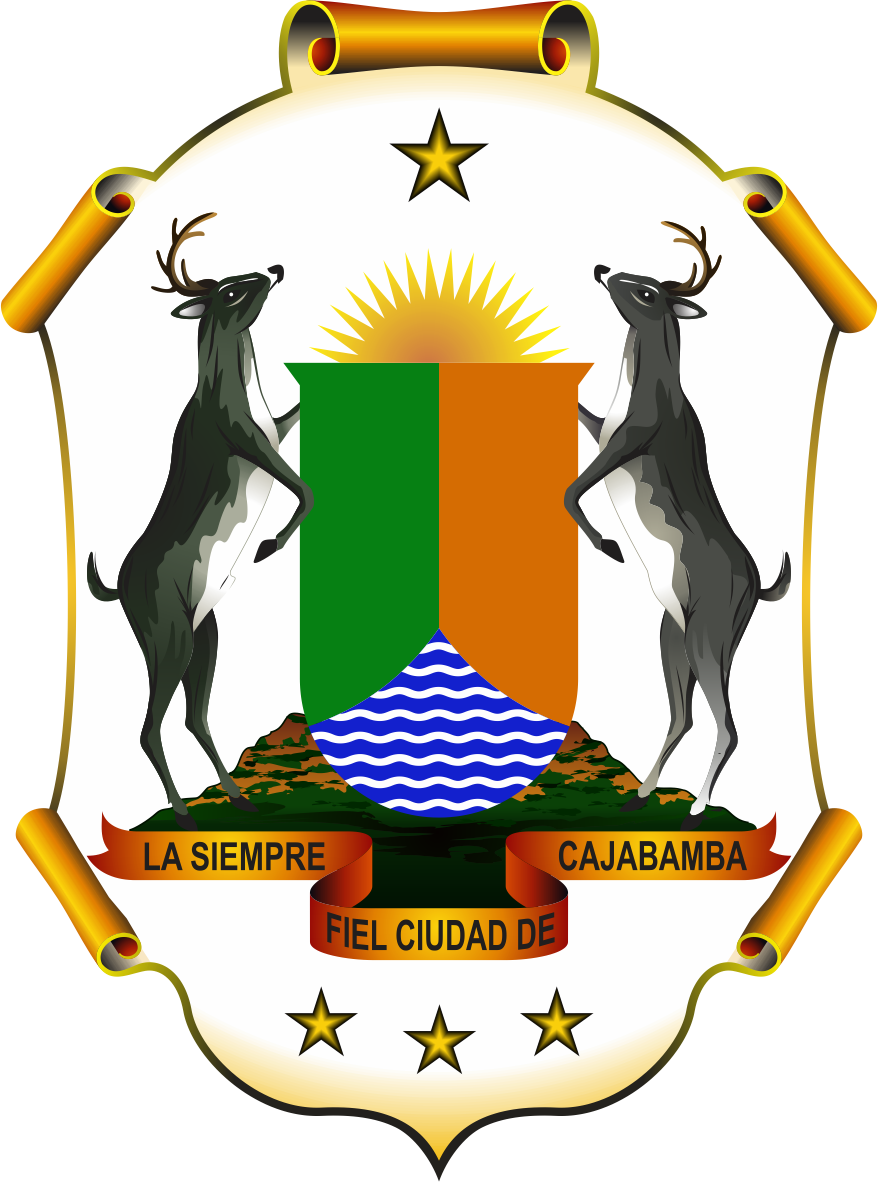
Seal of the Cajabamba District

Cajabamba District is one of the four districts of the province Cajabamba in Peru.

== See also ==
- Q'inququcha
