= Cajabamba, Peru =

Cajabamba, Peru Kashapampa
- Town
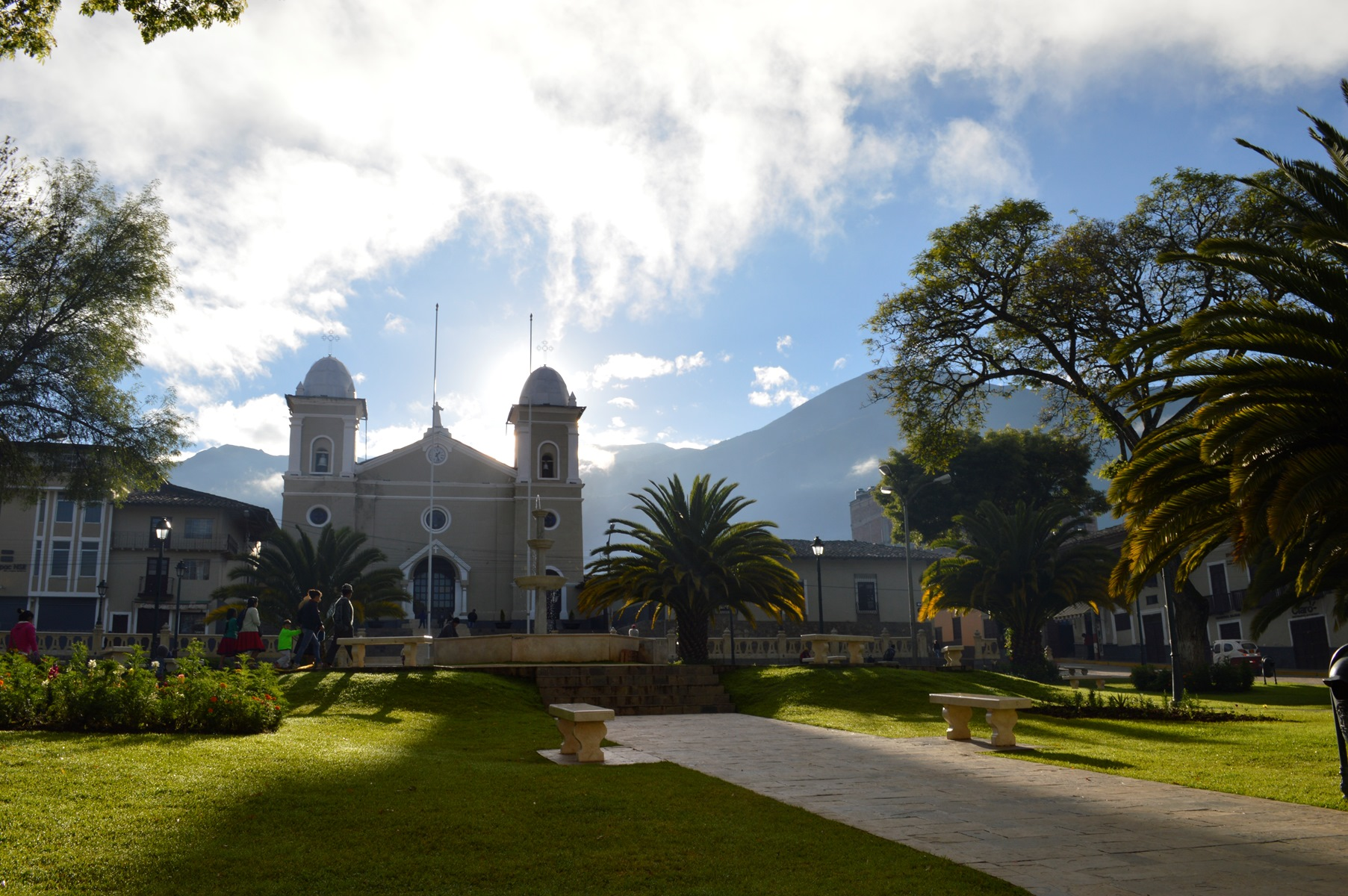

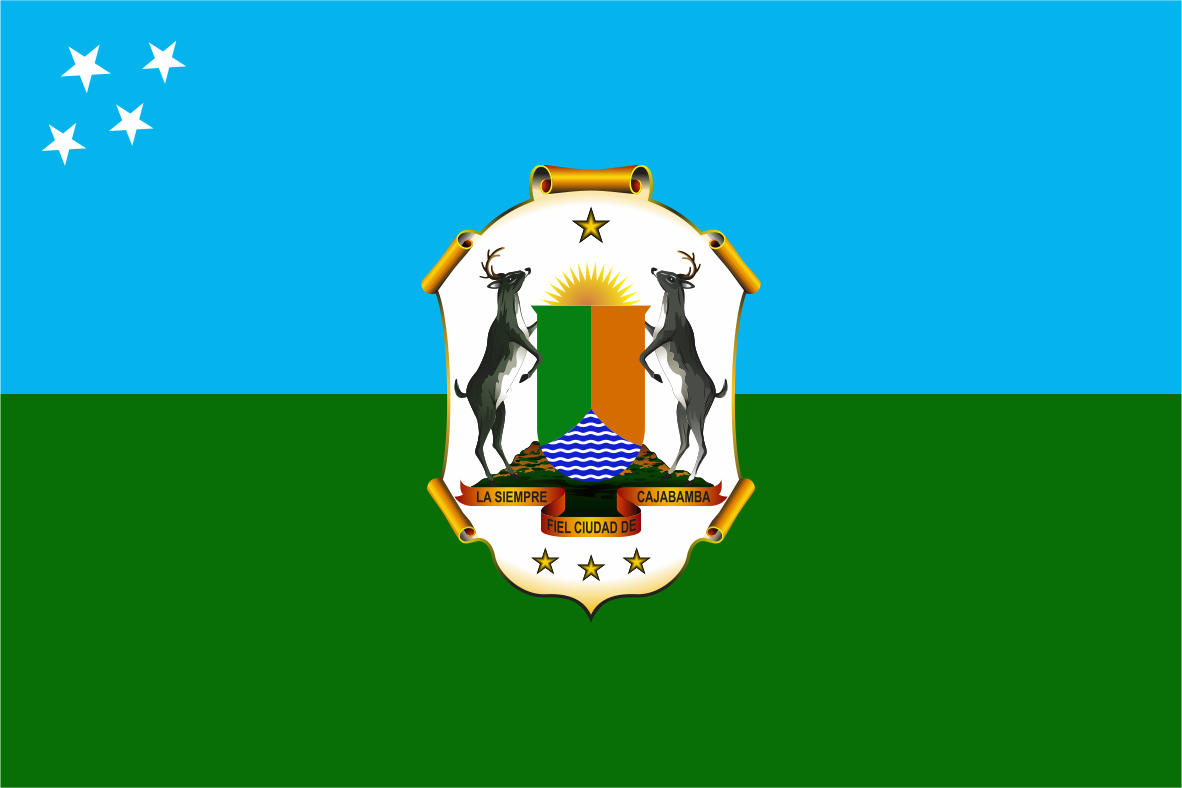
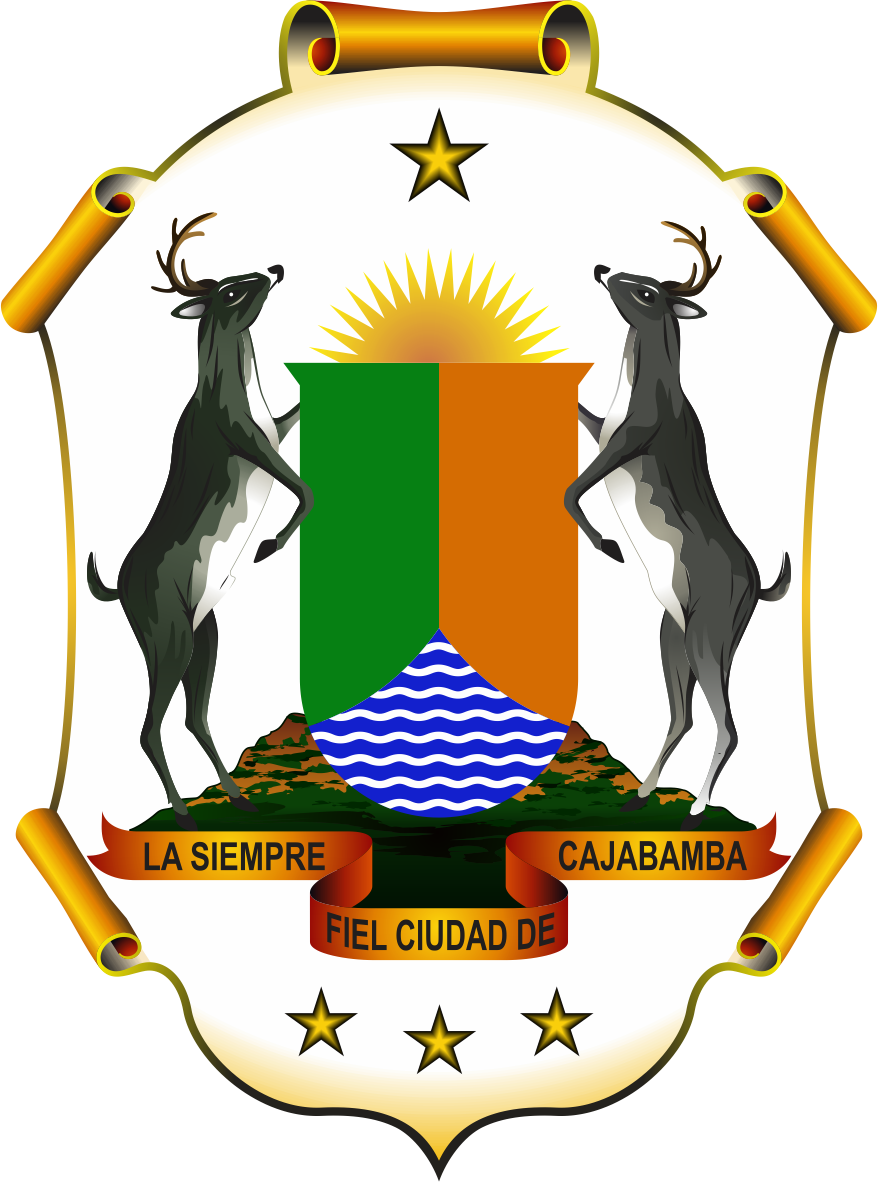
- Flag Seal

- Location within Peru
- Coordinates: 7°37′25.40″S 78°02′45.71″W
- Country: Peru
- Region: Cajamarca
- Province: Cajabamba
- District: Cajabamba

Government
  - Mayor: Carlos Alberto Urbina Burgos
- Elevation: 2,654 m (8,707 ft)
- Time zone: UTC-5 (PET)

Cajabamba is a town in Northern Peru and is the capital of the province of Cajabamba, in the region of Cajamarca.

On the 19th of March, 1888, painter José Sabogal was born in Cajabamba. The José Sabogal Dieguez Quick Painting Contest is held annually in Cajabamba.

The Day of the Virgin of the Rosary, or the Virgen de Rosario Festival, has been held annually in Cajabamba since 1668. The festival start with a mass on the first Sunday of October, and the 10-day celebration includes fireworks, local arts, and traditional dances.

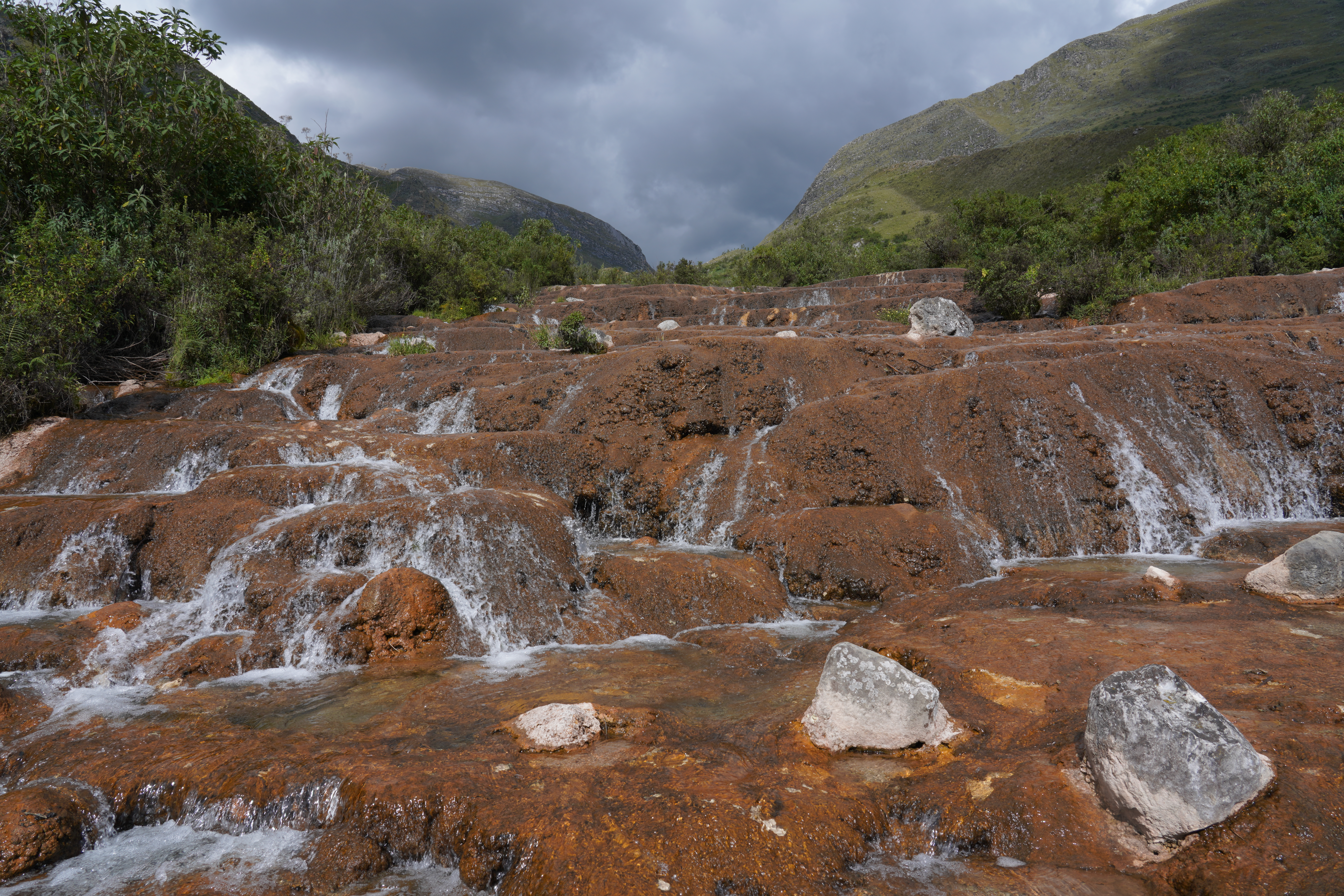
Las cascadas de cochecorral

The province of Cajabamba was founded by the friars of the Order of Hermits of the Great Father Saint Augustine, who, having been sent from Spain by King Charles V with the permission of Pope Paul III, arrived in this region in 1533. The "Three Juans," a trio of friars named Juan de San Pedro, Juan del Canto, and Juan Ramirez settled on the right bank of the Los Ojos de Lanla spring. As part of their mission to colonize the area, the friars reorganized the Huarangas, small groups of scattered people who gathered for work. With the reorginization of the Huarangas, they founded the town of San Nicolás de Tolentino de Cajabamba and built a mission chapel where the Santa Ana General Cemetery currently stands. In 1837, José de la Mar gave Cajabamba the title of Villa. Two years later, Agustín Gamarra granted it the title Always faithful city of Cajabamba. On January 2, 1850, the region was elevated to the status of province. In 1861, the construction of the current Main Church was completed.

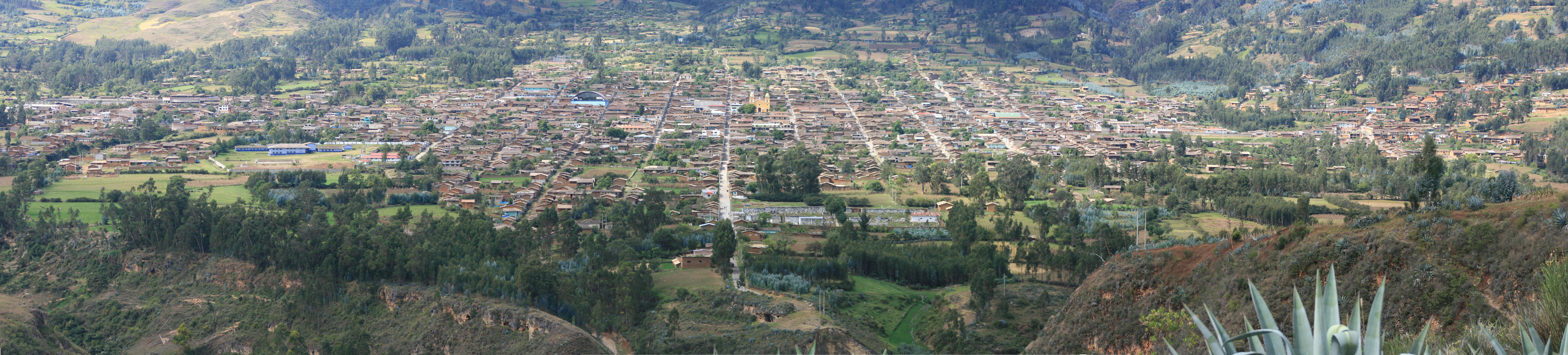
Panoramic photo of Cajabamba

== Climate ==
Cajabamba has a subtropical highland climate (Köppen: Cwb) with consistently mild temperatures. Cajabamba has a dry season from June to August.

Climate data for Cajabamba (1991–2020)
Month	Jan	Feb	Mar	Apr	May	Jun	Jul	Aug	Sep	Oct	Nov	Dec	Year
Mean daily maximum °C (°F)	22.7 (72.9)	22.1 (71.8)	21.6 (70.9)	22.1 (71.8)	22.9 (73.2)	22.9 (73.2)	23.0 (73.4)	23.7 (74.7)	23.9 (75.0)	23.5 (74.3)	23.3 (73.9)	22.7 (72.9)	22.9 (73.2)
Mean daily minimum °C (°F)	11.2 (52.2)	11.4 (52.5)	11.4 (52.5)	11.0 (51.8)	10.3 (50.5)	9.1 (48.4)	8.4 (47.1)	8.8 (47.8)	10.1 (50.2)	10.8 (51.4)	10.5 (50.9)	11.1 (52.0)	10.3 (50.5)
Average precipitation mm (inches)	121.4 (4.78)	148.9 (5.86)	176.1 (6.93)	103.8 (4.09)	43.4 (1.71)	9.2 (0.36)	8.3 (0.33)	7.7 (0.30)	37.8 (1.49)	96.0 (3.78)	96.8 (3.81)	142.4 (5.61)	991.8 (39.05)
Source: NOAA
