= Cajabamba province =

Coordinates: 7.623743°S 78.047896°W

Cajabamba
- Province
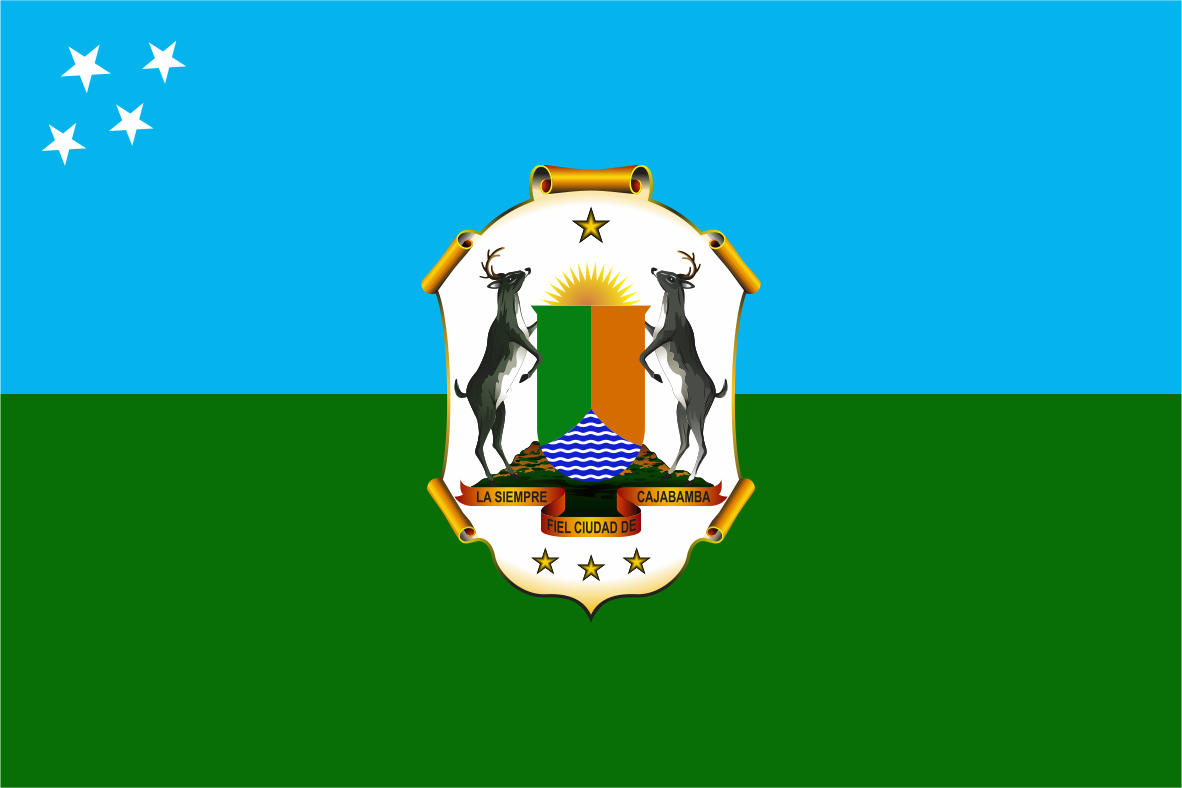
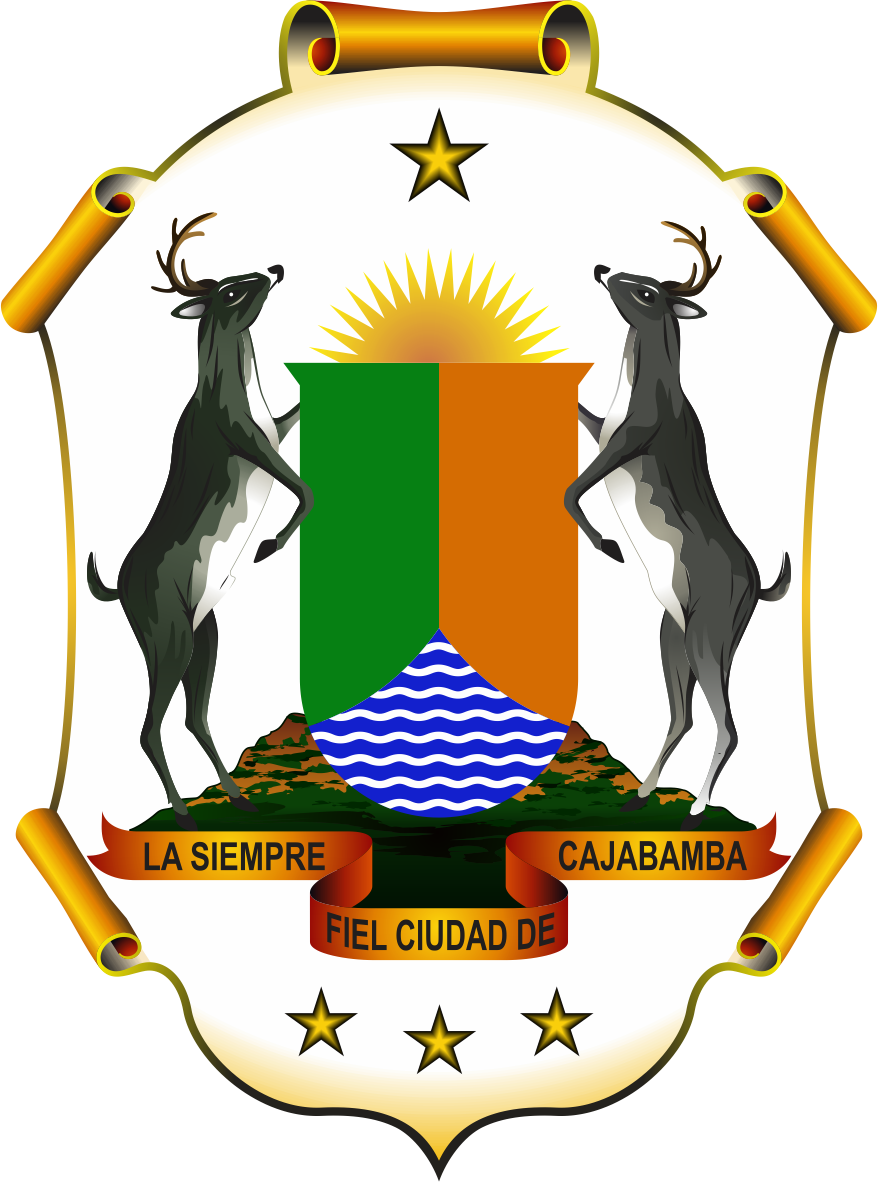
- Flag Coat of arms

- Location of Cajabamba in the Cajamarca Region
- Country: Peru
- Region: Cajamarca
- Founded: January 2, 1850
- Capital: Cajabamba

Government
  - Mayor: Carlos Alberto Urbina Burgos

Area
  - Total: 1,807.64 km^{2} (697.93 sq mi)
- Elevation: 2,654 m (8,707 ft)

Population
  - Total: 74,988
  - Density: 41.484/km^{2} (107.44/sq mi)
- UBIGEO: 0602
- Website: www.municajabamba.gob.pe

Cajabamba is a province of the Cajamarca Region in Peru. The capital of the province is Cajabamba.

== Political division ==
The province measures 1,807.64 square kilometres (697.93 sq mi) and is divided into four districts:

| District | Mayor | Capital |
|---|---|---|
| Cachachi | Enrique Felipe Gamboa Rojas | Cachachi |
| Cajabamba | Carlos Alberto Urbina Burgos | Cajabamba |
| Codebamba | José Marcelo Gamboa Hilario | Cauday |
| Sitacocha | German Valladares Guerra | Lluchubamba |

== See also ==
- Q'inququcha
- Yawarqucha
