= Santa Cruz =

Santa Cruz (Spanish or Portuguese, 'holy cross') or Santacruz may refer to:

== Places ==
=== Africa ===
- Fort of Santa Cruz (Oran), a fort in Oran port city in Algeria
- Santa Cruz, Cape Verde, a municipality on the eastern part of the island of Santiago
- Santa Cruz do Cabo de Gué, the 16th-century name of Agadir, Morocco
- Santa Cruz (Santiago), a town on the island of Santiago, Cape Verde
- Santa Cruz, São Tomé and Príncipe, on São Tomé Island

=== Asia and Oceania ===
==== India ====
- RAF Santa Cruz, a former Royal Air Force airfield, Mumbai
- Santacruz, Mumbai, Maharashtra
- Santacruz Airport, the domestic terminal of Chhatrapati Shivaji Maharaj International Airport
- Santacruz metro station, Mumbai
- Santacruz railway station, railway station on the Mumbai suburban railway
- Santa Cruz, Goa, a suburb of the state capital of Panjim

==== Other places in Asia and Oceania ====
- Santa Cruz Islands, Solomon Islands in the Pacific Ocean
- Santa Cruz, Camarines Norte (disambiguation)
  - Santa Cruz, a barangay in Jose Panganiban
  - Santa Cruz, a barangay in Labo
  - Santa Cruz, a barangay in Talisay
- Santa Cruz, Davao del Sur, a municipality in Metropolitan Davao
- Santa Cruz, Ilocos Sur, a municipality in the province of Ilocos Sur
- Santa Cruz, Laguna, a municipality and the capital of Laguna
- Santa Cruz, Manila, a district in the north part of the city
- Santa Cruz, Marinduque, a municipality in the province of Marinduque
- Santa Cruz, Occidental Mindoro, a municipality in the province of Occidental Mindoro
- Santa Cruz, Quezon City, a village in the San Francisco Del Monte district of Quezon City
- Santa Cruz, San Jose, Camarines Sur, a barangay
- Santa Cruz, San Jose, Dinagat Islands, a barangay
- Santa Cruz, Tubajon, Dinagat Islands, a barangay
- Santa Cruz, Zambales, a municipality in the province of Zambales
- Santa Cruz, a barangay in the municipality of Anda, Bohol
- Santa Cruz, a barangay in the municipality of Cagayancillo, Palawan
- Santa Cruz, a barangay in Cebu City
- Santa Cruz, a barangay in Pasig
- Santa Cruz Poblacion, a barangay in Calabanga, Camarines Sur
- Santa Cruz River (Philippines), a river system in Santa Cruz, Laguna, on the island of Luzon

=== Europe ===
==== Portugal ====
===== Azores =====
- Santa Cruz (Lagoa), civil parish in the municipality of Lagoa
- Santa Cruz das Flores, municipality on the island of Flores
  - Santa Cruz das Flores (parish), civil parish in the municipality of Santa Cruz das Flores
- Santa Cruz da Graciosa, municipality on the island of Graciosa
  - Santa Cruz da Graciosa (parish), civil parish in the municipality of Santa Cruz da Graciosa

===== Other places in Portugal =====
- Santa Cruz (Almodôvar), civil parish in the municipality of Almodôvar
- Santa Cruz (Coimbra), civil parish in the municipality of Coimbra
- Santa Cruz, Madeira, municipality on the island of Madeira
- Santa Cruz (Praia da Vitória), a civil parish on Terceira Island, Azores
- Santa Cruz (Armamar), civil parish in Armamar
- Santa Cruz (Santiago do Cacém), former civil parish in Santiago do Cacém
- Santa Cruz (Torres Vedras), village and beach resort in the parish of Silveira
- Santa Cruz (Vinhais), civil parish in the municipality of Vinhais

==== Spain ====
===== Municipalities =====
- Santa Cruz de Bezana, municipality in Cantabria
- Santa Cruz de Boedo, municipality in Palencia
- Santa Cruz de Grío, municipality in Zaragoza
- Santa Cruz de Moncayo, municipality in Zaragoza
- Santa Cruz de Mudela, municipality in Ciudad Real
- Santa Cruz de Nogueras, municipality in Teruel
- Santa Cruz de la Salceda, municipality in Burgos
- Santa Cruz de la Serós, municipality in Huesca
- Santa Cruz de los Cáñamos, municipality in Ciudad Real
- Santa Cruz de La Palma, municipality in the province of Santa Cruz de Tenerife in the Canary Islands
- Santa Cruz de Tenerife, capital of the province of Santa Cruz de Tenerife and joint capital of the Canary Islands

===== Other places in Spain =====
- Province of Santa Cruz de Tenerife, containing the islands of Tenerife, La Gomera, El Hierro, and La Palma
- Santa Cruz, an urban area in Oleiros, Galicia
- Santa Cruz (Mieres), a parish in Mieres, Asturias
- Santa Cruz, Seville, city district
- Castillo de Santa Cruz, castle on the Isla de Santa Cruz in A Coruña, Galicia
- Santa Cruz del Valle de los Caídos, basilica and monument in the Sierra de Guadarrama, near Madrid

=== North and Central America ===
==== Belize ====
- Santa Cruz, Orange Walk, a municipality in Belize
- Santa Cruz, Stann Creek, municipality
- Santa Cruz, Toledo, village in Toledo District

==== Canada ====
- Santa Cruz, Ontario, an underwater ghost town

==== Cuba ====
- Santa Cruz del Norte, town and municipality in the Mayabeque Province
- Santa Cruz del Sur, town and municipality in the Camagüey Province

==== Dominican Republic ====
- Santa Cruz de Barahona, city in the Barahona Province
- Santa Cruz de El Seibo, city in the El Seibo Province
- Santa Cruz de Mao, municipality in the Valverde province

==== Dutch Caribbean ====
- Santa Cruz, Aruba, town in central Aruba
- Playa Santa Cruz, beach on the Caribbean island of Curaçao

==== Mexico ====
===== State of Oaxaca =====
- Santa Cruz Acatepec, town and municipality
- Santa Cruz Amilpas, town and municipality
- Santa Cruz de Bravo, town and municipality
- Santa Cruz Itundujia, town and municipality
- Santa Cruz Mixtepec, town and municipality
- Santa Cruz Nundaco, town and municipality
- Santa Cruz Papalutla, town and municipality
- Santa Cruz Tacache de Mina, town and municipality
- Santa Cruz Tacahua, town and municipality
- Santa Cruz Tayata, town and municipality
- Santa Cruz Xitla, town and municipality
- Santa Cruz Xoxocotlán, town and municipality
- Santa Cruz Zenzontepec, town and municipality

===== Other Mexican states =====
- Santa Cruz Atizapán, town and municipality in Mexico State
- Santa Cruz de Juventino Rosas, city and municipality in Guanajuato
- Santa Cruz del Rincón, municipality in Guerrero
- Santa Cruz Municipality, Sonora
  - Santa Cruz, Sonora, town in Santa Cruz Municipality

==== Nicaragua ====
- Santa Cruz, Rivas, village on the island of Ometepe in Lake Nicaragua
- Santa Cruz, Rio San Juan, village in El Castillo, Nicaragua

==== Panama ====
- Santa Cruz, Renacimiento, corregimiento in Renacimiento District, Chiriquí Province
- Santa Cruz, San Félix, corregimiento in San Félix District, Chiriquí Province

==== Puerto Rico ====
- Santa Cruz, Carolina, Puerto Rico, a barrio

==== United States ====
- Santa Cruz, Arizona, a census-designated place (CDP) in Pinal County
- Santa Cruz, Pima County, Arizona, a populated place situated in Pima County
- Santa Cruz County, Arizona
- Santa Cruz River (Arizona), river in southern Arizona and northern Sonora, Mexico
- Santa Cruz County, California
- Santa Cruz, California, county seat and city in Santa Cruz County
- Santa Cruz Island, Santa Barbara County, California
- Santa Cruz (Mariposa County), the former name of Indian Gulch, California
- Santa Cruz, New Mexico
- Santa Cruz, Texas, a former census-designated place in Starr County
- Santa Cruz, Starr County, Texas, a census-designated place in Starr County
- Santa Cruz, the Spanish name for Saint Croix, US Virgin Islands

==== Other places in North and Central America ====
- Santa Cruz (canton), Costa Rica, in Guanacaste Province, Costa Rica
- Santa Cruz del Quiché, city in Guatemala
- Santa Cruz, Lempira, a municipality in the department of Lempira, Honduras
- Santa Cruz de Yojoa, municipality in Honduras
- Santa Cruz, Jamaica, town in St. Elizabeth Parish, Jamaica
- Santa Cruz, Trinidad and Tobago, town in the Santa Cruz Valley, Trinidad and Tobago

=== South America ===
==== Argentina ====
- Santa Cruz Province, Argentina, in Patagonia
  - Puerto Santa Cruz, town and municipality in Santa Cruz province
- Santa Cruz, Catamarca, village and municipality
- Santa Cruz, La Rioja, village and municipality
- Santa Cruz River (Argentina), in Santa Cruz province

==== Bolivia ====
- Santa Cruz Department (Bolivia)
  - Santa Cruz de la Sierra, capital city of Santa Cruz Department

==== Other places in South America ====
- Santa Cruz, Chile, city and commune in the O'Higgins Region
- Santa Cruz, Aragua, city and part of the metropolitan area of Maracay, Venezuela
- Santa Cruz, Paraíba
- Santa Cruz, Rio Grande do Norte
- Santa Cruz do Arari, Pará
- Santa Cruz Cabrália, Bahia
- Santa Cruz da Conceição, São Paulo
- Santa Cruz do Escalvado, Minas Gerais
- Santa Cruz da Esperança, São Paulo
- Santa Cruz de Goiás
- Santa Cruz dos Milagres, Piauí
- Santa Cruz de Minas, Minas Gerais
- Santa Cruz das Palmeiras, São Paulo
- Santa Cruz do Piauí, Piauí
- Santa Cruz do Rio Pardo, São Paulo
- Santa Cruz de Salinas, Minas Gerais
- Santa Cruz da Vitória, Bahia

===== Cities =====
- Santa Cruz, Pernambuco, city in the state of Pernambuco
- Santa Cruz da Baixa Verde, city in the state of Pernambuco
- Santa Cruz do Capibaribe, city in the state of Pernambuco
- Santa Cruz do Sul, city in Rio Grande do Sul

===== Other places in Brazil =====
- Santa Cruz, Rio de Janeiro, neighborhood in Rio de Janeiro
- Santa Cruz (São Paulo Metro), metro station in the Vila Mariana district of São Paulo

==== Colombia ====
- Santa Cruz de Lorica, town and municipality in the department of Cordoba
- Santa Cruz de Mompox, town and municipality in the Bolívar Department
- Santa Cruz del Islote, island in the Caribbean Sea, part of the Archipelago of San Bernardo
- Santacruz, Nariño, town and municipality
- Santa Cruz (Medellín), commune in the city of Medellín

==== Ecuador ====
- Santa Cruz Canton, Ecuador, canton in the province of Galápagos
- Santa Cruz Island (Galápagos), one of the Galápagos Islands

==== Peru ====
- Santa Cruz (mountain), mountain in the Cordillera Blanca
- Santa Cruz District, Alto Amazonas, district of Alto Amazonas Province
- Santa Cruz District, Ancash, district of Huaylas Province
- Santa Cruz de Andamarca District, district of Huaral Province
- Santa Cruz de Chuca District, district of Santiago de Chuco Province
- Santa Cruz de Cocachacra District, district of Huarochirí Province
- Santa Cruz de Flores District, district of Cañete Province
- Santa Cruz District, Palpa, district of Palpa Province
- Santa Cruz District, Santa Cruz, district and capital of Santa Cruz Province
- Santa Cruz de Toledo District, district of Contumazá Province
- Santa Cruz, Satipo, Peru, a settlement founded by Franciscans in 1673
- Santa Cruz Province, Peru, province in the Cajamarca Region

== People ==
- Santa Cruz (surname), list of notable people bearing this name

== Business ==
- Santa Cruz Beach Boardwalk, oceanfront amusement park, Santa Cruz, California
- Santa Cruz Bicycles, American bicycle manufacturer
- Santa Cruz Games, video game company
- Santa Cruz Guitar Company, American manufacturer of acoustic guitars, Santa Cruz, California
- Santa Cruz Operation, software company
- Santa Cruz Skateboards, American brand of skateboards manufactured by NHS, Inc.
- Santa Cruz, sound card manufactured by Turtle Beach Systems
- TV Santa Cruz, a television station in Itabuna, Bahia, Brazil

== Military ==
- Battle of Santa Cruz (disambiguation), list of notable battles bearing this name
- Battle of the Santa Cruz Islands, late−October, 1942
- Fort of Santa Cruz (Horta), fort in the Azores
- Fort of Santa Cruz (Oran), fort in Algeria

== Music ==
- Santa Cruz (band), a 2007–2024 Finnish hard rock band
- Santa Cruz (album), a 2024 album by Pedro the Lion
- "Santa Cruz (You're Not That Far)", a 2002 song by the Thrills

== Sports ==
=== Football (soccer) ===
==== Brazil ====
- Associação Atlética Santa Cruz, a club in Salinópolis
- Futebol Clube Santa Cruz, a club in Santa Cruz do Sol
- Santa Cruz Esporte Clube (MT), a club in Barra do Bugres
- Santa Cruz Futebol Clube, a club in Recife
- Santa Cruz Futebol Clube (MG), a club in Belo Horizonte
- Santa Cruz Futebol Clube (RJ), a club in Rio de Janeiro
- Santa Cruz Futebol Clube (RN), a club in Natal
- Santa Cruz Recreativo Esporte Clube, a club in Santa Rita
- Sport Club Santa Cruz, a club in Santa Cruz, Rio Grande do Norte

==== Chile ====
- Deportes Santa Cruz, a club in Santa Cruz

==== Bolivia ====
- Real Santa Cruz, a club in Santa Cruz de la Sierra
- Club Blooming Santa Cruz, a club in Santa Cruz de la Sierra

=== Other sports ===
- Santa Cruz Syndicate, a professional mountain bike racing team
- Santa Cruz Warriors, a basketball team
- UC Santa Cruz Banana Slugs, sports teams of the University of California, Santa Cruz

== Other uses ==
- Santa Cruz (Martian crater)
- Santa Cruz Cartel, Bolivian drug cartel
- Santa Cruz II, cruise ship of Ecuador
- Santa Cruz massacre, 1991 massacre in Timor-Leste (formerly Indonesia)
- Hyundai Santa Cruz, pickup truck introduced in 2021
- Santa Cruz (game), a 1976 board war game

== See also ==
- Canal de Santa Cruz, a salt water channel in the state of Pernambuco that separates the island of Itamaracá from the South American continent
- Cruz, a surname
- Cruz (disambiguation)
- Holy Cross (disambiguation) (English equivalent)
- Sainte-Croix (disambiguation) (French equivalent)
- Santa Croce (disambiguation) (Italian equivalent)
- Santa Cruise, a cruise ship previously named MS Annie Johnson
- Santa Cruz Canton (disambiguation)
- Santa Cruz District (disambiguation)
- Santa Cruz Formation (disambiguation)
- Santa Cruz Mountains, California
- Santa Cruz Province (disambiguation)
- St Cross (disambiguation)
- University of California, Santa Cruz, public research university
