= Santa Cruz District =

Santa Cruz District may refer to:

- Peru:
  - Santa Cruz District, Alto Amazonas, in Alto Amazonas province, Loreto region
  - Santa Cruz District, Cutervo, in Cutervo province, Cajamarca region
  - Santa Cruz District, Huaylas, in Huaylas province, Ancash region
  - Santa Cruz District, Palpa, in Palpa province, Ica region
  - Santa Cruz District, Santa Cruz, in Santa Cruz province, Cajamarca region
  - Santa Cruz de Andamarca District, in Huaral province, Lima region
  - Santa Cruz de Chuca District, in Santiago de Chuco province, La Libertad region
  - Santa Cruz de Cocachacra District, in Huarochirí province, Lima region
  - Santa Cruz de Flores District, in Cañete province, Lima region
  - Santa Cruz de Toledo District, in Contumazá province, Cajamarca region
- Costa Rica:
  - Santa Cruz District, León Cortés Castro, in León Cortés canton, San José province
  - Santa Cruz District, Santa Cruz, Guanacaste, in Santa Cruz canton, Guanacaste province
  - Santa Cruz District, Turrialba, in Turrialba canton, Cartago province

== See also ==
- Santa Cruz (disambiguation)
