= Basilica del Carmine, Padua =

Church building in Padua, Italy

Coordinates: 45.41°N 11.87°E

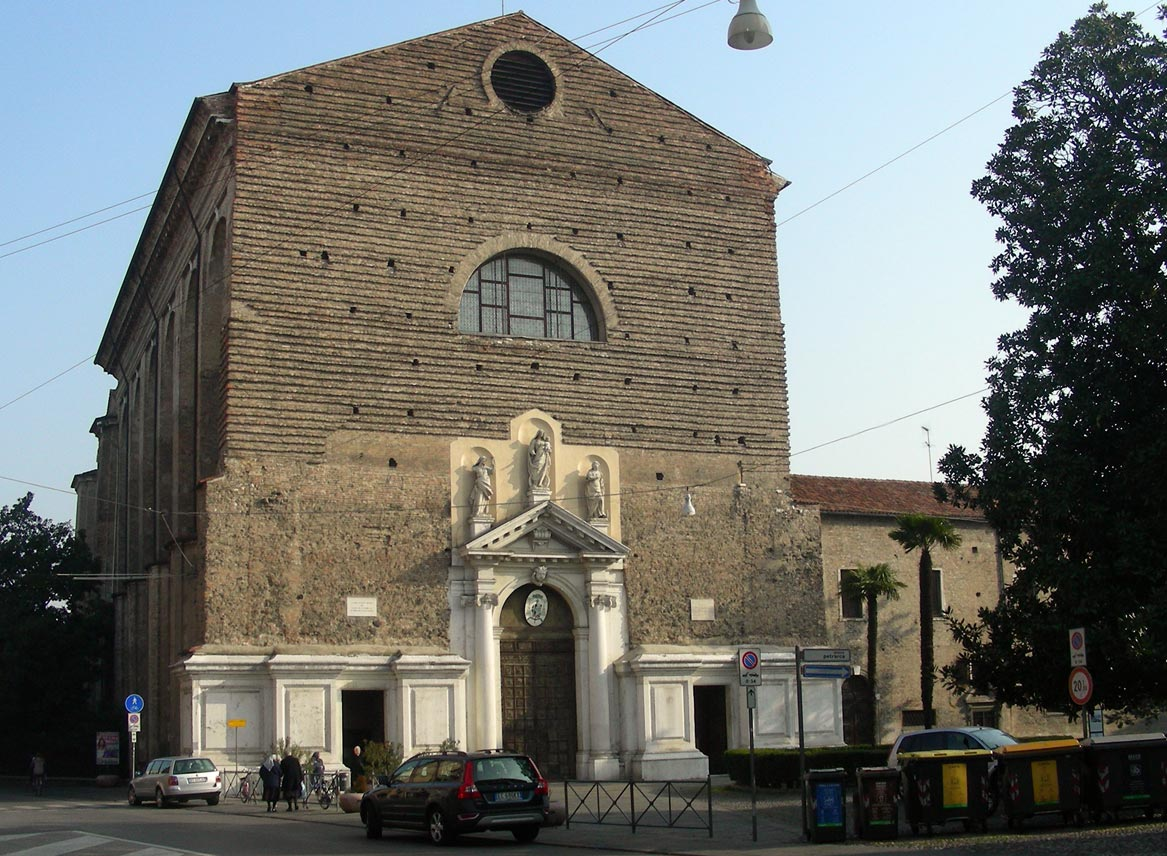
Facade of church

The Basilica del Carmine is a 16th-century Roman Catholic church located on piazza Francesco Petrarca in Padua, region of Veneto, Italy. It was made a minor basilica in 1960 by pope John XXIII

== History ==
The church and an attached monastery were founded by an order of Carmelite monks, hence the name. The order became established in Padua by the late 13th-century, and we have the first documentation of a church at the site by 1212. The adjacent monastery was refurbished in 1295, and the church was rebuilt in 1335 under the design of Lorenzo da Bologna. It was consecrated as Santa Maria del Carmine in 1446. In 1491, an earthquake nearly razed the building, requiring reconstruction in 1494. The bare brick facade only gained partial marble facing in the 18th-century; formerly, the facade had an open loggia. The church structure suffered various damaging events over the centuries, including another earthquake collapsing the roof in 1696; a fire during festivities burned the cupola in 1800; and two aerial bombardments hit the church, in 1917 and 1944.

Among the former parishioners of this church was the beatified Elisabetta Vendramini, who founded the order of Elisabethan sisters.

== Description ==
=== Exterior ===
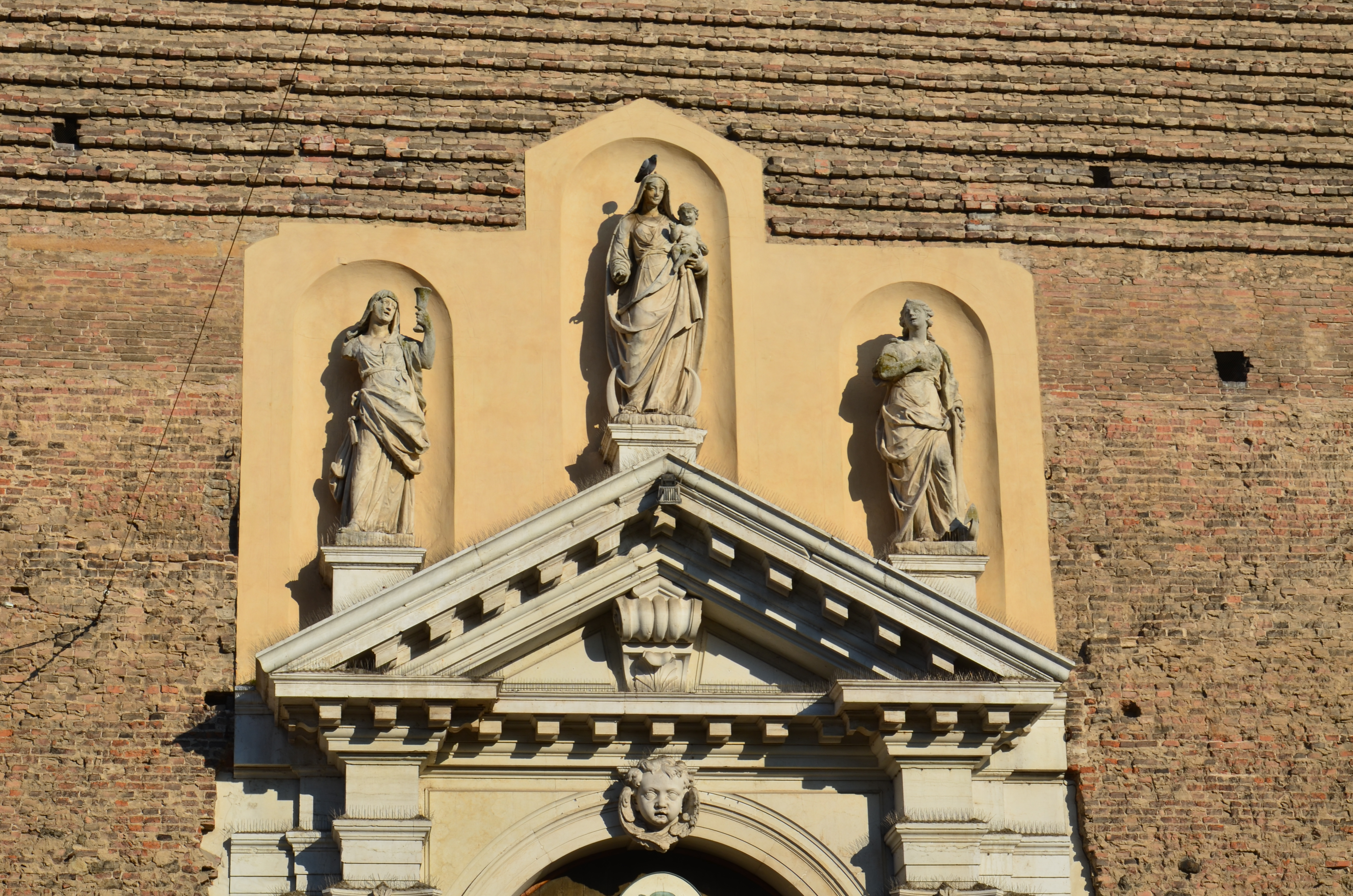
Three statues above the portal by Tommaso Bonazza.

The main portal was completed in 1412, with statues by Bonazza added in 1736–1737. The piazza in front of the church has a statue of Petrarch. On the left flank of the church is a commemorative plaque dedicated to parishioners who died during the second world war.

=== Interior ===
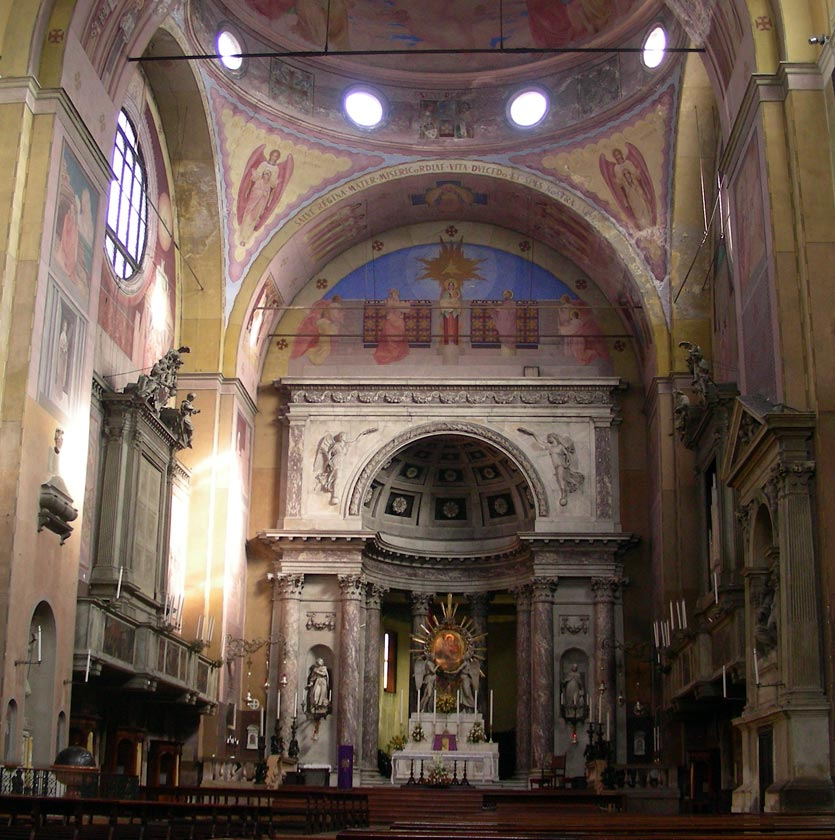
Interior

The counterfacade has a canvas depicting the Annunciation by Dario Varotari the Younger. The water fonts at the entrance were sculpted by Giovanni Bonazza.

The main altar has a detached fresco depicting the Virgin and child by Stefano Dall'Arzere. In 1576, while the bubonic plague afflicted the town, this venerated image was carried in procession through the city from its original location near the Palazzo del Capitanio to this church. The ebbing of the plague was attributed to the miraculous icon. Every February 2, during the Festa dei Lumini recalls this event. An 18th-century bas-relief depicts the Last Supper while the organ on the left depicts Stories of the Image of the Madonna of the Carmine by Battista Bissoni. The apse was richly decorated by Antonio Noale. The walls have large 17th-century canvases, depicting Saints of the Carmelite order and Stories of the Old Testament.

A recent restoration of the central nave, revealed Renaissance frescoes depicting prophets and sybils.

One of the chapels to the right of the entrance has the processional statue of the Madonna del Carmine, which is carried through the streets of the quarter, every July 16. Other works in the interior include:

- Statue, third altar on right by Giovanni Bonazza;
- Mother of Zebede before Christ, 6th altar on right by Padovanino;
- Funeral monument of Tiberio Deciani, a Paduan lawyer, on the right pilaster of below the dome, sculpted by Francesco Segala, addossato al pilastro destro di sostegno della cupola.

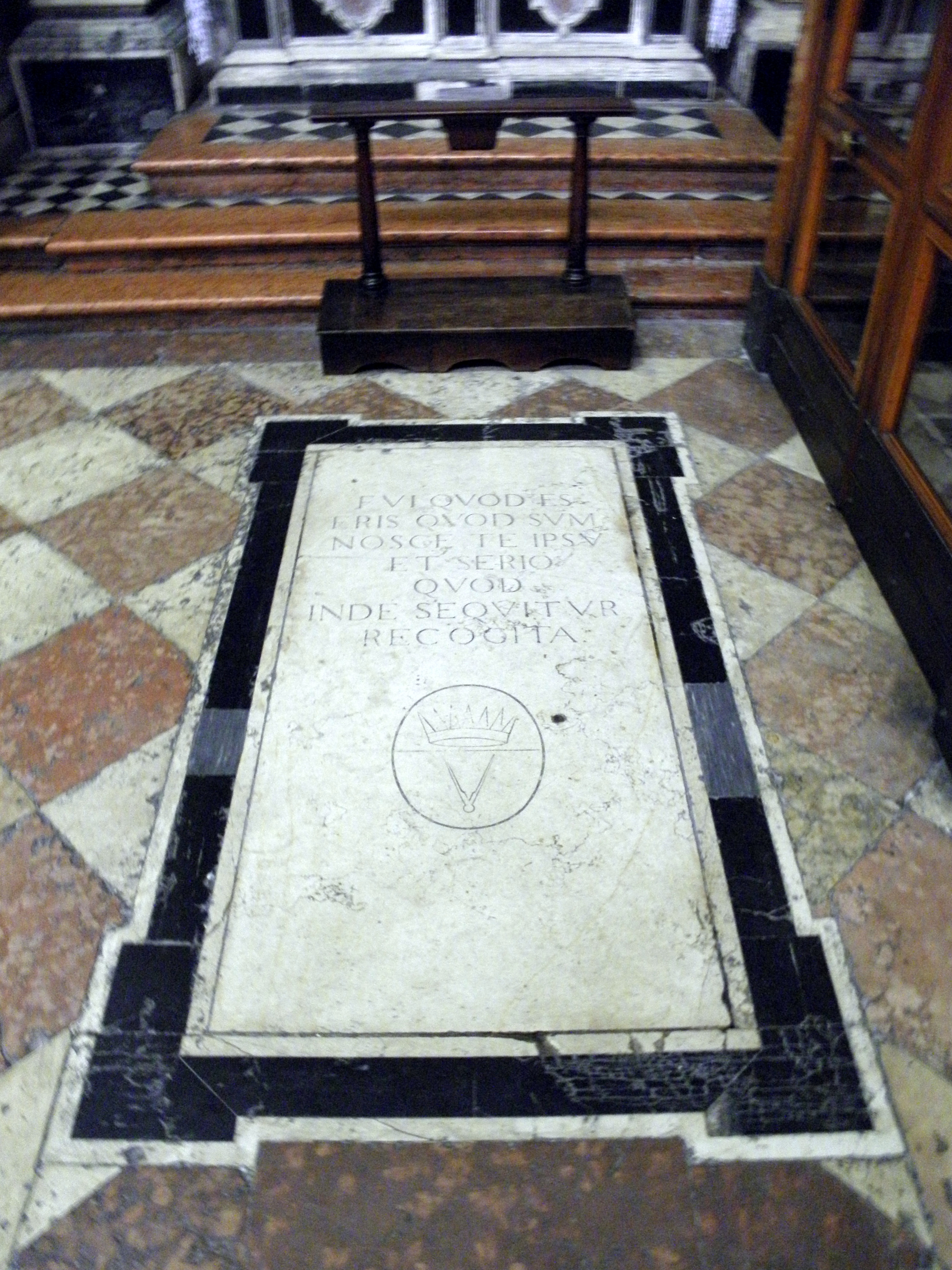
Funeral plaque of Ludovico Justachini

The pavement is made from polychrome marble. The Polyptych of Lazarus by Francesco Squarcione, now in the Museo Civici of Padua, was originally in this church.

== Scuola del Carmine ==
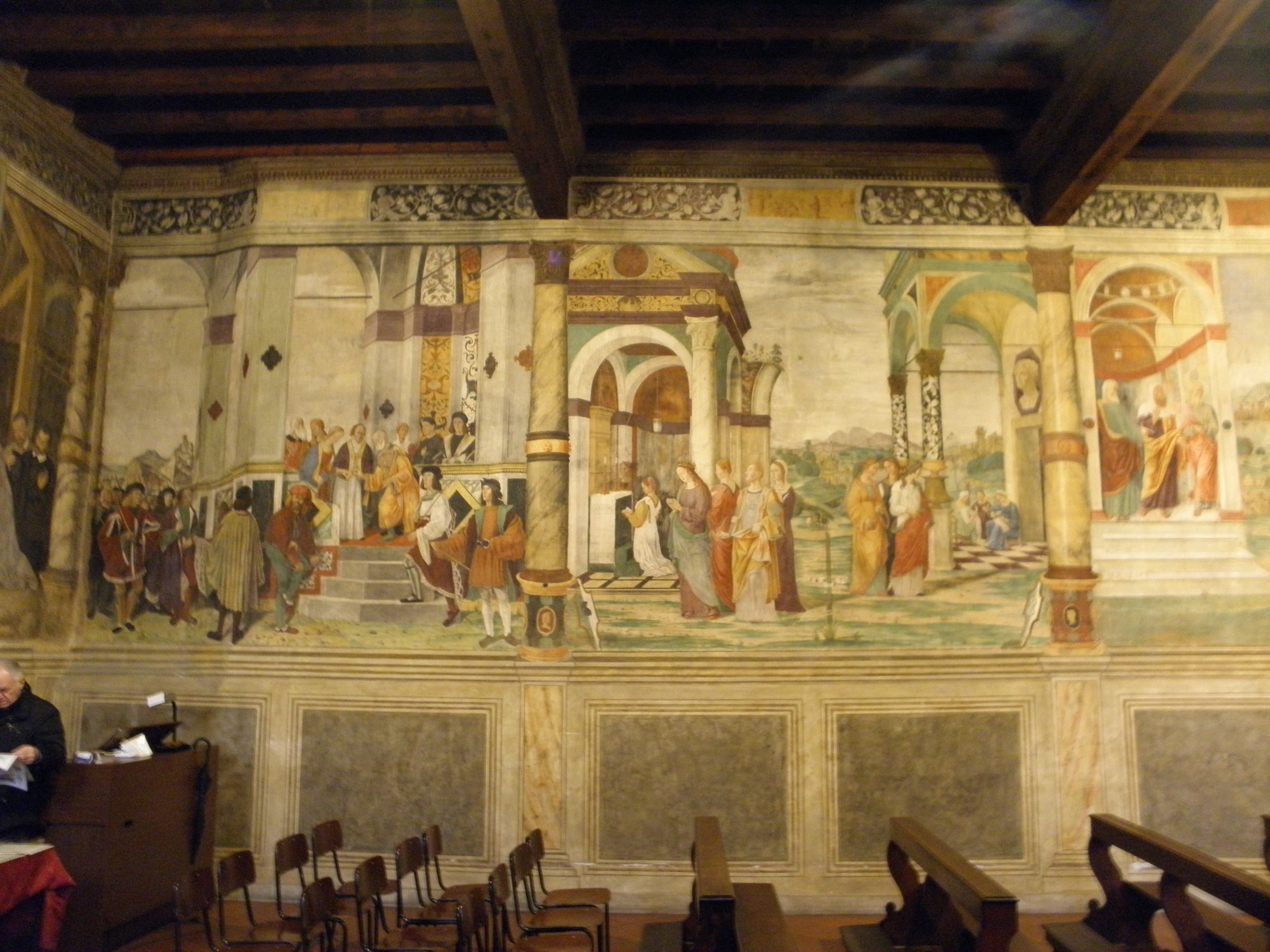
Giulio Campagnola frescoes

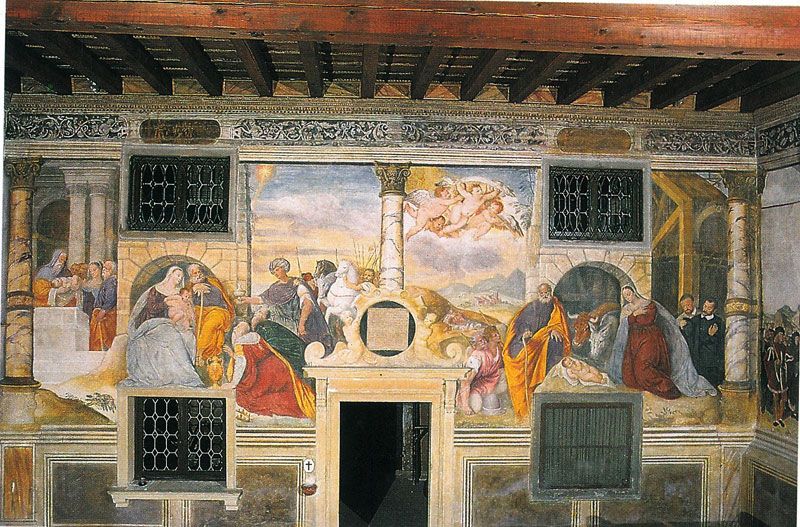
dall'Arzere frescoes

Adjacent to the basilica is a 15th-century cloister and a small prayer hall of the confraternity of the Carmine, known as the Scuola or Scuoletta del Carmine. It has splendid 16th century frescoes, including:

- By Girolamo Tessari
  - Expulsion of Joachim from the Temple
  - Apparition of the Angel to Joachim
  - Holy Family of Nazareth
  - Pentecost
  - Dormition of Mary
  - Assumption of Mary
- By Giulio Campagnola
  - Birth of Mary
  - Presentation of Mary at the Temple
  - Mary visits the Temple
- By Domenico Campagnola
  - Joachim meets St Anne by Domenico Campagnola
- By Stefano dall'Arzere
  - Adoration by Shepherds
  - Adoration by Magi
  - Purification at Temple

== Bibliography (in Italian) ==
- Cesira Gasparotto, S. Maria del Carmine di Padova, Tipografia Antoniana, Padova, 1955
- Fausto Musante, Curiosando per Padova, E.N.Gi. M., Padova, 1983
- Gli affreschi della Scoletta del Carmine, La Garangola, Padova, 1988
- Guida d'Italia (serie Guide Rosse) - Veneto, Touring Club Italiano, ISBN 88-365-0441-8, pp. 470–471
- Angelo Bartuccio, La chiesa di Santa Maria del Carmine e l'architettura quattrocentesca da Firenze a Padova, Tesi di laurea triennale, 2016
