= Holy Cross =

Holy Cross or Saint Cross may refer to:

- the instrument of the crucifixion of Jesus
- Christian cross, a frequently used religious symbol of Christianity
- True Cross, supposed remnants of the actual cross upon which Jesus was crucified
- Feast of the Cross, a commemoration most often celebrated on September 14

Holy Cross may also refer to:

== Educational institutions ==
- College of the Holy Cross, Worcester, Massachusetts
- Holy Cross Crusaders, the athletic teams of Holy Cross at Worcester
- Holy Cross School (disambiguation)
- Holy Cross College (disambiguation)
- Hellenic College and Holy Cross Greek Orthodox School of Theology, in Brookline, Massachusetts
- Pontifical University of the Holy Cross, Rome, Italy

== Churches ==
- Holy Cross Church (disambiguation)

== Communities ==
Order of the Holy Cross refers to several institutions by that name:

- Canons Regular of the Holy Cross of Coimbra (ORC), a Catholic religious order founded in Portugal in 1131 and refounded in 1977
- Canons Regular of the Order of the Holy Cross (OSC), alias the Crosiers, a Catholic religious order founded in 1211 at Clairlieu near Huy, Belgium
- Order of the Holy Cross (OHC), an Anglican Benedictine community based in New York state in the United States
- Patriarchal Order of the Holy Cross of Jerusalem, a knightly order conferred by the Melkite Greek Catholic Church

== Catholic religious orders ==
- Congregation of Holy Cross, priests and brothers
- Heiligenkreuz Abbey, or Holy Cross monastery in Austria
- Holy Cross Abbey, Virginia
- Holy Cross Abbey, in Tipperary, Ireland
- Marianites of Holy Cross, of Le Mans, France, and New Orleans, Louisiana
- Priestly Society of the Holy Cross, association of Opus Dei priests
- Sisters of Holy Cross of Montreal, Canada and Manchester, New Hampshire
- Sisters of the Holy Cross, of Notre Dame, Indiana

== Anglican religious orders ==
- Community of the Holy Cross, a Benedictine community of nuns in England
- Society of the Holy Cross, priests in the Anglican Communion
- Society of the Holy Cross (Korea) (SHC), an order of women in the Anglican Church of Korea
- Order of the Holy Cross (OHC), an Anglican Benedictine community in New York
- Society of the Companions of the Holy Cross (SCHC), lay and ordained members of the Anglican Communion

== Eastern Orthodox associations ==
- Monastery of the Cross, in Jerusalem

== Places ==
=== Canada ===
- Holy Cross Mountain, Alberta

=== Ireland ===
- Holycross, County Tipperary, Ireland
- Holy Cross Church, Ardoyne, Belfast

=== Poland ===
- Świętokrzyskie Mountains (Holy Cross Mountains), in central Poland
- Świętokrzyskie Voivodeship (Holy Cross Voivodeship), a province of central Poland

=== United Kingdom ===
- Holy Cross, Worcestershire, England

=== United States ===
- Holy Cross, Alaska
- Holy Cross, Iowa
- Holy Cross, Kentucky
- Holy Cross, New Orleans, Louisiana
- Holy Cross, Wisconsin
- Holy Cross Township, Clay County, Minnesota
- Holy Cross Cemetery (disambiguation), numerous cemeteries
- Mount of the Holy Cross, a mountain in Colorado
- Holy Cross Parish, New Britain, Connecticut

== Other ==
- Holy Cross dispute, surrounding Holy Cross Primary School in Ardoyne, Belfast in 2001 and 2002
- Holy Cross (film), a 2003 BBC television film based on the events of the Holy Cross dispute.

== See also ==
- Holy Cross Church (disambiguation)
- Cathedral of the Holy Cross (disambiguation)
- Holy Cross Monastery (disambiguation)
- Order of the Holy Cross (disambiguation)
- Holyrood (disambiguation)
- Sainte-Croix (disambiguation)
- Santa Cruz (disambiguation)
- Santa Croce (disambiguation)
- St Cross (disambiguation)
- Hospet Church, in Dakshina Kannada, is one of the ancient churches in the Mangalore Diocese of India
