= Slavery in Argentina =

Slavery in Argentina (Spanish: Esclavitud en Argentina) was a part of Slavery in Latin America. It lasted from the start of Spanish colonization in the Americas and ended in 1853 when Argentina adopted its constitution. By 1812, almost 200,000 enslaved Africans were brought into and distributed throughout the Viceroyalty of the Río de la Plata (now Argentina, Uruguay, and Paraguay), where their descendants still reside. The trade and purchase of slaves in Argentina was legal until 1813 when the Law of Wombs was passed, freeing children born to slaves.

== History ==
=== Slavery and its trade in Argentina ===
==== African enslavement ====
Slavery in the furthest southern reaches of the Spanish Empire was not as prevalent compared to regions with plantation slavery, making for a distinct lack of information on the presence, lives, and conditions of enslaved Africans in Argentina, especially in the 16th and 17th centuries. Despite this, the first account of Africans in present day Argentina dates to around 1585 in Buenos Aires. Additionally, some of the earliest archaeological findings of African communities and the presence of slave labor is dated to the early 17th century in the Catamarca province, with significant populations being present in areas like Santa Cruz and the provincial capital, Ciudad de Catamarca.

By the late 18th century, slavery in the Río de la Plata and in the cities of Buenos Aires and Montevideo expanded greatly, with Montevideo being the key port for slave arrivals, and large amounts of legal and illegal slave trade being done with Buenos Aires. This expansion was halted by the May Revolution of 1810, which led to the Argentine War of Independence, the dissolution of the Viceroyalty of the Río de la Plata, and the passing of the Law of Wombs in 1813. In 1825, Spanish rule in the Río de la Plata ended, and a year later the British-Brazilian Treaty of 1826 was signed, effectively ending the slave trade in any legal capacity, though slavery itself persisted in newly independent Argentina until 1853.

=== Path to freedom and abolition ===
During and after Spanish rule in the Río de la Plata, manumission was one of very few ways slaves could achieve freedom. However, manumissions were typically conditional and did not immediately grant freedom to the enslaved.

In 1813, with the implementation of the Law of Wombs in full swing, the state provided manumissions to enslaved children under the condition that they would work under their former masters for a period of time. Boys worked until they reached the age of twenty, and girls worked until the age of sixteen.

Manumissions were also given out to some slaves by the early Argentine government during the war of independence; slaves were freed, armed, trained, and led by the Argentine military for the duration of the war.

Ultimately, slavery in Argentina was to be abolished completely in 1853 with the adoption of the Argentine Constitution of 1853, with all previous technicalities that allowed slavery to persist being formally addressed under Article 15:

In the Argentine Nation there are no slaves: the few who still exist shall become free as from the swearing of his Constitution; and a special law shall regulate whatever compensation this declaration may give rise to. Any contract for the purchase and sale of persons is a crime for which the parties shall be liable, as well as the notary or officer authorizing it. And slaves who by any means enter the nation shall be free by the mere fact of entering the territory of the Republic.

=== Afro-descendant Identity ===
Despite legally being free in the eyes of the law, many free Afro-descendants and former slaves faced discrimination and less-than-equal treatment in early Argentine society. This culminated in many formerly enslaved Afro-descendant and mixed blood men organizing into the so-called "Black Militias" to exert institutional and social influence in society. This was especially common during the British invasions of the River Plate, the May Revolution, and the Argentine War of Independence, in which black soldiers and black Afro-descendant leaders played a pivotal role.

== See also ==
- Afro-Argentines
- Slavery in Latin America
- Atlantic Slave Trade
- Argentine Confederation
- Abolitionism
- Slavery in Brazil

== Bibliography ==
- Alberto, Paulina L. "Liberta by Trade: Negotiating the Terms of Unfree Labor in Gradual Abolition Buenos Aires (1820s–30s)." Journal of Social History (Oxford) 52, no. 3 (April 2019): 619–51. https://doi.org/10.1093/jsh/shy035.
- Borucki, Alex. "The Slave Trade to the Rı´o de La Plata, 17771812: Trans-Imperial Networks." Colonial Latin American Review, April 1, 2011. https://doi.org/10.1080/10609164.2011.552550
- Borucki, Alex. 2009. "The 'African Colonists' of Montevideo: New Light on the Illegal Slave Trade to Rio de Janeiro and the Río de La Plata (1830–42)." Slavery & Abolition 30 (3): 427–44. https://doi:10.1080/01440390903098037.
- Borucki, Alex. From Shipmates to Soldiers : Emerging Black Identities in the Río de La Plata. Albuquerque: University of New Mexico Press, 2015.
- Candioti, Magdalena; "Sea Notorio": Testamentary Autobiographies of Africans and the Archives on Slavery and Emancipation in Argentina. Hispanic American Historical Review 2026; 12487987. doi: https://doi.org/10.1215/00182168-12487987
- Candioti, Magdalena. 2020. "Free Womb Law, Legal Asynchronies, and Migrations: Suing for an Enslaved Woman's Child in Nineteenth-Century Río de La Plata." The Americas (Washington. 1944) (Berkeley) 77 (1): 73–99. https://doi.org/10.1017/tam.2019.109.
- Chira, Adriana. "Manumission, Custom, and the Laws of Slavery and Freedom in Latin America." History Compass (Oxford) 19, no. 2 (February 2021). https://doi.org/10.1111/hic3.12646.
- Edwards, Erika Denise. Hiding in Plain Sight : Black Women, the Law, and the Making of a White Argentine Republic. 1st ed. Tuscaloosa, Alabama: The University of Alabama Press, 2020.
- Eltis, David, Stanley L. Engerman, K. R. Bradley, Paul Cartledge, Craig Perry, David Richardson, and Seymour Drescher, eds. The Cambridge World History of Slavery. Cambridge ; Cambridge University Press, 2012.
- Ibarra, Antonio. 2022. "Global Trafficking and Local Bankruptcies: Anglo-Spanish Slave Trade in the Rio de La Plata, 1786–1790." Atlantic Studies 19 (3): 430–47. doi:10.1080/14788810.2021.1908084.
- Lyman L. Johnson; "A Lack of Legitimate Obedience and Respect": Slaves and Their Masters in the Courts of Late Colonial Buenos Aires. Hispanic American Historical Review 1 November 2007; 87 (4): 631–657. doi: https://doi-org.proxy-um.researchport.umd.edu/10.1215/00182168-2007-038
- Meisel, Seth. "From Slave to Citizen-Soldier in Early-Independence Argentina." Historical Reflections/Réflexions Historiques (2003): 65-82.
- Parise, Agustin. 2008. "Slave Law and Labor Activities during the Spanish Colonial Period: A Study of the South American Region of Rio de la Plata." Rutgers Law Record 32: 1-30. HeinOnline.
- Retamero, Félix, and Marcos N Quesada. "Landscapes, Settlers, and Workforce in Colonial Catamarca (Northwestern Argentina, 16th-18th c.). A Historical Archaeology Project." Frontiers in Environmental Archaeology 3 (October 2024). https://doi.org/10.3389/fearc.2024.1463835.
- Sobrevilla Perea, Natalia. 2023. "The Abolition of Slavery in the South American Republics." Slavery & Abolition 44 (1): 90–108. doi:10.1080/0144039X.2022.2122814.
- Schavelzon, Daniel, and Flavia Zorzi. 2014. "Afro-Argentine Archaeology: A Case of Short-Sighted Academic Racism during the Early Twentieth Century." The Journal of Pan African Studies (Los Angeles) 7 (7): 79.
- Travieso, Emiliano. 2024. "Environment, Slavery and Agency in Colonial Uruguay, 1750–1810." Past & Present (UK) 265 (1): 57–96. https://doi.org/10.1093/pastj/gtad031.
- Zavala Guillen, Ana Laura. "Geographies of slavery in the Les Malouines/Las Malvinas/Falklands Islands: The Maroon connection." Transactions of the Institute of British Geographers 50, no. 2 (2025): e12711 https://doi.org/10.1111/tran.12711.
