= Santa Cruz Esporte Clube =

Santa Cruz Esporte Clube may refer to:

- Santa Cruz Esporte Clube (AC), a Brazilian football club from Rio Branco, Acre
- Santa Cruz Esporte Clube (MT), a Brazilian football club from Barra dos Bugres, Mato Grosso
