= St Cross =

St Cross (Saint Cross = Holy Cross) may refer to the following places in England:

In Oxford

- St Cross College, Oxford
- St Cross Church, Oxford
- St Cross Road, Oxford

Elsewhere

- St Cross, Llandaff in Cardiff
- St Cross Priory in the Isle of Wight
- St Cross Church, Appleton Thorn in Cheshire
- St Cross Church, Knutsford in Cheshire
- St Cross Church, Middleton in Leeds
- Hospital of St Cross and surrounding area of Winchester, Hampshire
- Hospital of St Cross, Rugby, a hospital in Rugby, Warwickshire
- St Cross Catholic Primary School in Hoddesdon, Hertfordshire
- St Cross Chapel, Reigate, an Anglican chapel in a preserved windmill in Surrey
- Saint Cross Voivodeship in Poland

== See also ==
- Santa Croce (disambiguation)
- Sainte-Croix (disambiguation)
- Santa Cruz (disambiguation)
