= Santa Croce, Padua =

Roman Catholic Church in Padua, Italy

Coordinates: 45.3930°N 11.8712°E

Church of the Holy Cross
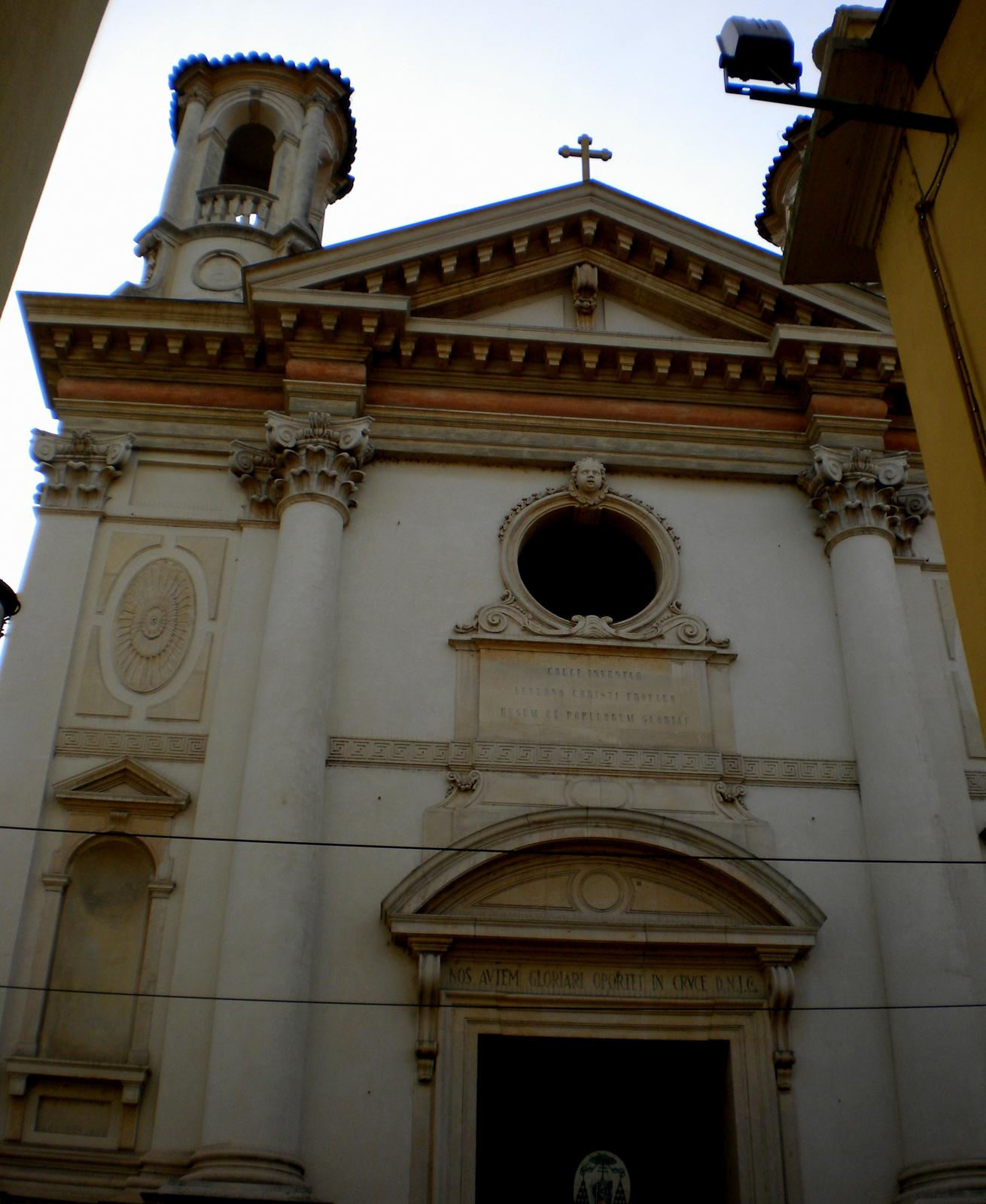
- Main entrance to Santa Croce

Religion
- Affiliation: Roman Catholic
- Diocese: Diocese of Padua
- Province: Veneto
- Rite: Roman Catholic, Western rite
- Year consecrated: 1181

Location
- Location: Padova Padova - Stemma.png
- Interactive map of Church of the Holy Cross

Architecture
- Type: Church
- Style: Baroque
- Groundbreaking: 1737
- Completed: 1749
- Direction of façade: SE

Santa Croce is a Roman Catholic church located on Corso Vittorio Emanuele 178 in Padua, Veneto region, Italy.

== History ==
The church arose adjacent to the oratory of Sant Croce or Sala del Redentore. Documents from 1181 state a chapel at the site, adjacent to a leprosarium, was dedicated to the Holy Cross. The church became a parish in 1308. In 1606, the parish came under the rule of the Somaschi Fathers, who established a school at this site. The commission to build the present Rococo style church was given to a lay brother of the order, Francesco Vecelli (1695–1759). Construction began in 1737 and was completed in 1749. Under Napoleonic rule, the Somaschi were expelled and the church came under control of secular clergy. The belltower was built in 1907.

== Architecture and Decoration ==
The façade was designed to be a monument at the end of the Borgo Santa Croce, running from the Prato della Valle to the outer wall. It has a pediment supported by pilasters and half-columns of Corinthian order. Two circular turrets lighten the architecture. The main door has a curved tympanum under the inscription that commemorates the consecration of the church. The late-Baroque and early Neoclassical design was by the architect Girolamo Frigimelica Roberti of Padua. The bell tower on the side of the twentieth-century church is built on the area of the cemetery.

The well-lit nave features a rich decoration on which is placed a series of openings in fenestrated fake balcony, probably as choirs. The presbytery with semicircular apse is decorated with impressive semi-columns. The ceiling of the church is decorated with coffers, stucco and gilding. The frescoes have been attributed to Gualtieri, Girolamo dal Santo, Domenico Campagnola, and Stefano Dall' Arzere.

The main altar has two angels sculpted by Antonio Bonazza (1698–1763) surmounted by a canopy. The apse has a wooden choir. The church has four altarpieces by Giovanni Battista Mariotti (1690–1748), including depicting the founder of the Somaschi order San Girolamo Miani praying in a grotto. Another fresco depicting the Holy Heart of Jesus was painted by Giovanni Dandolo.

Through a door on the right, one can enter the Cappella della Madonna della Neve (Chapel of the Madonna of the Snows) and the Sala del Redentore or Oratory of the Confraternity of the Redeemer. The oratory dates to the 15th century and was the home of the former Confraternity of the Corpo di Cristo di Santa Croce established at the end of the 15th century. The confraternity was involved in tending to the poor and burying the impoverished. The frescoes of the oratory have been restored.

Cleric Somascan entrusted the large ceiling fresco, depicting the Exaltation of the Cross, and the oval dome of the presbytery to the Venetian Nicolo Baldassini. The paintings at side altars and walls of the apse were commissioned Giambattista Mariotti. The location of the paintings was altered with the arrival of the early 800 Salus Populi Patavini, venerated seventeenth-century wooden statue of Our Lady of Health, coming from the oratory and linked to the plague that struck the city in the seventeenth century.

On the first altar to the right from the entrance is a painting of the Mariotti with St. John Nepomuk, St. Francis of Paola and Antonio. The wooden choir is below Adoration of the True Cross by St Helena was painted by Antonio Bonazza. On the first altar on the left from the entrance there is the painting of St. Jerome by Emiliani.

The one story building to the right of the entrance of this church, with a marble portal and plaque above, is the Oratorio del Redentore or Scuola del Santissimo Sacramento di Santa Croce. The interior was frescoed circa 1537 with biblical scenes; the works have been attributed to Girolamo Dal Santo, Domenico Campagnola, Stefano Dall'Arzere, and others. The confraternity was suppressed in the 19th century. The works extant include a Last supper; a Prayer at Gesthemane, a Kiss of Judas, Christ before Caiphas, Christ before Pilate; Christ made to wear crown with thorns, Christ carries the Cross, Christ kneels before Cross, Crucifixion, Deposition, and Burial of Christ, and Sacrifice of Isaac, portraits of the patrons of the city: Saints Giustina, Prosdocimo, Antonio, and Daniele.
