= Monastery of the Cross (disambiguation) =

The Monastery of the Cross is a Christian monastery near Jerusalem.

Monastery of the Cross may also refer to:

- Çatalçam, Dargeçit
- Cross Temple, Fangshan
- Jvari Monastery

== See also ==
- Holy Cross Monastery
- Holy Cross Abbey (disambiguation)
