= Santa Croce =

Santa Croce is Italian for 'Holy Cross' and may refer to:

- Santa Croce (Venice), one of the six sestieri (districts) of Venice, Italy.
- The Pontifical University of the Holy Cross (Italian: Pontificia Università della Santa Croce) in Rome, Italy.
- Many churches, including:
  - Santa Croce, Florence, built 1294–1385 and the burial place of several notable Italians
  - Santa Croce della Foce, Gubbio, Umbria, built in the 13th century
  - Basilica di Santa Croce (Lecce), built 1549–1646
  - Santa Croce, Parma, built 1222–1666
  - Santa Croce, Padua, built 1737–1749
  - Santa Croce in Fossabanda, Pisa, built 1325–19th century
  - Santa Croce e San Bonaventura alla Pilotta, Rome, built 1625–19th century
  - Santa Croce in Gerusalemme, Rome, consecrated around 325
  - Santa Croce alla Lungara, Rome, consecrated 1619
  - Santa Croce degli Armeni, Venice, built 13th century, consecrated 1688
  - Santa Croce in Via Flaminia, Rome, built 1913, consecrated 1981

== People ==
- House of Santacroce, a noble Roman family. To this belongs among others:
  - Prospero Santacroce, 16th-century cardinal
- Cecilia Santacroce (born 1990), Italian archer
- Fabiano Santacroce (born 1986), Italian-Brazilian football player
- Isabella Santacroce (born 1970), Italian novelist
- Girolamo Santacroce, a 16th-century Italian sculptor and painter

== Places ==
- Santa Croce sull'Arno, town in Tuscany
- Santa Croce Camerina, town in Sicily

=== Villages ===
- Santa Croce di Magliano, a commune in Campobasso, Molise
- Santa Croce di Roccaromana, a commune in Caserta, Campania
- Santa Croce del Sannio, a commune in Benevento, Campania

== See also ==
- Santa Cruz (disambiguation)
- Sainte-Croix (disambiguation)
- Holy Cross (disambiguation)
