= Holy Cross Monastery =

Holy Cross Monastery refers to the Monastery of the Cross, Jerusalem, Israel, where tradition places the tree from which the Cross of Jesus was made.

Holy Cross Monastery can also refer to:

== Europe ==
- Heiligenkreuz Abbey, Austria
- Santa Cruz Monastery, Coimbra, Portugal
- Św. Krzyż Monastery, Łysa Góra, Poland
- Holy Cross Exaltation Monastery, Kizlyar, Russia
- Holy Cross Exaltation Monastery, Poltava, Ukraine

== New World (US and Australia) ==
- Holy Cross Orthodox Monastery (Castro Valley, California), US
- Holy Cross Monastery (Mangrove Mountain, New South Wales), Australia, an Eastern Orthodox monastery
- Holy Cross Monastery (Wayne, West Virginia), US
- Holy Cross Monastery (West Park, New York), US
- Holy Cross Monastery and Chapel, Cincinnati, US

== See also ==
- Holy Cross Abbey (disambiguation)
- Santa Croce (disambiguation) (Italian for 'Holy Cross')
- Monastery of the Cross (disambiguation)
