= Santa Cruz Province =

Santa Cruz Province may refer to:

- Santa Cruz Province, Argentina
- Santa Cruz Province, Peru
- Province of Santa Cruz de Tenerife, Spain

Santa Cruz Department may refer to:

- Santa Cruz Department, in Bolivia
- Santa Cruz Department, Chile, a former administrative unit centred on Santa Cruz, Chile

== See also ==
- Santa Cruz (disambiguation)
