= Order of the Holy Cross (disambiguation) =

Order of the Holy Cross refers to several institutions by that name:

- Order of the Holy Cross (OHC) an Anglican Benedictine community founded in 1884, based in New York state
- Crosiers, a group of similar Catholic orders, including:
  - Canons Regular of the Holy Cross (ORC), a Catholic religious order founded in Portugal in 1131 and refounded in 1977
  - Canons Regular of the Order of the Holy Cross (OSC), alias the Crosiers, a Catholic religious order founded in 1211 at Clairlieu near Huy, Belgium
- Patriarchal Order of the Holy Cross of Jerusalem, an ecclesiastical order conferred by the Melkite Catholic Church

== See also ==
- Holy Cross (disambiguation)
