= Cathedral of the Holy Cross =

Cathedral of the Holy Cross or Holy Cross Cathedral may refer to:

== Africa ==
- Cathedral of the Holy Cross, Lagos, the Roman Catholic Cathedral in Lagos, Nigeria
- Cathedral of the Holy Cross, Lusaka, the Anglican cathedral in Lusaka, Zambia

== Asia ==
- Cathedral of the Holy Cross, Gyumri, an Armenian Catholic cathedral in Gyumri, Armenia
- Armenian Cathedral of the Holy Cross, on Akdamar Island in Van Lake, Turkey
- Cathedral of the Holy Cross, Tyre, Lebanon
- Cathedral of the Holy Cross, Acre, Israel

== Europe ==
- Cathedral of the Holy Cross and Saint Eulalia, the Roman Catholic cathedral in Barcelona, Catalonia, Spain
- Church of the Holy Cross, Nin, the former Roman Catholic cathedral of Nin, Croatia
- Cathedral Basilica of the Holy Cross, Opole, Poland
- Temple of the Exaltation of the Holy Cross, a Greek Catholic cathedral in Bratislava, Slovakia
- Russian Church, Geneva, a Russian Orthodox cathedral in Geneva, Switzerland
- Greek Catholic Cathedral, Uzhhorod, Ukraine

== North America ==
- Cathedral of the Holy Cross (Boston), the current Roman Catholic cathedral in Boston
- Holy Cross Church, Boston, the first Roman Catholic cathedral in Boston
- Metropolitan Cathedral Church of the Holy Cross, Our Lady of Regla, and St Francis of Assisi, the Roman Catholic cathedral in Chihuahua, Mexico
- Holy Cross Armenian Cathedral (Montebello, California), an Armenian Apostolic Church cathedral
- Holy Cross African Orthodox Pro-Cathedral, New York City
- Holy Cross Cathedral, Loganville, Georgia, the cathedral of the Anglican Diocese of the South

== Oceania ==
- Holy Cross Cathedral, Geraldton, the cathedral of the Anglican Diocese of North West Australia, in Geraldton, Western Australia
- Holy Cross Pro-Cathedral, Vanimo, the pro-cathedral of the Roman Catholic Diocese of Vanimo, Papua New Guinea
