= Bourneville-Sainte-Croix =

- Commune
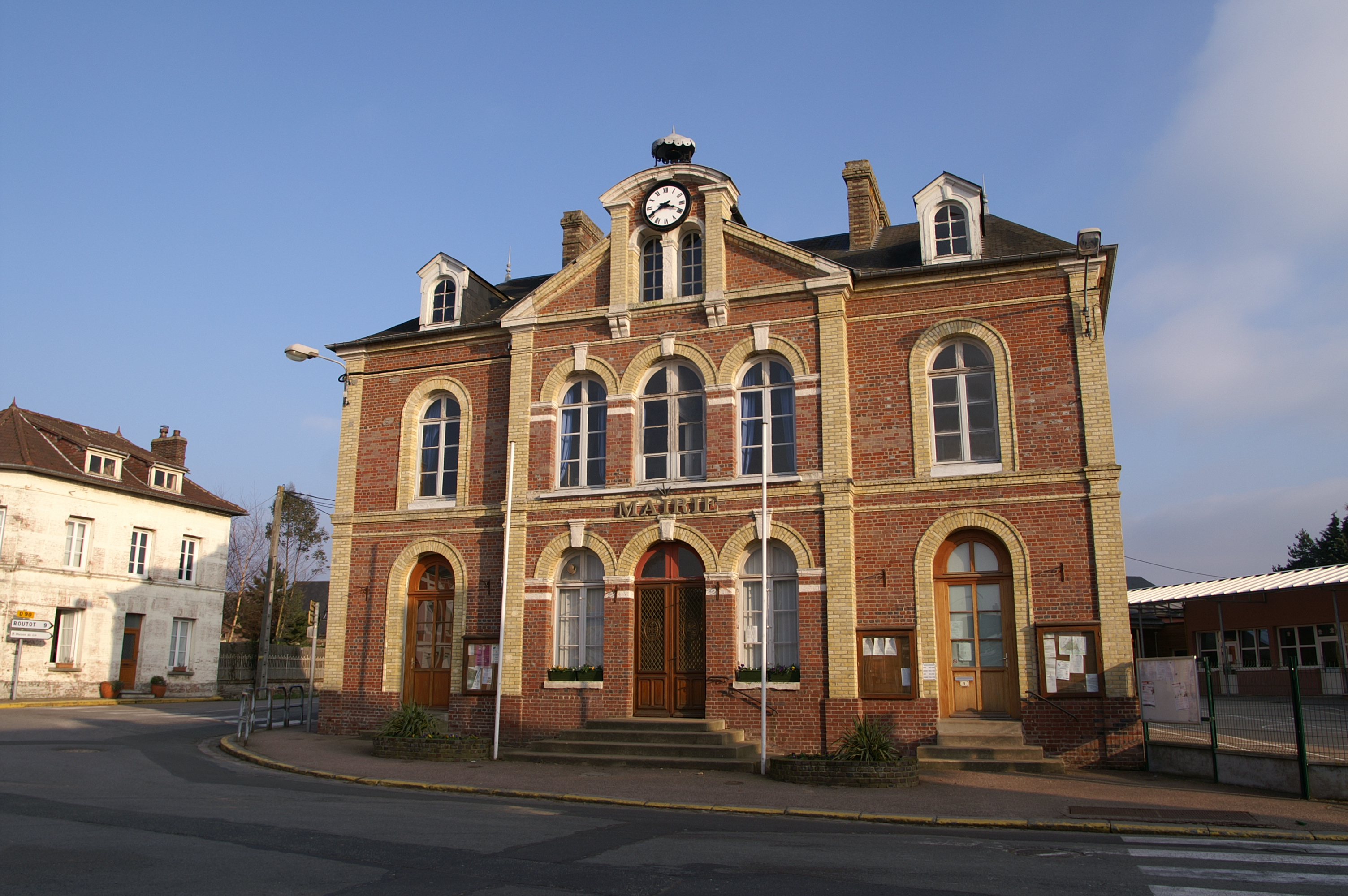
- The town hall in Bourneville
- Location of Bourneville-Sainte-Croix
- Location within France Location within Normandy
- Coordinates: 49°23′24″N 0°37′16″E
- Country: France
- Region: Normandy
- Department: Eure
- Arrondissement: Bernay
- Canton: Bourg-Achard

Government
  - Mayor (2020–2026): Gwendoline Presles
- Area^{1}: 15.83 km^{2} (6.11 sq mi)
- Population (2023): 1,252
  - Density: 79.09/km^{2} (204.8/sq mi)
- Time zone: UTC+01:00 (CET)
  - Summer (DST): UTC+02:00 (CEST)
- INSEE/Postal code: 27107 /27500
- ^{1} French Land Register data, which excludes lakes, ponds, glaciers > 1 km^{2} (0.386 sq mi or 247 acres) and river estuaries.

Bourneville-Sainte-Croix (French pronunciation: [buʁnəvil sɛ̃t kʁwa]) is a commune in the department of Eure, northern France. The municipality was established on 1 January 2016 by merger of the former communes of Bourneville and Sainte-Croix-sur-Aizier.

== See also ==
- Communes of the Eure department
