= Bourneville, Eure =

Bourneville
- Part of Bourneville-Sainte-Croix
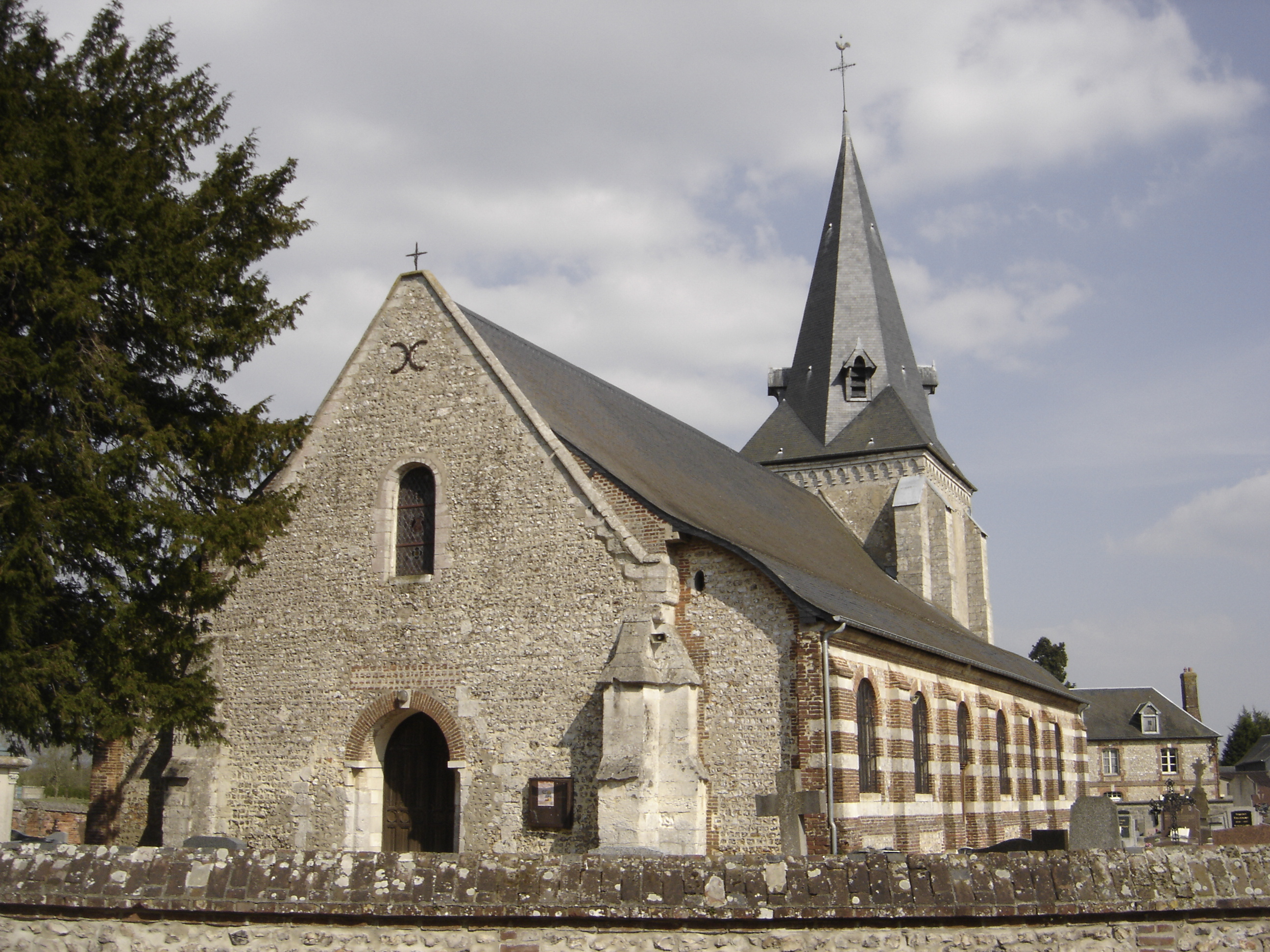
- Location of Bourneville
- Location within France Location within Normandy
- Coordinates: 49°23′30″N 0°37′18″E
- Country: France
- Region: Normandy
- Department: Eure
- Arrondissement: Bernay
- Canton: Bourg-Achard
- Commune: Bourneville-Sainte-Croix
- Area^{1}: 11.01 km^{2} (4.25 sq mi)
- Elevation: 180 m (590 ft)
- Highest elevation: 137 m (449 ft)
- Lowest elevation: 63 m (207 ft)
- Population (2023): 975
  - Density: 88.6/km^{2} (229/sq mi)
- Time zone: UTC+01:00 (CET)
  - Summer (DST): UTC+02:00 (CEST)
- Postal code: 27500
- ^{1} French Land Register data, which excludes lakes, ponds, glaciers > 1 km^{2} (0.386 sq mi or 247 acres) and river estuaries.

Bourneville (French pronunciation: [buʁnəvil]) is a former commune in the Eure department in Normandy in northern France. On 1 January 2016, it was merged into the new commune of Bourneville-Sainte-Croix.

== See also ==
- Communes of the Eure department
