= Santa Cruz Formation (disambiguation) =

Santa Cruz Formation may refer to:

- Santa Cruz Formation an Early Miocene geologic formation in Argentina and Chile, defining the Santacrucian
- Santa Cruz Formation, Philippines, a Middle Pleistocene geologic formation in the Zambales Mountains in the Philippines

== See also ==
- Santa Cruz Mudstone, a Late Miocene geologic formation in California
- Santa Cruz Member, a member of the Late Jurassic Unidade Bombarral formation in Portugal
