= Santa Cruz, Paraíba =

Coordinates: 6°31′58″S 38°03′43″W

- Municipality
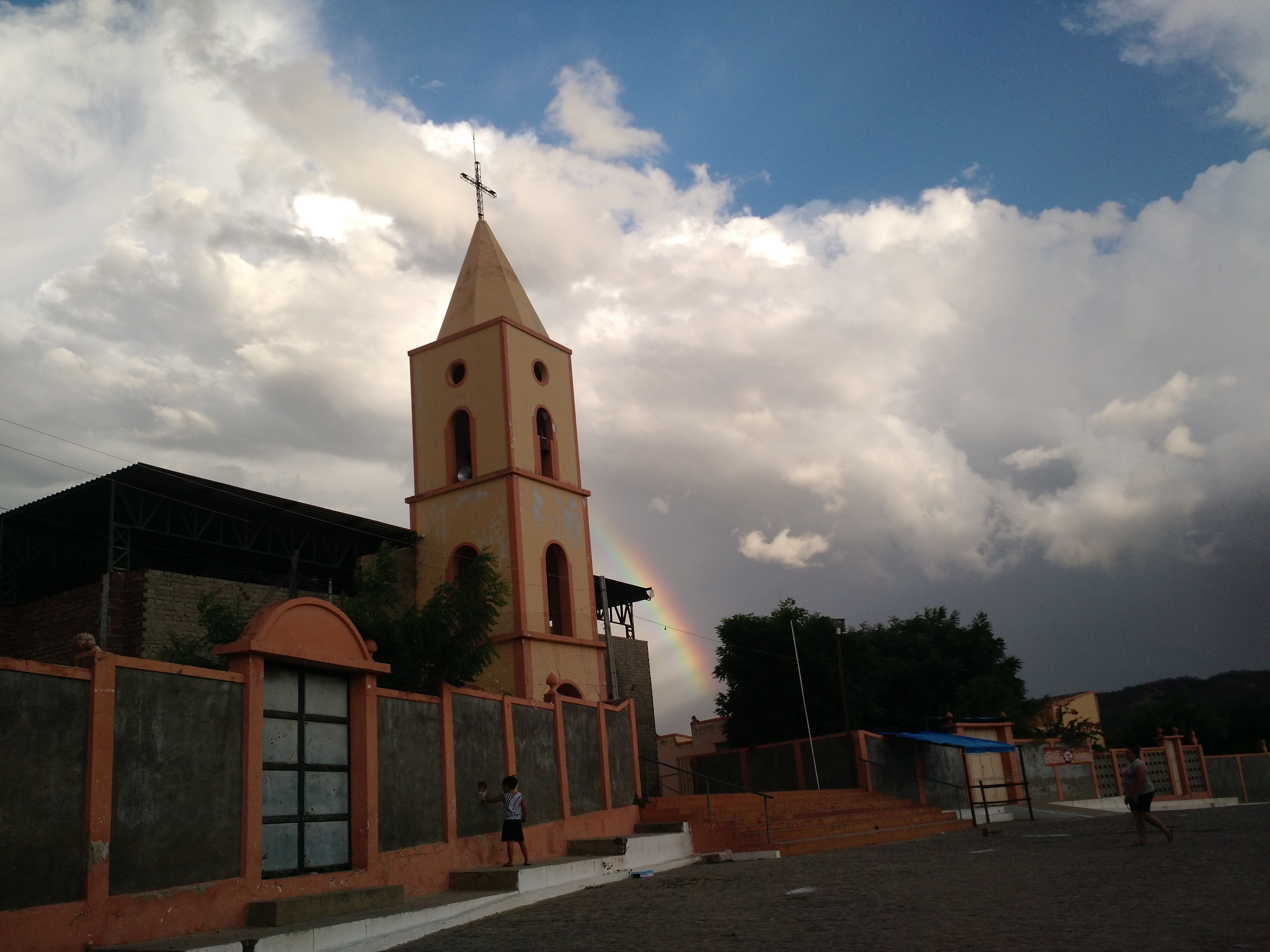

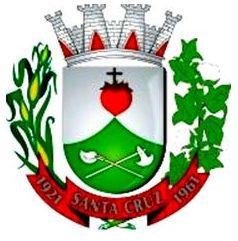
- Flag Coat of arms
- Interactive map of Santa Cruz, Paraíba
- Country: Brazil
- Region: Northeast
- State: Paraíba
- Mesoregion: Sertao Paraibana

Population (2020)
  - Total: 6,581
- Time zone: UTC−3 (BRT)

Santa Cruz is a municipality in the state of Paraíba in the Northeast Region of Brazil.

== See also ==
- List of municipalities in Paraíba
