= Santa Cruz dos Milagres =

Coordinates: 5°48′S 41°58′W

- Municipality
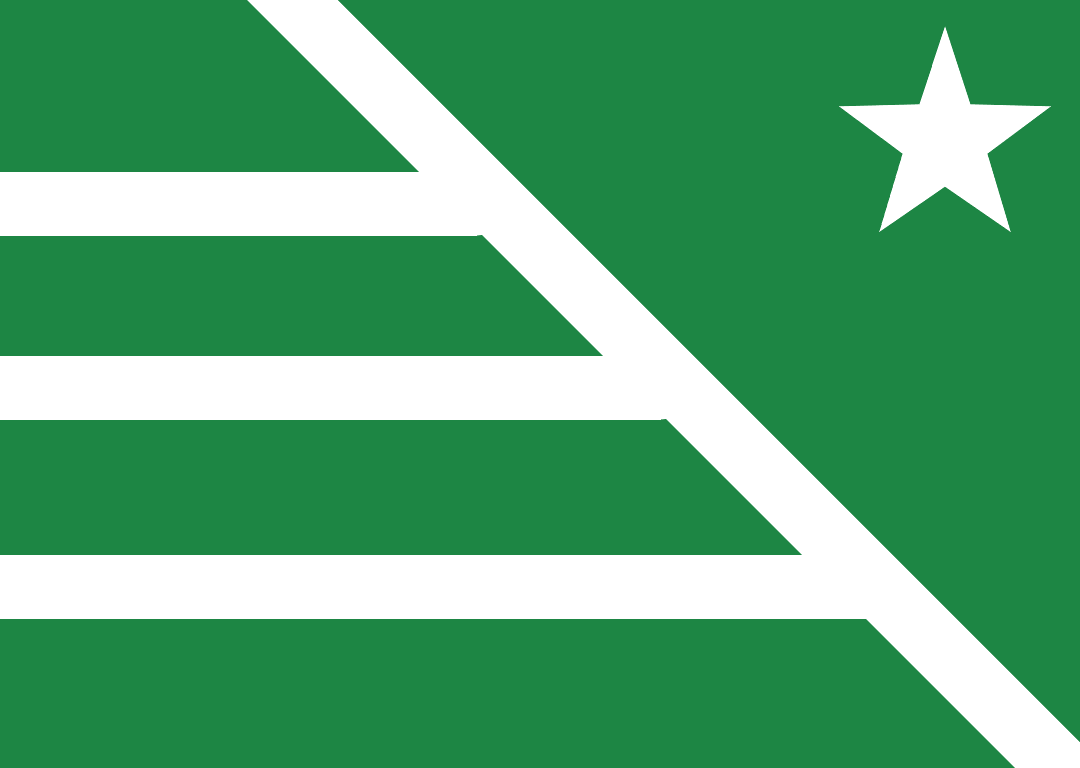
- Flag

- Country: Brazil
- Region: Nordeste
- State: Piauí
- Mesoregion: Centro-Norte Piauiense

Population (2020)
  - Total: 4,033
- Time zone: UTC−3 (BRT)

Santa Cruz dos Milagres is a municipality in the state of Piauí in the Northeast region of Brazil.

== See also ==
- List of municipalities in Piauí
