= Santa Cruz Canton =

Santa Cruz Canton may refer to:

- Santa Cruz (canton), Costa Rica
- Santa Cruz Canton, Ecuador
