= Santa Cruz, Pima County, Arizona =

Santa Cruz, Arizona
- Populated place
- Location within the state of Arizona Santa Cruz (the United States)
- Coordinates: 32°02′04″N 111°54′25″W
- Country: United States
- State: Arizona
- County: Pima
- Elevation: 2,812 ft (857 m)
- Time zone: UTC-7 (Mountain (MST))
  - Summer (DST): UTC-7 (MST)
- Area code: 520
- FIPS code: 04-63910
- GNIS feature ID: 24603

Santa Cruz is a populated place situated in Pima County, Arizona, United States. It has an estimated elevation of 2,812 feet (857 m) above sea level. It is one of two locations in Arizona with this name, the other being the census-designated place in Pinal County.
