= Santa Cruz, Rivas =

Santa Cruz
- Village
- Location in Nicaragua
- Coordinates: 11°29′17″N 85°35′17″W
- Country: Nicaragua
- Department: Rivas Department
- Time zone: UTC-6 (Nicaragua Standard Time)

Santa Cruz is a village on the island of Ometepe in Lake Nicaragua, Rivas, Nicaragua. There's also a Playa Santa Cruz; the beach of Santa Cruz. Santa Cruz is famous for its hostel.
