= Santa Cruz da Vitória =

- Municipality
- Location in Brazil
- Coordinates: 14°57′39″S 39°48′43″W
- Country: Brazil
- Region: Nordeste
- State: Bahia

Population (2020)
  - Total: 6,278
- Time zone: UTC−3 (BRT)

Santa Cruz da Vitória is a municipality in the state of Bahia in the North-East region of Brazil.

== See also ==
- List of municipalities in Bahia
