= Sainte-Croix-sur-Aizier =

- Part of Bourneville-Sainte-Croix
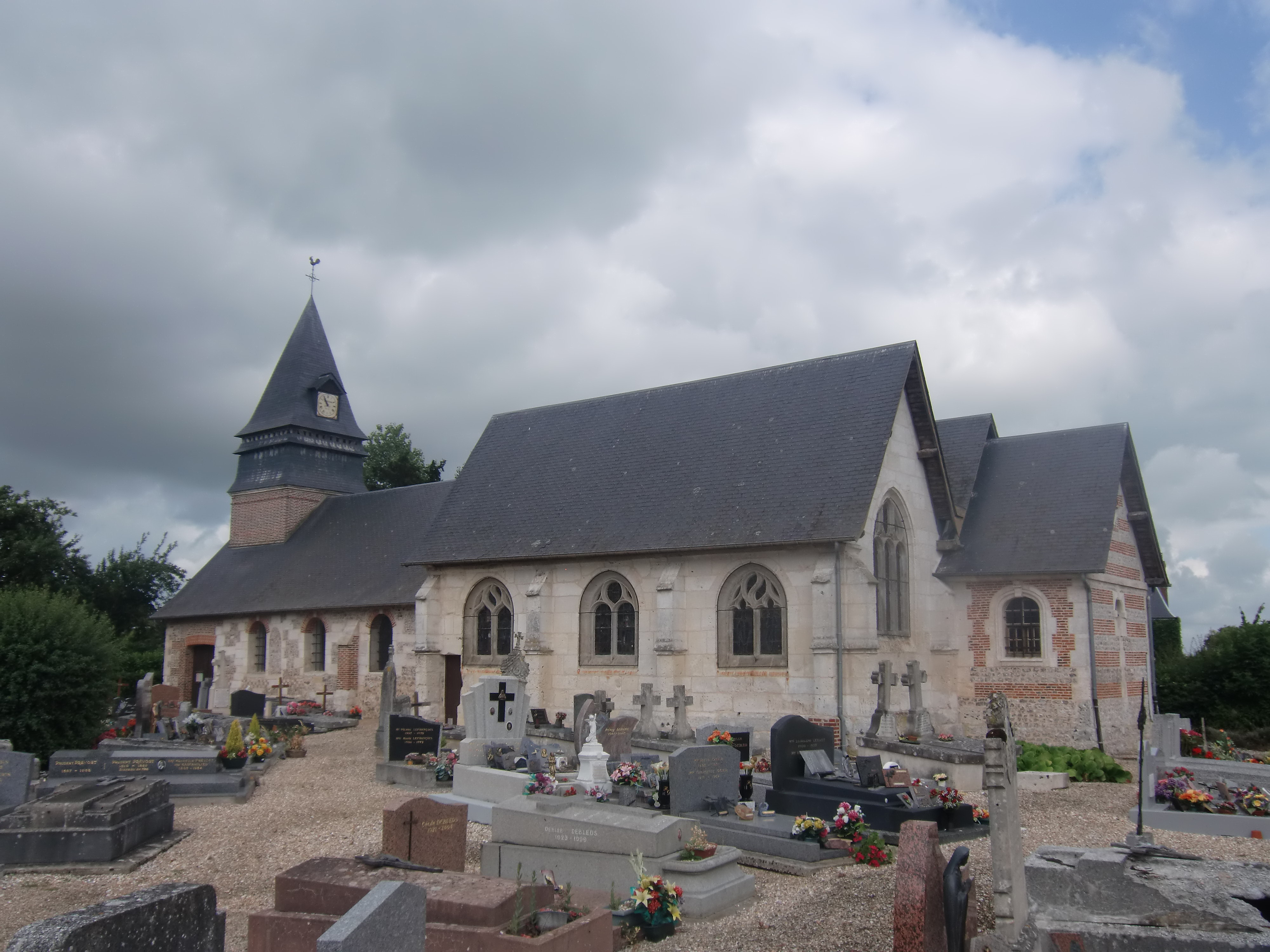
- Location of Sainte-Croix-sur-Aizier
- Location within France Location within Normandy
- Coordinates: 49°25′05″N 0°37′50″E
- Country: France
- Region: Normandy
- Department: Eure
- Arrondissement: Bernay
- Canton: Bourg-Achard
- Commune: Bourneville-Sainte-Croix
- Area^{1}: 4.82 km^{2} (1.86 sq mi)
- Elevation: 120 m (390 ft)
- Highest elevation: 132 m (433 ft)
- Lowest elevation: 35 m (115 ft)
- Population (2023): 277
  - Density: 57.5/km^{2} (149/sq mi)
- Time zone: UTC+01:00 (CET)
  - Summer (DST): UTC+02:00 (CEST)
- Postal code: 27500
- ^{1} French Land Register data, which excludes lakes, ponds, glaciers > 1 km^{2} (0.386 sq mi or 247 acres) and river estuaries.

Sainte-Croix-sur-Aizier (French pronunciation: [sɛ̃t kʁwa syʁ ɛzje], literally Sainte-Croix on Aizier) is a former commune in the Eure department in Normandy in northern France. On 1 January 2016, it was merged into the new commune of Bourneville-Sainte-Croix.

== See also ==
- Communes of the Eure department
