= Holy Cross Abbey (disambiguation) =

Holy Cross Abbey may refer to:

in China

- Yenki Abbey, Yenki, Jilin Province

in France

- Holy Cross Abbey (Poitiers)

in Ireland

- Holy Cross Abbey, in Tipperary
- Holy Cross Abbey (Arklow), in Wicklow

in the United States

- Holy Cross Abbey (Cañon City), listed on the NRHP in Colorado
- Holy Cross Abbey, Virginia

== See also ==
- Holy Cross Monastery (disambiguation)
