= Holy Cross Armenian Cathedral (Montebello, California) =

Cathedral in California, United States

Coordinates: 34.0214°N 118.1061°W

The Holy Cross Armenian Apostolic Cathedral in Montebello, California, is the cathedral of the Western Prelacy of the Armenian Apostolic Church of America. The cathedral was consecrated by Karekin II, Catholicos of the Holy See of Cilicia, on November 11, 1984.

Montebello is home to the oldest Armenian Community in Los Angeles County. There is also an Armenian Martyrs Monument at Bicknell Park.

The annual Armenian Food Fair is hosted in May every year at Holy Cross Cathedral in Montebello.

In the 2004 film Sideways, Jack and Christine’s marriage takes place at this cathedral.
