= Santa Cruz, Camarines Norte =

Santa Cruz is the name of three barangays in the Camarines Norte province:

- Santa Cruz in Jose Panganiban
- Santa Cruz in Labo
- Santa Cruz in Talisay
