= Battle of Santa Cruz =

Battle of Santa Cruz may refer to:

- Battle of Santa Cruz de Tenerife (1657), during the Anglo-Spanish War in the Canary Islands, Spain
- Battle of Santa Cruz de Tenerife (1706), during the War of the Spanish Succession in the Canary Islands, Spain
- Battle of Santa Cruz de Tenerife (1797), during the French Revolutionary Wars in the Canary Islands, Spain
- Battle of Santa Cruz de Rosales (1848), during the Mexican–American War in Chihuahua, Mexico
- Battle of Santa Cruz (1899), during the Philippine–American War at Santa Cruz, Laguna, Philippines
- Battle of the Santa Cruz Islands (1942), during World War II between U.S. and Japanese forces in the Pacific theater
