= Sainte-Croix =

Sainte-Croix (Holy Cross) may refer to:

== In Canada ==
- Sainte-Croix, Quebec, in the Lotbinière Regional County Municipality

== In France ==
- Holy Cross Abbey (Poitiers) (Sainte-Croix Abbey), in Poitiers, France
- Sainte-Croix, Ain, in the Ain department
- Sainte-Croix, Aisne, in the Aisne department
- Sainte-Croix, Aveyron, in the Aveyron department
- Sainte-Croix, Dordogne, in the Dordogne department
- Sainte-Croix, Drôme, in the Drôme department
- Sainte-Croix, Lot, in the Lot department
- Sainte-Croix, Tarn, in the Tarn department
- Sainte-Croix-à-Lauze, in the Alpes-de-Haute-Provence department
- Sainte-Croix-aux-Mines, in the Haut-Rhin department
- Sainte-Croix-de-Caderle, in the Gard department
- Sainte-Croix-de-Mareuil, in the Dordogne department
- Sainte-Croix-de-Quintillargues, in the Hérault department
- Sainte-Croix-du-Verdon, in the Alpes-de-Haute-Provence department
- Sainte-Croix-du-Mont, in the Gironde department
- Sainte-Croix-en-Bresse, in the Saône-et-Loire department
- Sainte-Croix-en-Jarez, in the Loire department
- Sainte-Croix-en-Plaine, in the Haut-Rhin department
- Sainte-Croix-Grand-Tonne, in the Calvados department
- Sainte-Croix-Hague, in the Manche department
- Sainte-Croix-sur-Aizier, in the Eure department
- Sainte-Croix-sur-Buchy, in the Seine-Maritime department
- Sainte-Croix-sur-Mer, in the Calvados department
- Sainte-Croix-sur-Orne, in the Orne department
- Sainte-Croix-Vallée-Française, in the Lozère department
- Sainte-Croix-Volvestre, in the Ariège department

== In Mauritius ==
- Sainte-Croix, Mauritius, in the Port Louis District

== In Switzerland ==
- Sainte-Croix, Switzerland, in the Canton of Vaud

== See also ==
- St. Croix (disambiguation)
- Holy Cross (disambiguation)
