= Domenico Campagnola =

Italian painter

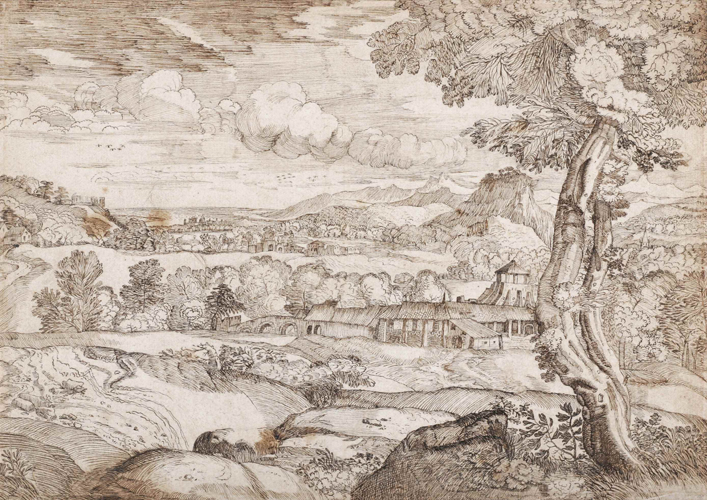
Landscape drawing by Campagnola; these were his most influential works

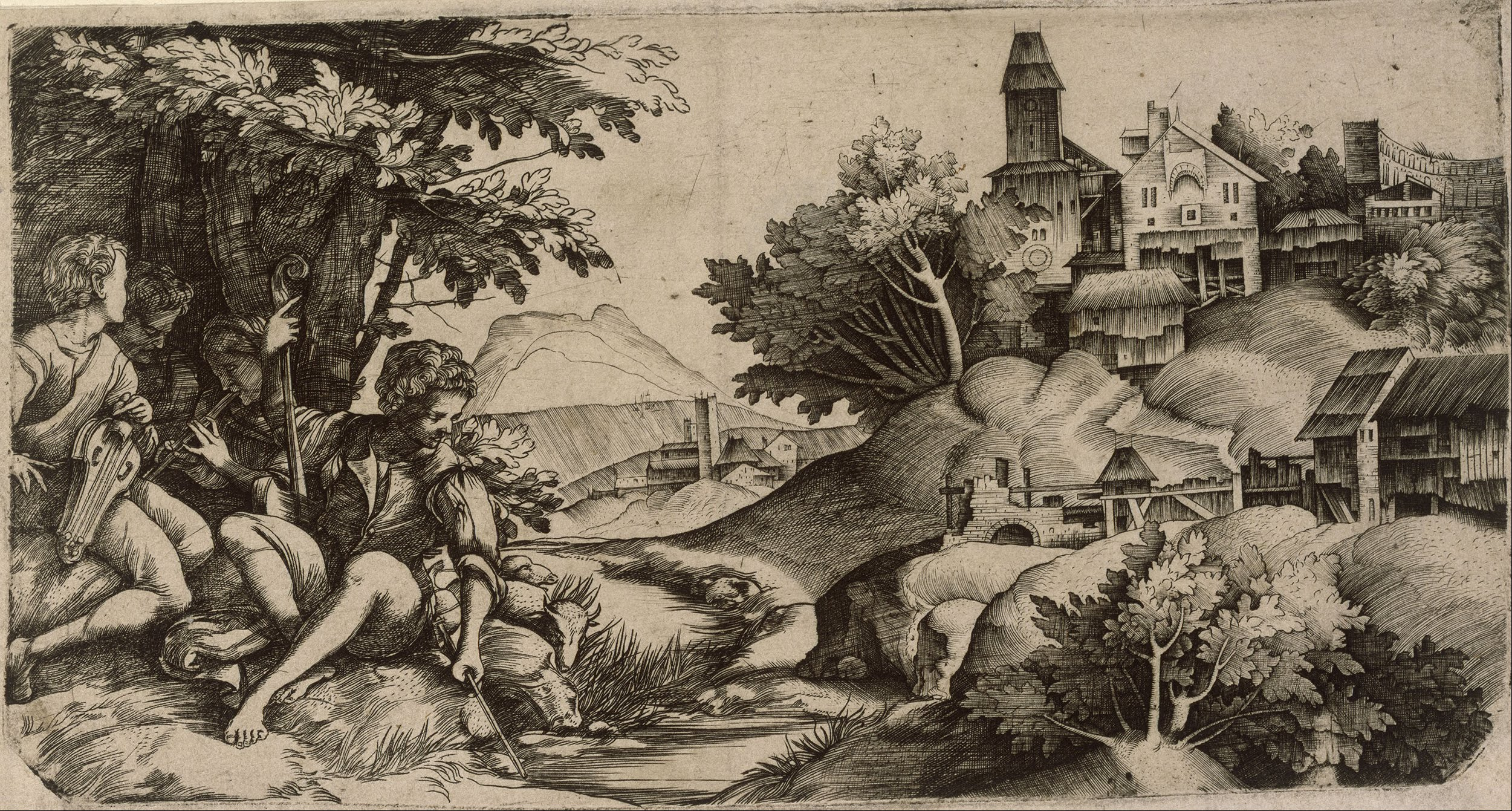
Concert by a brook, engraving with his father Giulio Campagnola

Domenico Campagnola (c. 1500–1564) was an Italian painter and printmaker in engraving and woodcut of the Venetian Renaissance, but whose most influential works were his drawings of landscapes.

== Life and work ==
Born probably in Venice, he was the pupil of his father, the leading engraver and painter Giulio Campagnola. He appears to have been adopted by his father as a young boy. His grandfather, Girolamo Campagnola was a famous humanist and painter in Padua (end of the 15th century). He was presumably trained initially by his father, and may also have been a pupil of Titian, with whose workshop he was clearly associated. Much of his early painting may be of landscape backgrounds in Titians. He is mainly remembered for his prints and his drawings, especially of landscapes. In his lifetime he was a successful painter, mostly in Padua (Giulio's home town), where he was mainly based from the early 1520s onwards, until his death there in 1564. Mostly he painted on walls, including decorative schemes, but portraits and landscapes are also attributed to him. His works as a painter are not highly regarded by modern art historians though some landscapes are of high quality.

His engravings, fourteen of which are known, were produced in a short burst in 1517-18, when he was still in his teens; most are dated 1517. On some his name appears in full, on others, abbreviated "Do.Cap" or "Do.Camp." (for "Domenico Campagnola"). He appears to have cut his own blocks for his woodcuts, using a very different style from the professional cutters most artists employed. Like his father he was a versatile and experimental artist. His landscape drawings were produced as finished products for sale; he was one of the first artists to do this. He may have included etching on some plates, including the Old soldier and shepherd.

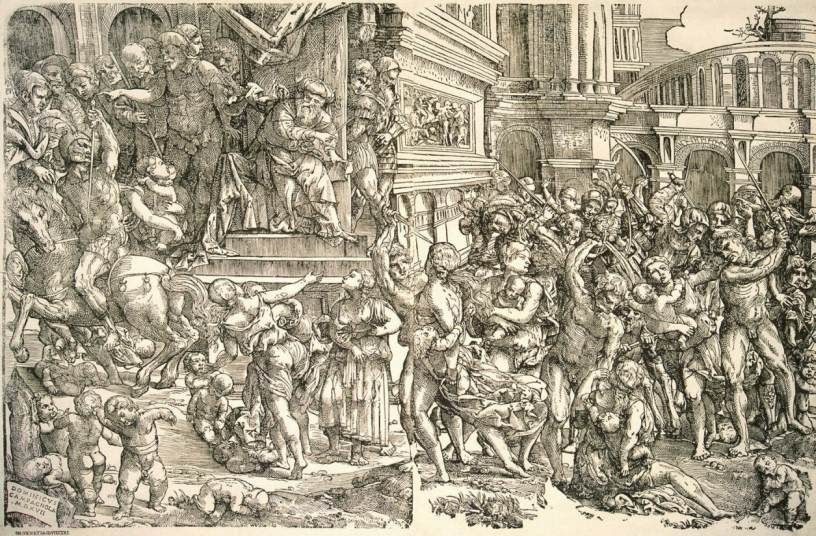
Massacre of the Innocents, woodcut in two blocks

His most successful prints include his Old soldier and shepherd , his Battle of naked men, and his Assumption.

One engraving appears to have been begun by his father and completed by Domenico, perhaps after his father died. He fell out seriously with Titian, perhaps as a result of the sharp practice which Peter Dreyer has discovered in recent years; it is thought to be Domenico who took very faint counter-proof impressions of some Titian woodcuts, which were then worked over in ink and passed off as Titian's preliminary drawings. This may well have played a part in bringing to an end Titian's first period of serious interest in making prints based on his work; it was to be some decades before he began collaborating with Cornelius Cort in producing engravings. None of Campagnola's engravings are direct renderings of paintings by Titian, but many are similar in composition, though very different in handling, even allowing for the difference in medium.

Many drawings long considered by Titian are now thought to be by Domenico, and attribution of many is still disputed, as some earlier drawings are disputed between his father Giulio, Titian, and Giorgione. Drawings have also been reattributed from Domenico to Giulio Campagnola. He began by closely following the style of his father and Titian in producing landscapes with figures, but produced larger numbers, and made them directly for sale, so that it is largely through him that this influential typology became widely known. According to James Byam Shaw:"In later drawings, Campagnola debased this style of landscape into a kind of facile mannerism; nevertheless he furnished inspiration for Italian draughtsmen for generations to come, including ... Agostino and Annibale Carracci, and Domenichino and Grimaldi later still."

== Surviving paintings ==
Most of his paintings have been destroyed. Fresco paintings are to be seen in the Scuola del Santo at Padua and in Venice, marked by fresh animated colour and easy brilliant technique. These are sometimes also attributed to his father. A fine panel picture by him representing Adam and Eve is in the Pitti Palace, Florence.
