= Santa Cruz de Cocachacra District =

Coordinates: 11.9112°S 76.5409°W

Santa Cruz de Cocachacra Kukachakra
- District
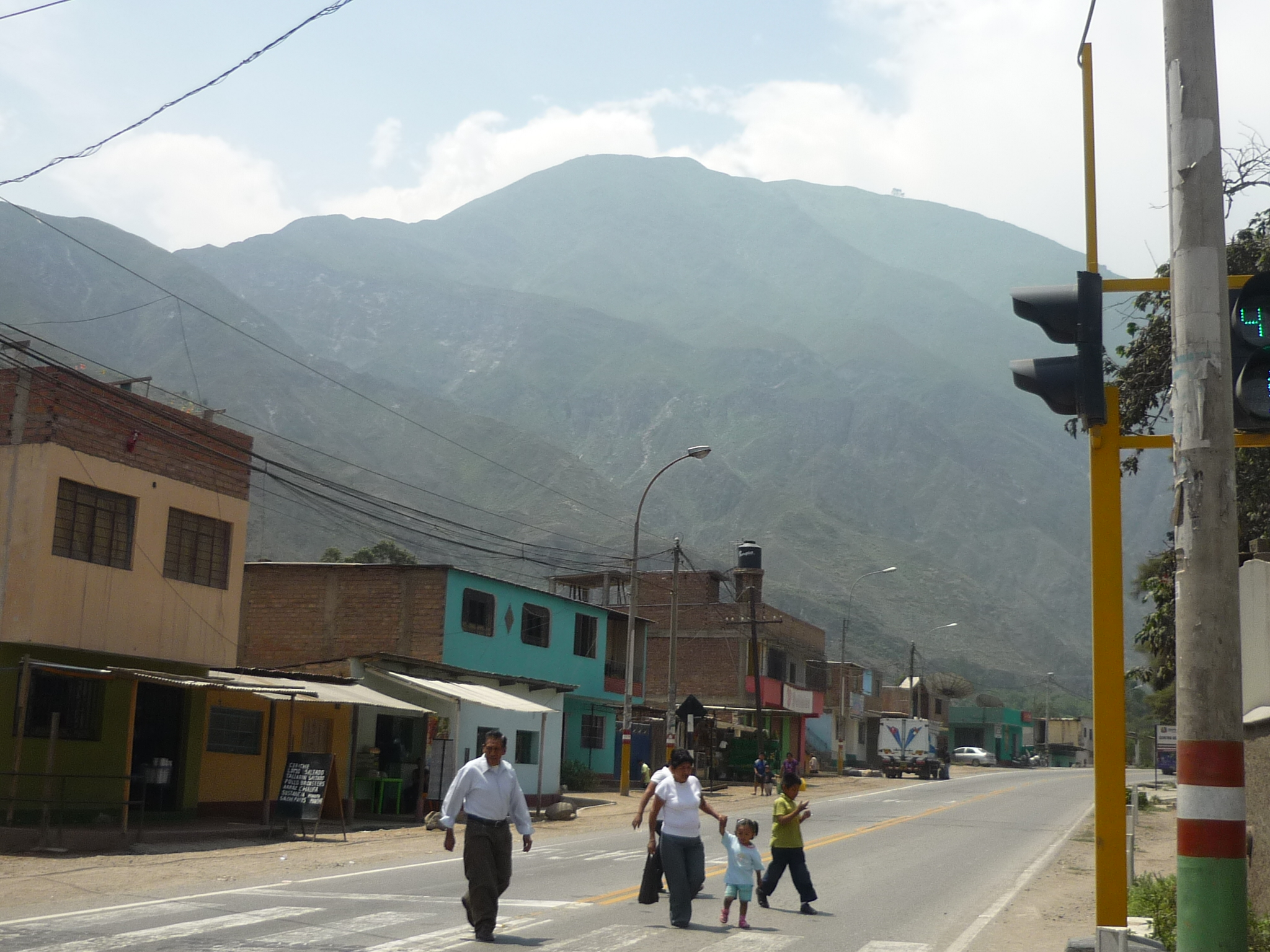
- View of the town of Cocachacra
- Interactive map of Santa Cruz de Cocachacra
- Country: Peru
- Region: Lima
- Province: Huarochirí
- Founded: October 29, 1959
- Capital: Cocachacra

Government
  - Mayor: Neptali Carrasco Torres (2019-2022)

Area
  - Total: 41.5 km^{2} (16.0 sq mi)
- Elevation: 1,426 m (4,678 ft)

Population (2017)
  - Total: 2,486
  - Density: 59.9/km^{2} (155/sq mi)
- Time zone: UTC-5 (PET)
- UBIGEO: 150727

Santa Cruz de Cocachacra District is one of thirty-two districts of the Huarochirí Province, located in the Department of Lima in Peru. The district was created by the Law No. 13261 on October 29, 1959, during the second presidency of Manuel Prado Ugarteche.
