= Stefano Dall' Arzere =

Italian painter

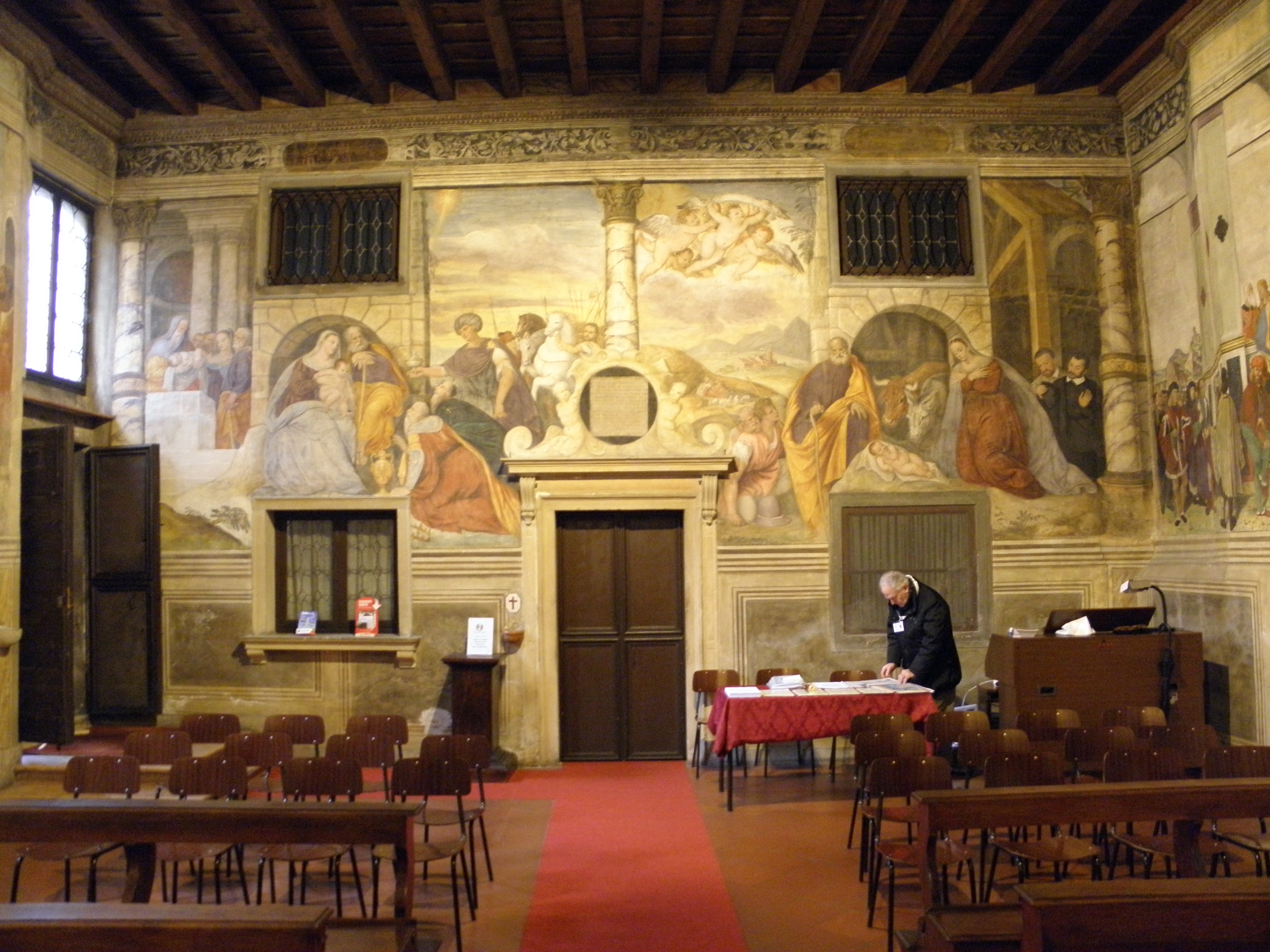
Padua, Scuola (or Scoletta) del Carmine: frescos of Nativity of Jesus Christ.

Stefano Dall' Arzere or Stefano Dell'Arzere was an Italian painter of the second half of the 16th century.

According to Ridolfi and others, Dall' Arzere was a native of Padua. He painted numerous altar-pieces for the churches and convents of that city. In the Chiesa degli Eremitani, he painted some subjects from the Old Testament, and two pictures of 'St. Peter' and 'St. Paul,' and in the church of the Servite monastery the principal altar-piece is by him.
