= Santa Cruz Esporte Clube (MT) =

Extinct soccer club

Santa Cruz de Barra dos Bugres
- Full name: Santa Cruz Esporte Clube
- Founded: December 25, 1982
- Ground: Municipal Raimundão, Barra do Bugres, Brazil
- President: Márcio Ribeiro Sales
Home colors	Away colors

Santa Cruz Esporte Clube was a football (soccer) club from Barra do Bugres, Mato Grosso, Brazil. It was founded on December 25, 1982.
