= Santa Cruz de Toledo District =

Coordinates: 7.3446°S 78.8370°W

Santa Cruz de Toledo
- District
- Interactive map of Santa Cruz de Toledo
- Country: Peru
- Region: Cajamarca
- Province: Contumazá
- Founded: January 29, 1965
- Capital: Santa Cruz de Toledo

Government
  - Mayor: Arsenio Wilfredo Plasencia Plasencia

Area
  - Total: 64.53 km^{2} (24.92 sq mi)
- Elevation: 2,400 m (7,900 ft)

Population (2005 census)
  - Total: 1,097
  - Density: 17.00/km^{2} (44.03/sq mi)
- Time zone: UTC-5 (PET)
- UBIGEO: 060506

Santa Cruz de Toledo District is one of eight districts of the province Contumazá in Peru.
