= Santa Cruz, Catamarca =

Coordinates: 28°30′S 65°40′W

Santa Cruz (Catamarca)
- Municipality and village
- Interactive map of Santa Cruz (Catamarca)
- Country: Argentina
- Province: Catamarca Province
- Time zone: UTC−3 (ART)

Santa Cruz (Catamarca) is a village and municipality in Catamarca Province of Argentina.
