= Santa Cruz de Chuca District =

Coordinates: 8.1197°S 78.1428°W

Santa Cruz de Chuca
- District
- Interactive map of Santa Cruz de Chuca
- Country: Peru
- Region: La Libertad
- Province: Santiago de Chuco
- Founded: February 20, 1959
- Capital: Santa Cruz de Chuca

Government
  - Mayor: Mariano Felipe Ruiz Rojas

Area
  - Total: 165.12 km^{2} (63.75 sq mi)
- Elevation: 2,924 m (9,593 ft)

Population (2005 census)
  - Total: 3,478
  - Density: 21.06/km^{2} (54.55/sq mi)
- Time zone: UTC-5 (PET)
- UBIGEO: 131007

Santa Cruz de Chuca District is one of eight districts of the province Santiago de Chuco in Peru.
