= Cruz =

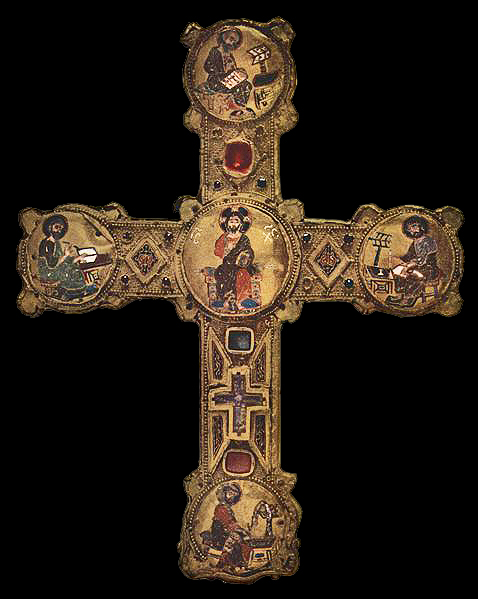
- The Christian Cross
- Pronunciation: Spanish: IPA: [kɾuθ] or [kɾus]; Portuguese: IPA: [kɾuʃ]
- Language: Spanish, Portuguese

Origin
- Meaning: Cross
- Region of origin: Spain, Portugal

Other names
- Variant forms: "Vera Cruz", "Santa Cruz", "De la Cruz"

Cruz is primarily a surname, but is also used as a first name mainly in the US and the UK. It is of Iberian origin, first found in Castile, Spain, and later spread throughout the territories of the former Spanish and Portuguese Empires. In Spanish and Portuguese, the word means "cross", either the Christian cross or the figure of transecting lines or ways. For example, in the Philippines, the adopted Tagalog word is rendered to "krus" in plain usage, but the Spanish spelling survives as a surname.

The word "Cruz", as well as "Vera Cruz" ("True Cross") and "Santa Cruz" ("Holy Cross") are used as surnames and toponyms. Its origin as a surname particularly flourished after the Alhambra Decree of 1492 and the increasing activities of the Spanish Inquisition, when New Christian families with Crypto-Jewish, Moorish, and/or mixed religious heritage converted to the state-enforced religion of Catholicism and subsequently fashioned and adopted surnames with unambiguous religious affiliation.

As a first name in the US, Cruz is ranked #303 in 2024 according to social security. It saw a boost in popularity after David Beckham named one of his sons Cruz.

== People with the surname ==
=== General ===
- Alberto Cruz (disambiguation), multiple people
- Alejandro Cruz (disambiguation), multiple people
- Alex Cruz (disambiguation), multiple people
- Arturo Cruz (1923–2013), Nicaraguan rebel leader
- Carlos Cruz (disambiguation), multiple people
- Cláudia Cruz (born 1967), Brazilian journalist
- Isagani Cruz (c. 1924–2013), Filipino judge
- Juan-Carlos Cruz (born 1962), Dominican American celebrity chef
- Maria Silva Cruz (1915–1936), Spanish anarchist
- Maximiano Tuazon Cruz (1923–2013), Filipino Roman Catholic bishop
- Nicky Cruz (born 1938), Puerto Rican-American ex-gang leader and religious minister
- Nikolas Cruz (born 1998), American criminal, perpetrator of the Parkland high school shooting
- Oswaldo Cruz (1872–1917), Brazilian physician, bacteriologist, and epidemiologist
- Richard Cruz (disambiguation), multiple people
- Terri Cruz (1927–2017), American community organizer

=== Arts ===
==== General ====
- Amina Cruz, American photographer
- Claudia Cruz (born 1986), Dominican Miss World contestant 2004
- Gaspar da Cruz (ca. 1520–1570), Portuguese Dominican friar, author of the first European book on China
- Gemma Cruz-Araneta (born 1943), Filipino crowned Miss International; writer and director
- José María Cruz Novillo (1936–2026), Spanish sculptor, engraver, painter, and designer
- Lizania Cruz, Dominican artist
- Mae Cruz-Alviar (born 1974), Filipino film and television director
- Nilo Cruz (born 1962), Cuban-American playwright and Pulitzer prize winner

==== Actors and Actresses ====
General

- Ernesto Gómez Cruz (1933–2024), Mexican actor
- Ileana D'Cruz, Indian actress from Goa
- Isadora Cruz (born 1998), Brazilian actress
- Mónica Cruz (born 1977), Spanish dancer and actress; sister of Penélope Cruz
- Penélope Cruz (born 1974), Spanish actress
- Leslie Fields-Cruz, American journalist

American

- Raphael Cruz, American acrobat, Cirque du Soleil performer and actor
- Wilson Cruz (born 1973), Puerto Rican-American actor
- Alexis Cruz (born 1974), Puerto Rican-American actor
- Brandon Cruz (born 1962), American actor and musician
- Raymond Cruz (born 1964), American actor

Filipino

- Donna Cruz (born 1977), Filipina actress and singer
- Ella Cruz (born 1996), Filipino Actress
- Geneva Cruz (born 1976), Filipino actress and singer
- Jesse Cruz, birth name of Ricky Belmonte (1947–2001), Filipino actor
- John Lloyd Cruz (born 1983), Filipino actor
- Rayver Cruz (born 1989), Filipino actor/dancer
- Rodjun Cruz (born 1987), Filipino actor/dancer
- Sheryl Cruz (born 1974), Filipino actress
- Sunshine Cruz (born 1977), Filipino actress
- Tirso Cruz III (born 1953), Filipino actor

==== Musical Artists ====
General

- Celia Cruz (1924–2003), Cuban salsa singer
- Gilda Cruz-Romo (1940–2025), Mexican operatic soprano
- Simon Cruz, Swedish singer of glam metal band Crashdïet
- Taio Cruz, British singer (born Adetayo Ayowale O. A. Onile-Ere)
- Toni Cruz (1946–2025), Spanish singer and television producer.

American

- Adam Cruz, American jazz drummer
- Tony Sunshine (Antonio Cruz, born 1977), Puerto Rican R&B singer
- Bobby Cruz (born 1937 or 1938), Puerto Rican salsa singer and religious minister
- Jason Cruz (born 1974), American musician, artist, poet

=== Politicians ===
- Agay Cruz (born 1980), Filipino lawyer and politician
- Ambrosio Cruz Jr. (born 1947), Filipino politician
- Angel Cruz, a member of the Pennsylvania House of Representatives, 180th District
- Angelina Cruz (born 1979), Wisconsin politician
- Benjamin Cruz (born 1951), Guamanian politician
- Catalina Cruz (born 1980s), New York politician
- Gina Cruz Blackledge (born 1969), Mexican politician, Senator from Baja California in 2018–2024
- Inmaculada Cruz (1960–2013), Spanish politician
- Nelsy Cruz (1982–2025), Dominican politician
- Ted Cruz (Rafael Edward Cruz; born 1970), Canadian-American politician and United States Senator from Texas since 2013
- Zenaida Cruz-Ducut (born 1956), Filipino lawyer and politician

=== Sports ===
- Adolfo Schwelm Cruz (1923–2012), Argentine Formula One race car driver
- Beatriz Cruz (born 1980), Puerto Rican track and field athlete
- Carl Bryan Cruz (born 1991), Filipino basketball player
- Dominick Cruz (born 1985), American professional mixed martial artist
- Edvandro Cruz (born 1978), Brazilian mountain biker
- Enrique Cruz Jr. (born 2003), American football player
- Fran Cruz (born 1991), Spanish footballer
- Iohana Cruz (born 1980), Cuban diver
- Jericho Cruz (born 1990), Filipino basketball player
- Jervy Cruz (born 1986), Filipino basketball player
- Joaquim Cruz (born 1963), Brazilian athlete and Olympic gold medal winner
- Juana Cruz (1917–1981), Spanish woman bullfighter
- Julio Ricardo Cruz (born 1974), former Argentine football player
- Leo Cruz (born 1957), Dominican boxing champion
- Nelson Cruz (athlete) (born 1977), long-distance runner from Cape Verde
- Raúl Ceferino Cruz (1934–1985), Argentine chess master
- Rolando Cruz (born 1939), Puerto Rican pole vaulter
- Roque Santa Cruz (born 1981), Paraguayan footballer
- Steve Cruz (born 1963), American boxer
- Victor Cruz (born 1986), American football player
- Wendy Cruz (born 1976), Dominican cyclist

==== Baseball ====
- Fernando Cruz (baseball) (born 1990), Puerto Rican baseball player
- Frank Cruz (born c. 1959), American college baseball coach
- Jesús Cruz (born 1995), Mexican baseball player
- José Cruz also known as Cheo Cruz (born 1947), Puerto Rican baseball player
- José Cruz Jr. (born 1974), Puerto Rican baseball player
- Juan Cruz (born 1978), Dominican baseball player
- Luis Cruz (born 1984), American baseball player
- Nelson Cruz (born 1980), baseball outfielder from Monte Cristi, Dominican Republic
- Nelson Cruz (pitcher) (born 1972), baseball pitcher from Puerto Plata, Dominican Republic
- Oneil Cruz (born 1998), Dominican baseball player
- Steven Cruz (born 1999), Dominican baseball player
- Trei Cruz (born 1998), Canadian-Puerto Rican baseball player

==== Volleyball ====
- Áurea Cruz (born 1982), Puerto Rican volleyball player
- Eva Cruz (born 1974), Puerto Rican volleyball player
- Flávio Cruz (born 1982), Portuguese volleyball player
- Jacqueline Cruz Silva (born 1962), Brazilian beach volleyball player

=== As a given name ===
- Cruz Beckham (born 2005), British singer and musician, son of David Beckham
- Cruz Bustamante (born 1953), American politician
- Cruz Hewitt (born 2008), Australian tennis player
- Cruz Martínez Esteruelas (1932–2000), Spanish politician
- Cruz Pérez Cuéllar (born 1969), Mexican politician
- Cruz Reynoso (1932–2021), American civil rights lawyer and jurist
- Cruz Teng (born 1979), Singaporean former radio host

== Fictional characters ==
- Artemio Cruz, protagonist of the novel La muerte de Artemio Cruz by Carlos Fuentes
- Brian Cruz (Tag), a mutant character in Marvel Comics
- Ernesto De La Cruz, the main antagonist of Coco
- Kaylie Cruz, fictional character on the ABC Family series, Make It or Break It
- Maritza Cruz, police sergeant in the television drama Third Watch
- Ramiro "Ram" Cruz, the main protagonist of the games Total Overdose and Chili Con Carnage
- Soma Cruz in the video game Castlevania: Aria of Sorrow
- Sonia Cruz, a character in the Netflix series Grand Army
- Rosa and Jiggy "Baseball" Cruz, characters in the British comic book series MPH
- Jessica Cruz, a Green Lantern from DC Comics.
- Cruz Ramirez, a character in Cars 3
- Cruz, a character in Elena of Avalor

== See also ==
- Cruz (disambiguation), other meanings
- De la Cruz surname page
- Santa Cruz (disambiguation)
- Veracruz (disambiguation)
- Croce
- Cruise (name)
- Cruiser (disambiguation)
- Cruising (disambiguation)
- Cruse (disambiguation)
- Cruze (disambiguation)
- Cruzer
- Kruse (disambiguation)
