= Krus =

Krus or KRUS may refer to:

- Kru people, or Krus, an ethnic group of West Africa
- KRUS, an American radio station
- Kasa Rolniczego Ubezpieczenia Społecznego, the Farmers Social Insurance Fund of Poland
- Marek Kruś (born 1952), Polish hockey player
- Kura Sushi, a Japanese sushi restaurant chain traded under the Nasdaq ticker KRUS

== See also ==
- Kru (disambiguation)
- Kruz (disambiguation)
- Kruse
- Kroos, a surname
- Kroes, a surname
- Kruss (disambiguation)
- Krusz, a village in Poland
- Crus (disambiguation)
