= Cruiser (disambiguation) =

A cruiser is a type of naval warship.

Cruiser may also refer to:

== People ==
- "The Cruiser" nickname of Conor Cruise O'Brien (1917–2008), Irish politician and writer
- A passenger on a cruise ship

== Vehicles ==
=== Air ===
- ATA Cruiser, an American light aircraft of the 1920s
- Spartan Cruiser, a 1930s British six-passenger monoplane

=== Land ===
- Cruiser (motorcycle)
- Cruiser bicycle
- Cruiser tank, a type of tank designed for cavalry or high-speed operations
- Chrysler PT Cruiser, a small passenger car
- Police cruiser, a term for certain police cars
- Toyota Land Cruiser, a sport-utility vehicle

=== Water ===
- Aircraft cruiser, a specific type of naval cruiser
- Armed merchantman (also known as an auxiliary cruiser), a specific type of naval cruiser
- Armored cruiser, a specific type of naval cruiser
- Battlecruiser, a specific type of naval cruiser
- Cabin cruiser, a type of power boat or a UK term for a motorboat designed for inland waters
- Cruiser submarine
- Cruiser yacht, a sailing yacht built for long-distance sailing that allows permanent crew
- Heavy cruiser, a specific type of naval cruiser
- Light cruiser, a specific type of naval cruiser
- MV Cruiser, a charter cruise vessel owned by Clyde Maritime Services, built in 1974
- Protected cruiser, a specific type of naval cruiser
- Scout cruiser, a specific type of naval cruiser
- Torpedo gunboat (also known as a Torpedo cruiser), a specific type of naval cruiser
- Unprotected cruiser, a specific type of naval cruiser

== Arts, entertainment, and media ==
- "Cruiser" (song), a song by The Cars from their 1981 album Shake It Up
- The Cruiser, a novel by Warren Tute
- "The Cruiser (Judgment Day)", a song by Gotthard from their 2007 album Domino Effect

== Other ==
- Cruiser (butterfly), species of the genus Vindula
- Cruiser, a pesticide toxic to bees
- Vodka Cruiser, an alcoholic beverage

== See also ==
- Cruise (disambiguation)
- Cruising (disambiguation)
- Cruizer (disambiguation)
- Cruse (disambiguation)
- Cruz (disambiguation)
- Cruze (disambiguation)
- Cruzer
- Kruse (disambiguation)
