= Holmen Cemetery =

Cemetery in Copenhagen, Denmark

- Holmens Kirkegård
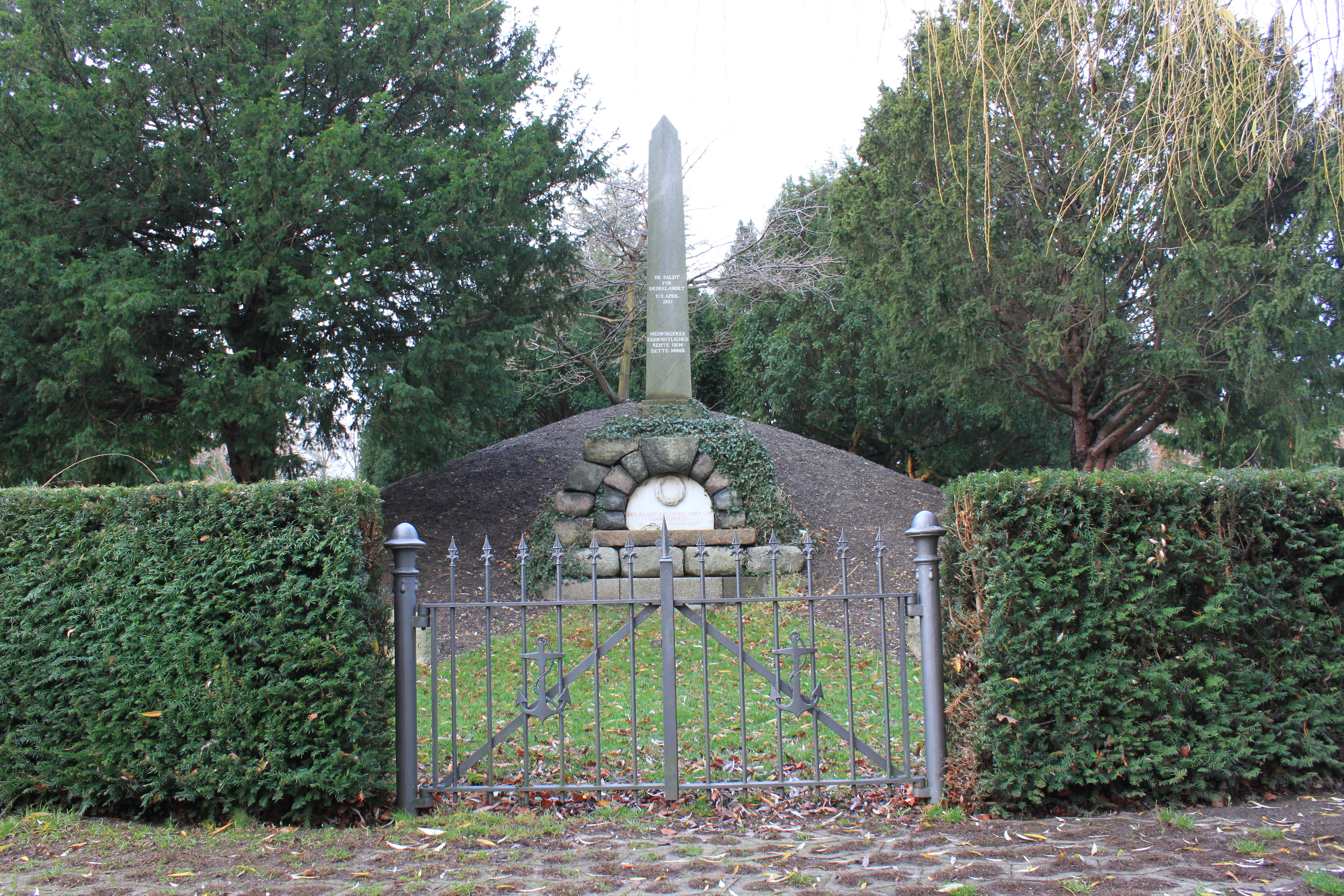
- The Battle of Copenhagen Memorial
- Interactive map of Holmen Cemetery

Details
- Established: 1666
- Location: Østerbro, Copenhagen
- Country: Denmark
- Coordinates: 55°41′36″N 12°34′47″E
- Size: hectares
- Website: Official web site

Holmen Cemetery (Danish: Holmens Kirkegård) is the oldest cemetery still in use in Copenhagen, Denmark. It was first located next to the naval Church of Holmen in the city centre but relocated to its current site on Dag Hammarskjölds Allé in the Østerbro district in 1666. The cemetery originally served as a burial site for indigent sailors in royal service and their families, complementing the military Garnisons Cemetery, from 1711 located on a neighbouring site.

== History ==
When the anchor forge at Bremerholm was converted into a naval church by Christian IV in 1619, a churchyard was laid out next to it. It remained in use until 1651 but was then, following an extension of the church between 1641 and 1649, relocated to a site outside the Bastioned Fortifications, next to the main road leading in and out of the Eastern City Gate. The grounds had already been in use as a cemetery since 1662 but was inaugurated as the new Holmen Cemetery in 1666.

The existing layout of the cemetery was created by sær F. C. Schmidt in 1798.

== Chapel ==
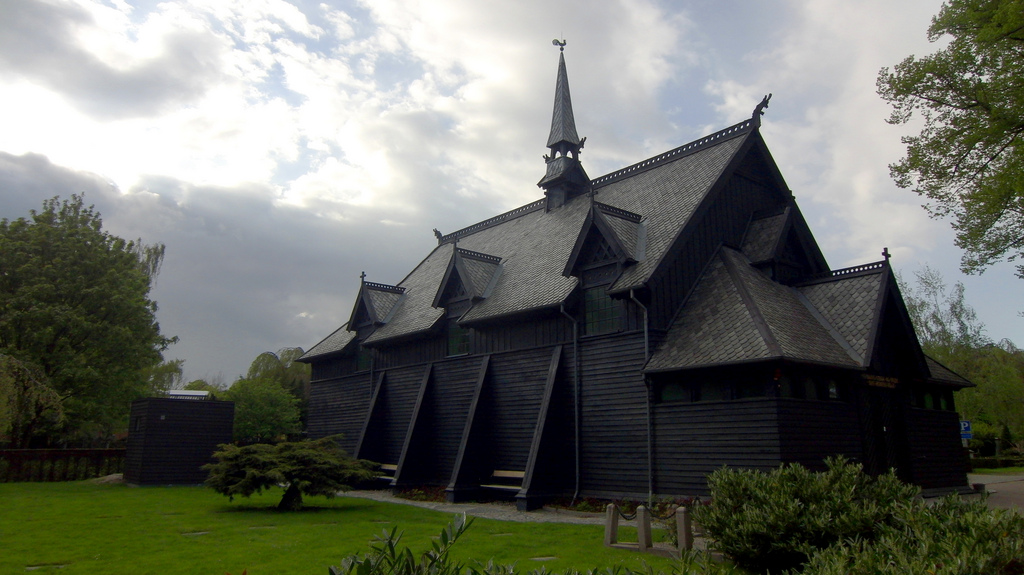
The chapel from 1902

The chapel at Holmen Cemetery was built in 1902 to the design of architect and professor Ludvig Fenger. He favoured the Historicist styles and in Copenhagen he had already designed St. James' Church (1876–1878) in a Gothic Revival style and St. Mathew's Church (1878–1880) in a Romanesque Revival style. In his design of the chapel at Holmen Cemetery he relied on traditional Nordic stave churches for inspiration.

The chapel is an adapted stave church design, lacking the tall, tower-like appearance which is normally seen in such buildings, but the shingled slate roof, the tarred timber and the carved animal heads are characteristic features.

== Battle of Copenhagen memorial ==
There is a memorial for naval personnel killed in the Battle of Copenhagen from 1802. It consists of a tumulus topped by an obelisk designed by Johannes Wiedewelt.

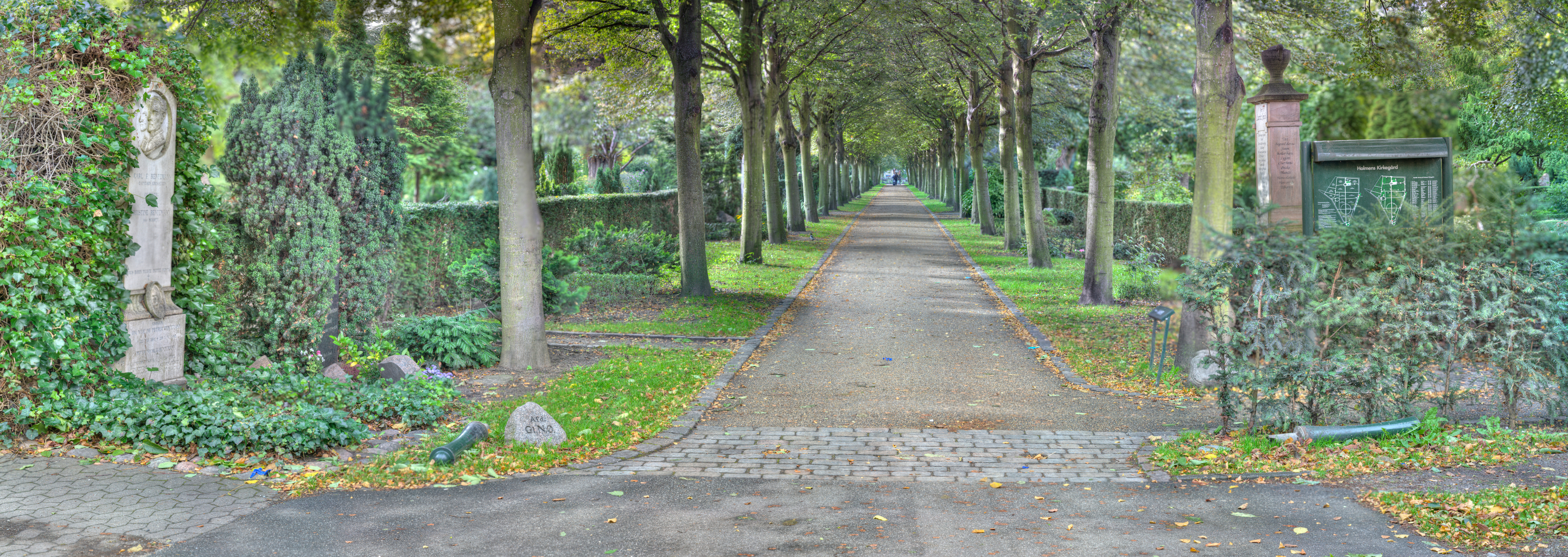
From Holmen Cemetery

== Interments ==
- Nicolai Christian Levin Abrahams
- Freddy Albeck
- Oda Alstrup
- Svend Auken
- Otto Bache
- David Rudolph Bay
- Sigfride Bille
- Steen Andersen Bille
- Steen Andersen Bille
- Carl Heinrich Bloch
- Erling Bloch
- Nic. Blædel
- Ingolf Boisen
- Victor Borregaard
- Fritz Bruzelius
- Philippa Bulgin
- Carl Christian Burmeister
- Emil Bærentzen
- Anthonie Christensen
- Lizzie Corfixen
- Johan Julius Exner
- Allan Fridericia
- Emma Gad
- Edvard Galle
- Tove Grandjean
- Thomasine Gyllembourg
- Anne Mette Haagensen
- Alfred Hage
- Gustav Bartholin Hagen
- Fanny Halstrøm
- Arne Hansen
- Benny Hansen
- Bjørn T. Hansen
- Gunnar "Nu" Hansen
- Heinrich Hansen, painter
- Heinrich Hansen, architect
- Mogens 'Mugge' Hansen
- Robert Hansen
- Emil Hartmann
- Oluf Hartmann
- Thomas Havning
- Peter Heering
- Gunnar Heerup
- Johan Ludvig Heiberg
- Johan Ludvig Heiberg
- Johanne Luise Heiberg
- Peter Heise
- Frederik Ferdinand Helsted
- Gerhard Henning
- Stefan Henszelman
- F. Hertzog
- Johannes Hohlenberg
- Hakon Holm
- H. P. Holst
- Knud Høgenhaven
- Johan Christian Islef
- Kristine Marie Jensen
- Emil Jeppesen
- Ove Jørgensen
- Niels-Jørgen Kaiser
- Thorvald Kierkegaard
- Jørgen-Bent Kistorp
- Frits Hammer Kjølsen
- Fritz Koch
- Julius Koppel
- Eyvind Kornbeck
- Peter Kornbeck
- A. F. Krieger
- Torben Krogh
- Frederik Vinding Kruse
- Albert Køie-Nielsen
- Harald Lander
- Sven Lange
- Rued Langgaard
- Helge Larsen
- Hugo Larsen
- Robert Leepin
- Orla Lehmann
- Per Linnemann-Schmidt
- Mogens Lorentzen
- Carl Lumbye
- Georg Lumbye
- H. C. Lumbye
- Tippe Lumbye
- Emil Lund
- J. L. Lund
- Karen Lykkehus
- Jørgen Læssøe
- Oscar Matthiesen
- Vilhelm Melbye
- Anton Michelsen
- Randi Michelsen
- Nils Middelboe
- Ida Møller
- Balthasar Münter
- Holger Munk
- Dea Trier Mørch
- Gert Nielsen
- Hans-Jørgen Nielsen
- Lars Nordskov Nielsen
- Helge Nissen
- Julius Paulsen
- Kjeld Petersen
- Theodor Philipsen
- Louise Phister
- Ludvig Phister
- Andreas du Plessis de Richelieu
- Gurli Plesner
- Elsebeth Reingaard
- Elli Rex
- Sven Risom
- Lise Roos
- P. Rostrup Bøyesen
- Thorkild Rovsing
- Paul V. Rubow
- Henrik Rung
- Johan Christian Ryge
- Martinus Rørbye
- Sally Salminen
- Harald Sandbæk
- Frank Schaufuss
- Poul Schierbeck
- Sylvia Schierbeck
- Valdemar Schiøtt
- C. A. Schleisner
- Axel Schou
- H. S. Sibbern
- Agnes Slott-Møller
- Harald Slott-Møller
- Jørgen Sonne
- Carl Nicolai Starcke
- Viggo Starcke
- Jørgen Stegelmann
- Theobald Stein
- Edouard Suenson
- Mustapha 'Manuel' Tafat
- Lotte Tarp
- Sv. Erik Tarp
- Rosita Thomas
- Oskar Thyregod
- Rose Thyregod
- Jens Peter Trap
- Fanny Tuxen
- Agnete Vøhtz
- William Wain
- Christian Winther
- Ebba With
- Jens Jacob Asmussen Worsaae
- Mogens Wöldike
- Aase Ziegler
- Lise Østergaard
- C. F. Aagaard

== See also ==
- Parks and open spaces in Copenhagen
