= Kruz =

Kruz or KRUZ may refer to:

== People ==
- Alex Kruz, American actor
- Josef Kruz, Czech sports shooter

== Radio stations ==
- KRUZ (FM), a radio station (103.3 FM) licensed to serve Santa Barbara, California
- KVYB, a radio station (106.3 FM) licensed to serve Oak View, California, United States, which held the call sign KRUZ from 2017 to 2019
- KJJC (AM), a radio station (1230 AM) licensed to serve Murray, Utah, United States, which held the call sign KRUZ from 2015 to 2017
- KJQS, a defunct radio station (1060 AM) formerly licensed to serve Van Buren, Arkansas, United States, which held the call sign KRUZ from 2012 to 2015
- KLSB, a radio station (97.5 FM) licensed to serve Goleta, California, United States, which held the call sign KRUZ or KRUZ-FM from 2005 to 2012
- CKRU-FM, a radio station (100.5 FM) licensed to serve Peterborough, Ontario, Canada, formerly branded as 100.5 Kruz FM from 2010 to 2014

== See also ==
- Cruz (disambiguation)
- Krus (disambiguation)
- Kruse
- Kroos, a surname
