= Cruze =

Cruze may refer to:

== People ==
- James Cruze (1884–1942), silent film actor and film director
- Chester Cruze (born c. 1939), a former member of the Ohio House of Representatives
- Buddy Cruze (1933–2018), American football player
- Rachel Cruze (born 1988), American personal finance author
- TD Cruze, American music producer
- Cruze Ah-Nau (born 1990), Australian rugby union footballer

== Transportation ==
- Chevrolet Cruze, a compact car produced by General Motors
- Suzuki Ignis, also sold as the Chevrolet Cruze and Holden Cruze
- Corsair Cruze 970, a sailboat

== See also ==
- Rupert D'Cruze, British conductor
- Cruz, a surname
- Cruz (disambiguation)
- Cruse (disambiguation)
- Cruise (disambiguation)
- Kruse (disambiguation)
