= Cruise =

Cruise or Cruises may also refer to:

== Tourism ==
- Cruise, any travel on a cruise ship
- Booze cruise
- Music cruise
- River cruise

== Aeronautics and aircraft ==
- Cruise (aeronautics), a distinct stage of an aircraft's flight
- Aviasouz Cruise, a Russian ultralight trike design

== Automotive ==
- Cruising (driving), roaming or a social gathering
- Cruise (autonomous vehicle), now GM Cruise LLC, a subsidiary of General Motors developing autonomous cars
- Cruise control

== Films ==
- The Cruise (1970 film), the English title of the Polish film Rejs
- The Cruise (1998 film), an American documentary
- Cruise (film), a 2018 romantic comedy film

== Geography ==
- Cruise, Kentucky, a community in the United States
- Cruises Creek, a stream in Kentucky

== Music ==
- Cruise (band), a rock band from the former Soviet Union
- Cruise (Akina Nakamori album), 1989
- Cruise (Whitehouse album), 2001
- "Cruise", a song by David Gilmour from About Face (1984)
- "Cruise" (song), a 2012 song by Florida Georgia Line

== Radio and television ==
- Gold 1323, formerly Cruise 1323, a radio station in Adelaide, Australia
- The Cruise (1998 TV series), a 1998 British fly-on-the-wall documentary series set on the Galaxy cruise ship that aired on BBC One
- The Cruise (2016 TV series), a British reality television series set on the Regal Princess cruise ship that has aired on ITV since 2016
- "The Cruise" (Brooklyn Nine-Nine), a 2016 television episode
- "The Cruise" (Don't Wait Up), a 1985 television episode

== Other uses ==
- Cruise collection, an inter-season line of clothing
- Cruise (name), a surname of English origin (includes a list of people named Cruise)
- Cruise missile

== See also ==
- Cruiser (disambiguation)
- Cruising (disambiguation)
- Cruse (disambiguation)
- Cruz (disambiguation)
- Cruze (disambiguation)
- Cruzer
- Kruse (disambiguation)
- The Love Boat
