= Cruz family =

Cruz family may refer to:

- Cruz family (Chile), founded by Giovanni della Croce Bernadotte in 1743
- Cruz family (Philippines), a Filipino family of entertainers

== See also ==
- Cruz, a surname
