= Cruse (surname) =

Cruse is a surname of English origin.

There are many variant spellings, including Crewes, Crewis, Crews, Cruce, Cruise, Cruize, Crus, Cruwys, De Cruce and De Cruze.

== People ==
- Bruce Cruse (born 1967), Australian cricketer
- Cindy Cruse-Ratcliff (born Cindy Cruse in 1963), singer-songwriter and the Director of Lakewood Church in Houston, Texas, United States
- Colin Cruse (born 1951), former Australian rules footballer
- Emmanuel Cruse (born 1968), French winemaker, a member of the Cruse family (see below)
- Harold Cruse (1916–2005), social critic and teacher of African-American studies
- Heloise Bowles Cruse (1919–1977), original author of the popular American syndicated newspaper column "Hints from Heloise"
- Hieronymous Cruse (Jeronimus Croase) (died 1687), a soldier and explorer for the Dutch East India Company in South Africa
- Howard Cruse (1944–2019), American cartoonist
- Howard Cruse (bishop) (1908–1979), Anglican Bishop of Knaresborough from 1965 to 1972
- Jack Cruise (1915–1979), Irish comedian & actor
- Thomas Cruse (1857–1943), United States Army brigadier general awarded the Medal of Honor
- Vicki Cruse (1967–2009), American aerobatic pilot and administrator
- Cruse family, a family of Protestant winemakers from the Bordeaux region of France

== Fictional characters ==
- Matt Cruse, the main character and narrator in the Airborn novel series written by Kenneth Oppel

== See also ==
- Cruise (name)
- Cruse (disambiguation)
