= Cruwys =

Cruwys /ˈkruːz/ is a surname which today is mainly found in America, Australia, Canada, England, Ireland and Wales. It is a variant form of Cruse; there are many others.

== Notable people with this surname ==
- Jill Cruwys (1943–1990), England cricketer
- Margaret Cruwys (1894–1968), Devon historian
- Robert Cruwys (1884–1951), cricketer

== Fictional characters ==
- Cruwys Morchard, the alias of Clytie Potts in the 2006 novel A Darkling Plain

== See also ==
- Cruwys (disambiguation), other meanings including places with this word in the name
