= Kurru =

Kurru may refer to:

In Australian Aboriginal languages:

- -kurru, an allative suffix in the Wanyi language

In Ancient Nubia:

- El-Kurru, a cemetery used by the Nubian royal family.

In South India:

- Kurru or Kurru basha an alternate name for the Yerukala language
- Kurrus, an alternate name for the Yerukala people

In Thailand:

- the old form of Kru, a Thai language honorific for:
  - an instructor or master teacher of Muay Thai
  - teachers at primary/elementary and kindergarten/preschool level

== See also ==
- Kuru (disambiguation)
- Kru (disambiguation)
