= Kro =

Kro or KRO may refer to:

- Katholieke Radio Omroep, Dutch public broadcasting organization
- Kro (character), character from the Marvel Comics, also known as Warlord Kro
- IATA code for Kurgan Airport
- ISO code for Kru languages

== See also ==
- Cro (disambiguation)
- Kru (disambiguation)
