= Rosengården 13 =

Listed buildings in Copenhagen

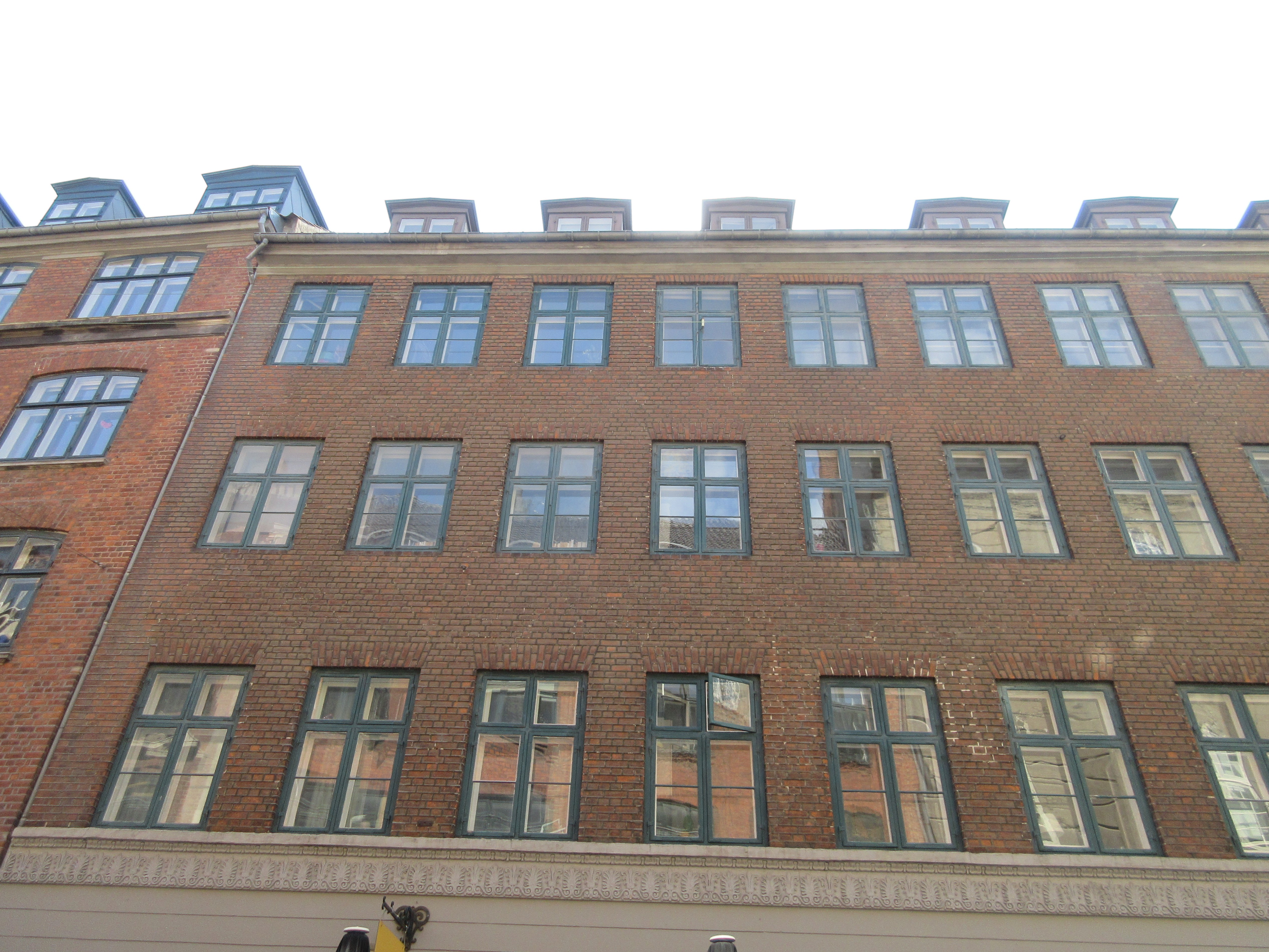

General information
- Location: Copenhagen, Denmark
- Coordinates: 55°40′56.06″N 12°34′21.11″E
- Completed: 1842

Rosengården 13 is a mid 19th-century property situated in the street Rosengården, between Kultorvet and the shopping street Strøget, in the Old Town of Copenhagen, Denmark. The building was listed in the Danish registry of protected buildings and places in 1964. The neighboring building at Rosengården 5 was also constructed for Culmsee.

== History ==
=== 18th century ===
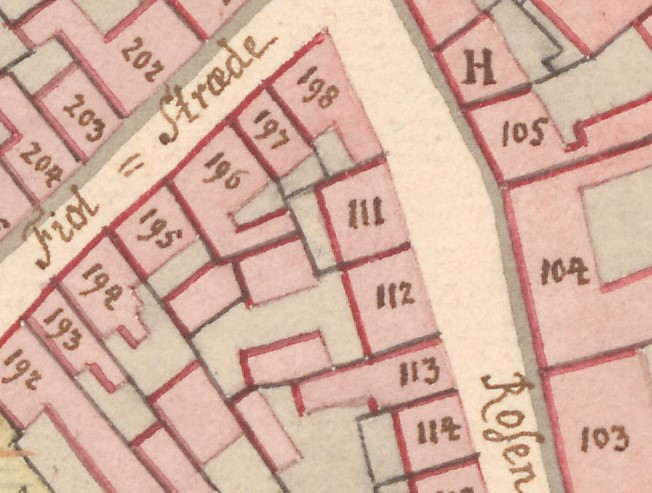
No. 111 and No. 112 seen on a detail from Christian Gedde's map of Klædebo Quarter, 1757.

The site was formerly part of two smaller properties. The western property was listed in Copenhagen's new cadastre of 1756 as No. 111 in Klædebo Quarter, owned by carpenter Johan Christian. The eastern property was listed as No. 112, owned by distiller Christen Larsen.

No. 111 was home to 17 residents in four households at the 1801 census. Mathias Hagstrøm, a candlemaker, resided in the building with his wife Anne Sophie Brandt and her sister Christen Hiølund. Herman Raso, a baker, resided in the building with Anne Marie Skouboe. Brinjolver Johnsen, a gardener, resided in the building with his wife Anne Margrethe Johnsen, six poor people and a child from Fødselsstiftelsen. Johan Conrad Post, a cooper (boksersvend), resided in the building with his wife Concordia Post and their one-year-old daughter. No. 112 was home to 43 residents in seven households. Johan Madsen Schmidt, a distiller, resided in the building with his wife Dorthea Cathrine Schmidt, their two daughters (aged nine and 12), two brewery workers, a widow and her son, two maids and three lodgers. Christen Pedersen Krag, a flax hamerer (hørsvinger), resided in the building with his wife Inger Christine Krag and their 11-year-old son.

Christopher Olsen, a watchman, resided in the building with his wife Christiania Olsen, a widow and the widow's daughter.[8]

The old No. 112 was listed in the new cadastre of 1801 as No. 121 in Klædebo Quarter, owned by distiller Johannes Schmid. The old No. 111 was listed as No. 122, owned by Jens Peter Brøgger.

=== N. P. Cadovius and the new building ===
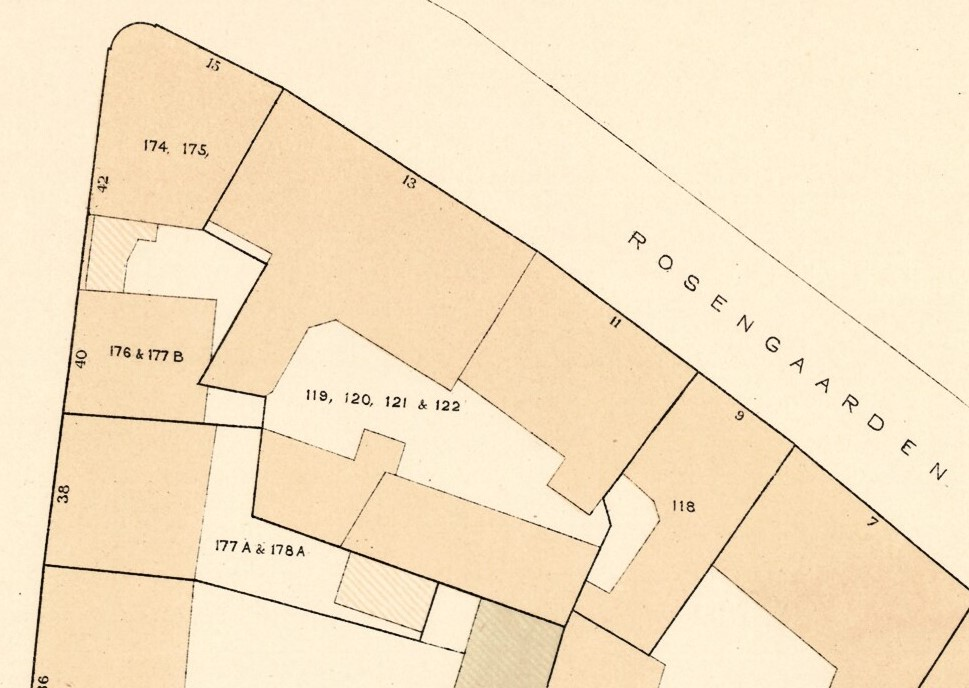
Rosengården 11-13 seen on one of Berggreen's block plans of Klædebo Quarter, 1886–88. Notice the two now demolished side wings.

In 1830, No. 121 and No. 122 were merged into a single property as No. 121 & 122. The property was at some point acquired by distiller Nicolay Peter Cadovius. He resided in the building with his four children (aged three to 25), three male employees and two maids at the time of the 1740 census.

Lars Rasmussen, a barkeeper, resided in the adjacent building No. 123+125 )now Rogengården 11) with his wife Anna Sophie Espens, their 16-year-old son and three workmen.

The present building on the site was constructed for Cadovius in 1841–42.

The property was home to 43 residents in seven households at the 1845 census. Nicolay Peter Cadovius, a distiller, resided on the ground floor with his wife Dorthea Cathrine Winther, their five children (eight to 23) and six male employees. Thrine Bryndum, the widow of a grocer (høker), resided in one of the first-floor apartments with her eight-year-old son, one maid and two lodgers. Laura Overby, a widow with a pension, resided in the other first-floor apartment with the widow Ane Christine Staustrup, one maid and one lodger. Hans Dalberg, a kammerassessor at Maleværket, resided in one of the second-floor apartments with his wife Emilie Christine Dahlberg, their five children (aged seven to 12) and two maids. Jørgen Thor Teblelev, a retired civil servant, resided in one of the second-floor apartments with his Oline Frederikke Teblelev, one maid and two lodgers. Christian Engelhart, a bank assistant, resided in one of the third-floor apartments with his wife Natalie f. Rønne, one maid and one lodger. Marie Laura Holmblad, Marie Elisabeth Funck and Herigood Grümer—three unmarried women—shared the other third-floor apartment.

In 1850, Cadovius also constructed the neighboring building at Rosengården 11 (then No. 123).

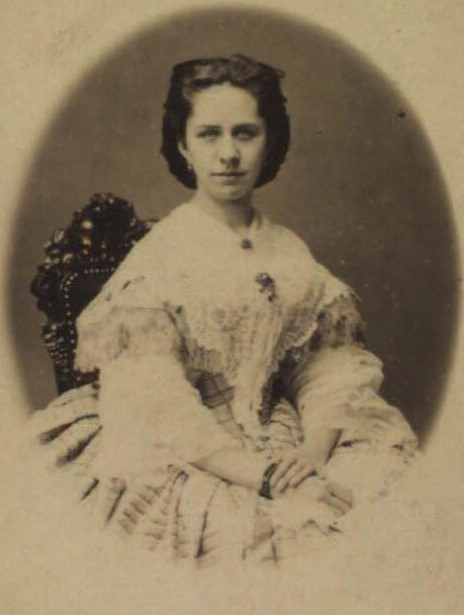
Actress Camilla Lerche

Cadovius was still the owner of the building at the time of the 1860 census. His property was home to 39 residents in seven households at the 1860 census. Nicolai Peter Cadovius resided on the ground floor with three unmarried daughters (aged 23 to 30), a huskomfru, two maids, four male employees and two lodgers. Ove Malling, a high-ranking civil servant in the Ministry of Interior Affairs, resided on the first floor with his wife Betzy Andrea Marie Malling (née Sletting), their two children (aged three and five) and two maids. Ane Elisabeth Engelsen, a widow, resided on the first floor with Consalinde at Roskilde Abbey Ane Elisabeth Engelsen and lodger Jens Christian Mørck (engineer). Johan Peder Lerche, a jeweller, resided on the second floor to the left with his wife Marie Lerche, their two children (aged 19 and 22) and one maid. The daughter Camilla Lerche was an actress. Eduard Smidt, a captain in the King's Lige Guard Corps, resided in the other second-floor apartment with his wife Louise Smidt, their 11-year-old daughter Abigael Smidt and one maid. Hansine Anna Winge (née Lange), widow of a konferensråd (daughter of postmaster-general Christian Wilhelm Lange), resided in one of the third-floor apartments with one maid. Arnbjøt Olafsson, a cand-phil. and member of the Icelandic Althing, resided in the other second-floor apartment with his wife Ovine Frederikke Dorthea Sebbelev, the widow Amalie Christiane Bakke, one maid and one lodger.

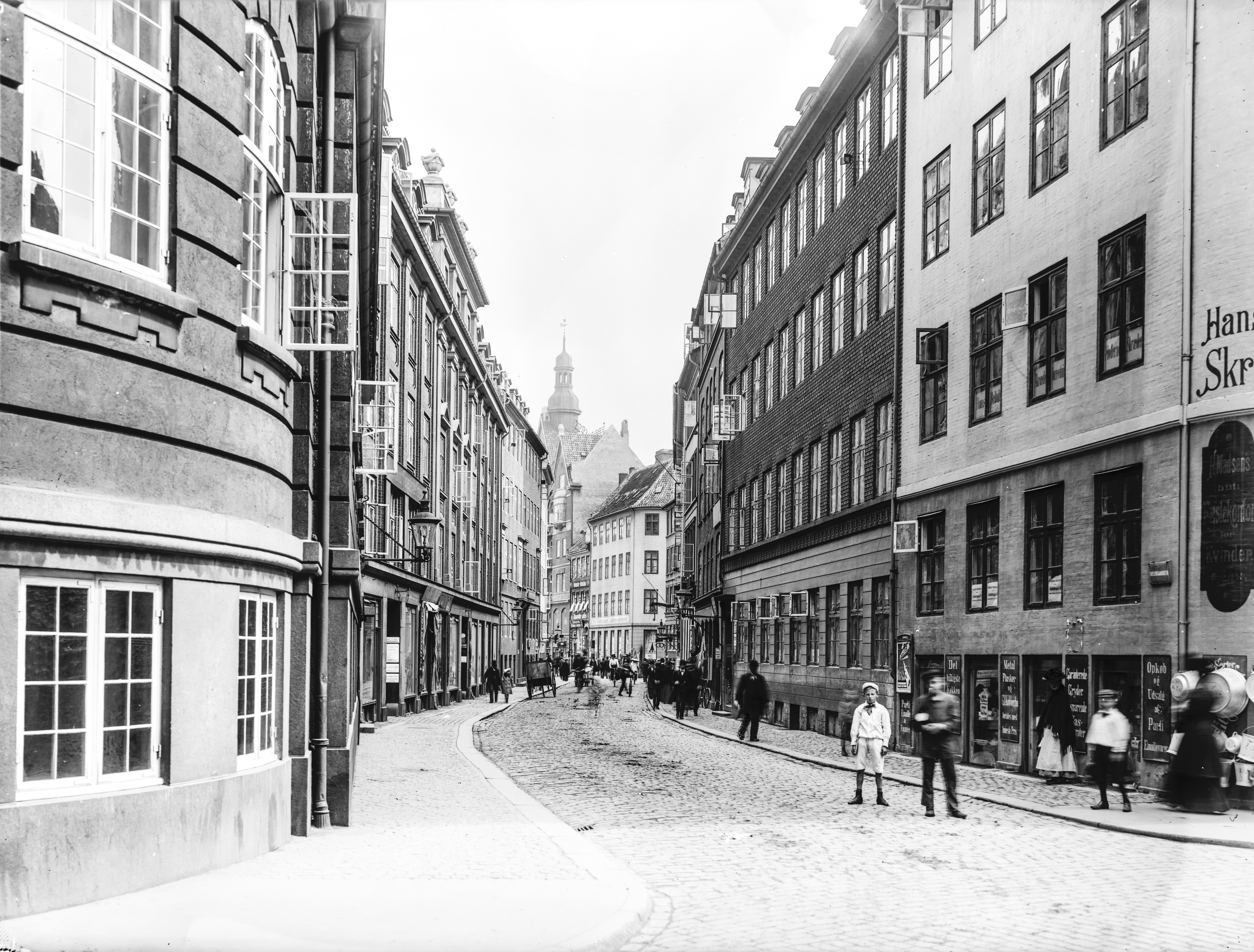
The building visible to the right on a photograph by Johannes Hauerslev.

The naval officer Elias Tuxen and the author Fanny Tuxen myst have taken over one of the apartments later the same year. Their daughter Harriet was thus born in the building in 1860.

=== 20th century ===
C. A. Christensen's Eftf., a wholesale company dealing in silver and gold articles, was based in the building in 1950. The firm was founded in 1870 by C. A. Christensen.

== Architure ==
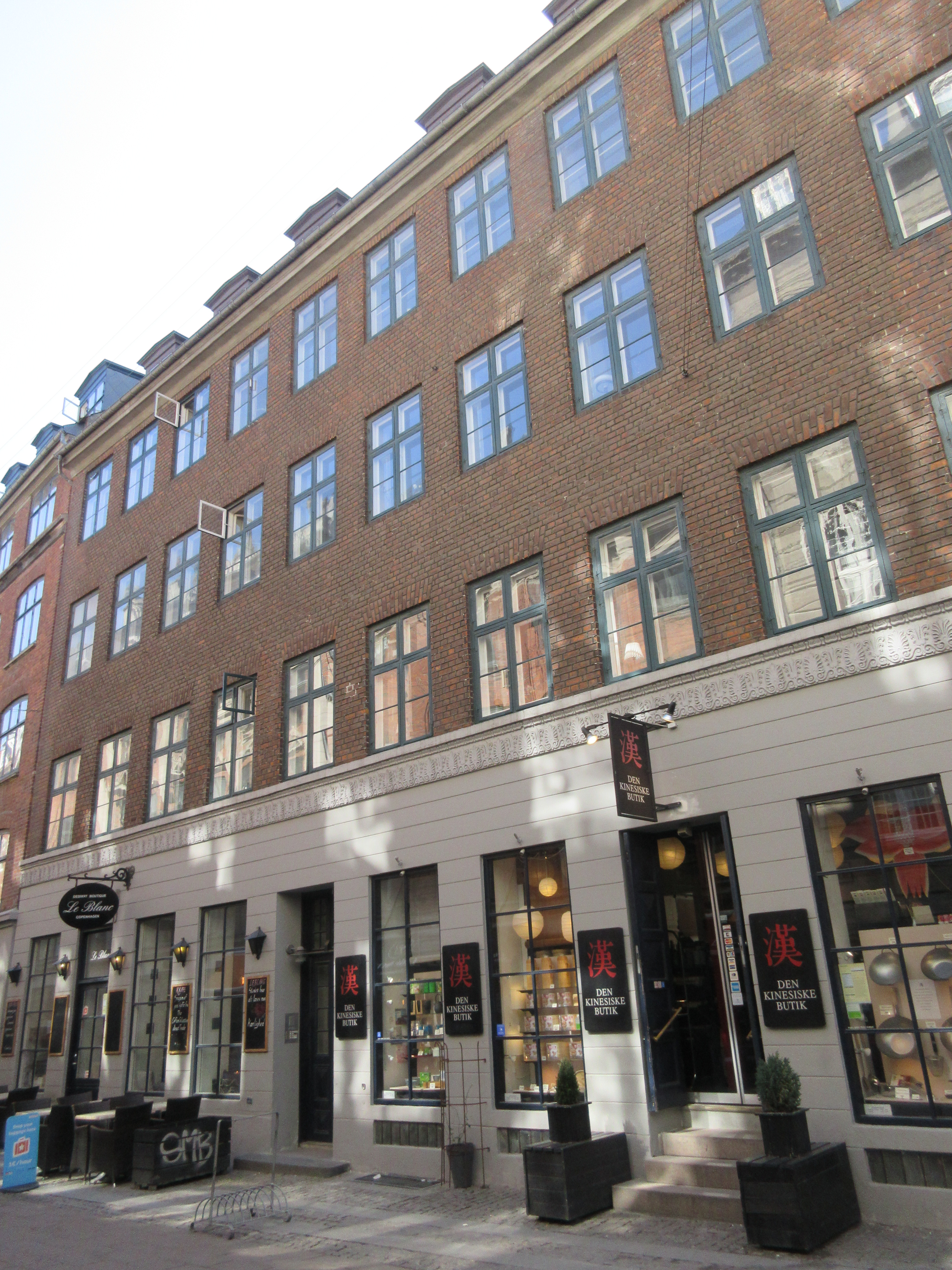
Rosengården 13.

Rosengården 13 is constructed with four storeys over a walk-out basement. The ten-bays wide facade is plastered and grey. Most of the rear wing was demolished in 1976 to create a large courtyard in the centre of the vlock.

== Todau ==
The ground floor of the building houses a restaurant. Two residential apartments are located on each of the upper floors.
