= Reading Youth Orchestra =

Reading Youth Orchestra (RYO) is one of the oldest youth orchestras in the United Kingdom. It was formed in 1944 with just eleven members and has a history rooted strongly in the British Youth and Community Service. It is open to all young people in the general area of Reading in the English county of Berkshire; admission is by audition. The orchestra, whose members range from fourteen to nineteen years of age, meets on Friday evenings to prepare for its three annual concerts. The orchestra celebrated its 60th birthday in 2004.

RYO has toured to European cities and regularly holds summer courses.

Reading Youth Orchestra is supported by Friends of RYO (FRYO).

== History (1944–1954) ==
Reading Youth Orchestra was founded in 1944, after the Youth Committee of the time had begun instrumental lessons for modest fees (sixpence, or 2.5p today). The conductor was Humphrey Hare, senior science master at Leighton Park and amateur musician. It had its first rehearsal on 29 October 1944, with 11 players, many of whom could not even read music. This number slowly increased, fed by pupils from Leighton Park and Kendrick Schools, and some of the teachers playing along.

In March 1945, the orchestra made its debut in a small-scale concert playing simple pieces like Handel's Scipio. On 16 November 1945, the orchestra performed for the first time movements from major works in a joint concert with Reading Youth Choir. The programme included Strauss' Blue Danube waltz.

In 1947, RYO went on their first tour to Zaandam in the Netherlands.

The concert of February 1948 saw the premiere of a Fugue specially composed for, and dedicated to Reading Youth Orchestra by Humphrey Hare. This fugue is featured on one of the 78 RPM records recorded on 23 May at Leighton Park.

On 8 August 1949, the now sixty strong orchestra went to Düsseldorf for a week's visit during which they gave four concerts, which were very much appreciated by local people who came to see them.

The fifth anniversary concert in March 1950 marked the five years since the first concert in March 1945.

In August 1950, RYO toured again to Germany. The cost to members was £13.00. Five concerts were given, finishing with a return visit to Düsseldorf.

The tour to Denmark in August 1951 was organised by RYO's new conductor, Mark Wigram, at the Invitation of the World Friendship Association. The orchestra travelled as two separate parties. One travelled by air and had five days in Denmark before the other party arrived. The other party travelled by sea and stayed on a further five days after the air party had left. In addition to the usual sight seeing program, which included the Carlsberg breweries. The orchestra gave three concerts. The second concert was notable because part of it was broadcast on Danish National Radio. The final concert of the tour was given in the concert hall of the Tivoli Gardens in Copenhagen.

Mark Wigram's last concert with RYO, in February 1952, included the first public performance of Serenade (for small orchestra) by Richard Bennett, now Richard Rodney Bennett, who played in the percussion section of the orchestra. In 1959, at the age of 23, Bennett also composed an overture that was dedicated to Reading Youth Orchestra. This remained unplayed for many years in its full orchestral form, although it received its first public performance as part of the fiftieth anniversary celebrations in 1994.

The concert given in June 1953 celebrated the Coronation of Her Majesty Queen Elizabeth II.

The tenth anniversary concert, conducted by John Russell, was held in the town hall on Friday, 16 July 1954. During the concert, Gwynneth Reed was presented with a bouquet of flowers and later a brooch after six years with the orchestra. Following the tenth anniversary concert, John Russell handed over the baton to Edward Underhill who had been deputy conductor since the early years of the orchestra's life.

== Conductors ==
- 1944–1949 Humphrey Hare
- 1950–1952 Mark Wigram
- 1952–1954 John Russell
- 1954–1974 Edward Underhill
- 1974–1976 Roy Goodman
- 1976–1997 Robert Roscoe
- 1997–2000 Rupert D'Cruze
- 2000–2006 Christopher Walker
- 2006–2020 Paul Cox
- 2020– Mel Le Breuilly

== Leaders ==
Sources:

- 1948–1954 Gwynneth Reed
- 1954–1955 David Gribble
- 1955–1957 Margaret Martin
- 1957–1960 Vivienne Martin
- 1960–1962 Ronald Colyer
- 1962–1966 Susan Armitage
- 1966–1969 Stephen Lustig
- 1969–1970 John Berridge
- 1970–1972 Jane Chrzanowska
- 1972–1973 Penelope Gouk
- 1973–1977 Rosemary Seward
- 1977–1979 Colin Albery
- 1979–1981 Karen Fawcett
- 1981–1982 Edward Morton
- 1982–1983 Rebecca Richardson
- 1983–1985 Sarah Ewins
- 1985–1986 Patrick Evans
- 1986–1987 Hannah Lynch
- 1987–1989 Philip Montgomery-Smith
- 1989–1990 Guy Haskell
- 1990–1991 Laura Dudeney
- 1991–1993 Richard Briggs
- 1993–1995 Hannah Rowley
- 1995–1996 Catherine Offord
- 1996–1997 Hui Hui Ng
- 1997–1998 Emma Gostling
- 1998–1999 Rachel Rowntree
- 1999–2000 Nick Sexton
- 2000–2001 Biddy McClure
- 2001 Nathalie Dudman
- 2001–2004 Tim Hawken
- 2004–2005 Lucy Deeks
- 2005–2006 Arangan Nagendran
- 2006–2008 Lauren Willis
- 2008–2009 Laurence Beveridge
- 2009–2017 Rachel Newman
- 2018–2021 Euon Mallett

== Notable alumni ==
- Richard Rodney Bennett, composer
- Robin Lustig, journalist
- Pip Eastop, French horn player
- Elspeth Dutch, French horn player

== See also ==
- List of youth orchestras
