= Cruisin' =

Cruisin' may refer to:

== Music ==
- Cruisin' (Village People album), 1978
- Cruisin' (Junko Onishi album), 1993
- "Cruisin'" (Smokey Robinson song), 1979, covered by D'Angelo and by Huey Lewis and Gwyneth Paltrow
- "Cruisin'" (Michael Nesmith song), 1979
- "Cruisin'" (Earth, Wind & Fire song), 1996
- "Cruisin'", a 1957 song by Gene Vincent & His Blue Caps
- "Cruisin'", a 2003 song by Sioen
- Cruisin' Classics, a Dutch Shell music compilation

== Video games ==
- Cruis'n, a racing video game series
- City Connection, also known as Cruisin', a 1985 arcade game
- Cruisin', a difficulty level in the video game Elite Beat Agents

== See also ==
- Cruising (disambiguation)
- Cruisin' (sampler series), a pop music sampler series that covered the years 1955–1970
