= Karin Apollonia Müller =

German artist (born 1963)

- Born: 1963 (age 62–63)
- Known for: Fine art photography
- Website: karinapolloniamueller.com

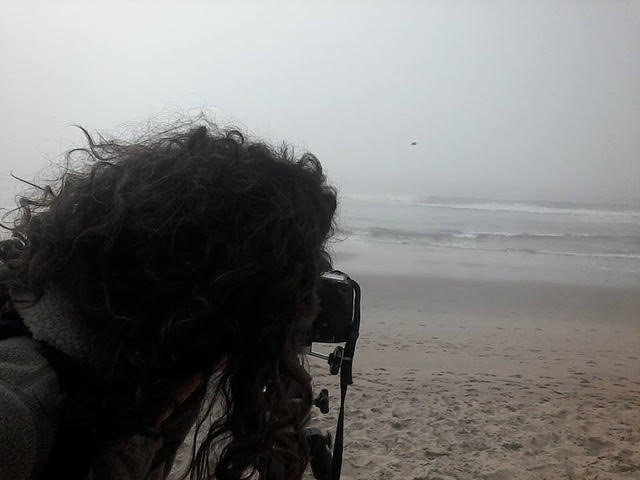
Karin Apollonia Müller photographing at the beach (2020)

Karin Apollonia Müller (born 1963, Heidelberg, Germany) is a German contemporary photographer artist. She has received numerous awards, grants and fellowships. Her work is published, exhibited and is in the following collections: The Whitney Museum of American Art, Museum of Modern Art - New York, Armand Hammer Museum of Art, Los Angeles County Museum of Art among others.

== Collections ==
- Whitney Museum of American Art, New York, NY USA
- Museum of Modern Art, New York, NY USA
- San Francisco Museum of Modern Art, San Francisco, CA, USA
- New School, New York, NY USA
- New York Library, New York, NY USA
- Armand Hammer Museum of Art, Los Angeles, CA USA
- Los Angeles County Museum of Art, CA USA
- Photography Museum of San Francisco, San Francisco, CA USA
- Nevada Art Museum, Reno, NV USA
- Allen Memorial Art Museum, Oberlin, OH USA
- Institut für Auslandsangelegenheiten, Berlin, Deutschland
- FRAC centre, Paris, Frankreich
- Soho House, London, GB

== Awards ==
- 1995 DAAD Fellowship, Los Angeles, USA and American Samoa, Polynesia
- 1996 Villa Aurora, Pacific Palisades, CA USA
- 2000 Lannan Foundation Residency Program, Galisteo, NM, USA
- 2001 The J. Paul Getty/CalArts Commission, Los Angeles, CA, USA
- 2006 Residency Program at Lijiang Studios, Lijiang, Yunnan, China
- 2015 Residency Program Bangalore, India, Goethe Institut
- 2016 Omne Residency, Castelfranco, Italy

== Exhibitions ==
- 2020 Far Out, Citylights; Nevada Museum of Art, Reno, Nevada, USA
- 2019 Properties of human beings; Kunstwerden, Essen, Deutschland
- 2014 World’s Edge; Armory Center for the Arts, Pasadena, CA, USA
- 2014 Far Out; Google Headquarter, Los Angeles, USA
- 2013 Far Out; Diane Rosenstein Fine Art, Los Angeles, USA
- 2012 Gate; Julie Saul Gallery, New York, USA
- 2007 On Edge; Karyn Lovegrove Gallery, Los Angeles, USA
- 2005 Bunkerscapes; Van der Grinten Galerie, Köln, Germany
- 2004 Terra Cognita; Julie Saul Gallery, New York, USA
- 2003 Angels in Fall; Van der Grinten Galerie, Köln, Germany
- 2002 Bunkerscapes; Karyn Lovegrove Gallery, Los Angeles, USA
- 2001 Angels in Fall; Karyn Lovegrove Gallery, Los Angeles, USA
- 2000 Angels in Fall; Julie Saul Gallery, New York, USA
- 2000 Angels in Fall; Photographers Gallery, London, UK
- 1999 Silent summer; Craig Krull Gallery, Santa Monica, USA
- 1999 Angels in Fall; University of Iowa, Iowa, USA
- 1998 Angels in Fall; DG Galerie, München, Germany
- 1998 Angels in Fall; Stephen Cohen Gallery, Los Angeles, USA
- 1997 Angels in Fall; Sam Francis Gallery/Santa Monica, CA, USA in cooperation with Getty Museum L.A., Exiles and Emigres

== Books ==
- Müller, Karin Apollonia (2001). Angles in Fall. Kruse. ISBN 978-3934923096.
- Müller, Karin Apollonia (2009). On Edge. Nazraeli Press. ISBN 9781590052396.
- Müller, Karin Apollonia (2012). Timbercove - Volume 5 in Six by Six. Nazraeli Press. ISBN 9781590053416.
- Müller, Karin Apollonia (2013). Gate - Self Published in an Edition of 10.
