= Cruwys (disambiguation) =

Cruwys may refer to:

== People ==
- Cruwys, list of people with this surname

== Places ==
- Cruwys Morchard, a parish in Mid Devon Local authority area, England, which takes its name from the Cruwys family
- Anstey Cruwys, the old name for East Anstey, a village and parish in Devon, England, which was formerly held by the Cruwys family
