= Tuxen =

Tuxen is a Danish and Norwegian surname. Notable people with the surname include:

- Anne Vilde Tuxen (born 1998), Norwegian diver
- Erik Tuxen (1902–1957), Danish conductor
- Fanny Tuxen (1832–1906), Danish writer
- Helle Tuxen (born 2001), Norwegian diver
- Laurits Tuxen (1853–1927), Danish painter
- Nicoline Tuxen (1847–1931), Danish painter
- Saxil Tuxen (1885–1975), Australian town planner

== See also ==
- Cape Tuxen
