= Cruise (name) =

- Pronunciation: (/kruːz/)
- Language: English

Origin
- Language: Anglo-Norman
- Origin: Old English
- Derivation: derived from crus or cruse
- Meaning: "brave" or "fierce"
- Region of origin: Ireland England

Other names
- Variant forms: Cruse, Cruwys, Cruize, Cruice

Cruise (/kruːz/) is an Anglo-Norman surname which originated in England during Norman Conquest. It is a variant form of Cruce, Cruys, Cruse; others include Cruwys (Welsh) and Cruize. The surname Cruise was found in Bedfordshire (Old English: Bedanfordscir), located in Southeast-central England, formerly part of the Anglo-Saxon kingdom of Mercia.

In Ireland, Cruise is an old surname of Anglo-Norman origin which has been present there since the Anglo-Norman invasion in 1169. The family held lands in Counties Dublin and Meath. In early records the name is mostly spelled de Cruys/Cruys, and sometimes Cruce or Crues, but the spelling evolved to Cruise, and this is now the predominant spelling of the surname in Ireland today. Some time before 1176 Augustino de Cruce witnessed a grant by Strongbow of land in Dublin, and this is the earliest reference to the surname in Ireland found to date.

== Frequency and distribution ==
- Most prevalent in:
  United States with 4,682 people.
- Highest density in:
  Republic of Ireland 506 people (a frequency of 1:9,306) and 1,280th most common surname.

== People with the surname Cruise ==
- Alana Cruise (1981–2025), American pornographic actress
- Conor Cruise O'Brien (1917–2008), Irish politician
- Jack Cruise (1915–1979), Irish comedian and actor
- Julee Cruise (1956–2022), American singer
- Mike Cruise (1947–2026), British astronomer
- Thomas Cruise (born 1991), English footballer
- Tom Cruise (born 1962), American actor and film producer ('Cruise' being his middle name.)

== See also ==
- Cruse (surname)
- Cruz, Spanish surname with the same sound but unrelated, meaning "cross"
