= Robert Cruwys =

English cricketer and clergyman

Personal information
- Full name: Robert Geoffrey Cruwys
- Born: 10 March 1884; Cruwys Morchard House, Devon, England
- Died: 25 August 1951 (aged 67); Cruwys Morchard, Devon, England
- Batting: Right-handed
- Bowling: Wicket-keeper
- Relatives: Margaret Cruwys (sister-in-law)

Domestic team information
- Years: Team
- 1907: Oxford University
- 1903–1913: Devon

Career statistics
Competition	First-class
Matches	1
Runs scored	29
Batting average	14.50
100s/50s	–/–
Top score	19
Balls bowled	–
Wickets	–
Bowling average	–
5 wickets in innings	–
10 wickets in match	–
Best bowling	–
Catches/stumpings	–/–
- Source: Cricinfo, 10 February 2011

Robert Geoffrey Cruwys (10 March 1884 – 25 August 1951) was an English cricketer and clergyman. He was born in the family manor, Cruwys Morchard House, located in Cruwys Morchard, a small parish in Devon which takes the name from the Cruwys family who have been Lords of the Manor here since the reign of King John (1199–1216).

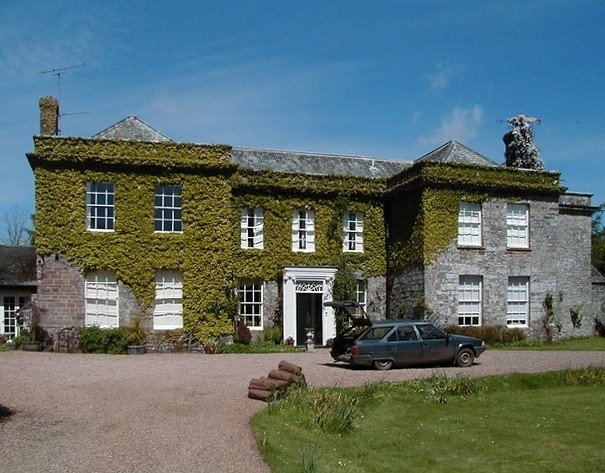
Cruwys Morchard House, Cruwys' place of birth

Cruwys was educated at Blundell's School, Tiverton; having gone up to Exeter College, Oxford (B.A. Lit. hum. 1907), Cruwys, played a single first-class match for Oxford University in 1907 against Worcestershire. In the university's first-innings, he scored 10 runs before being bowled by Ted Arnold and in their second-innings he scored 19 runs before being dismissed by John Cuffe. Four years previously he had made his debut for Devon in the 1903 Minor Counties Championship against Glamorgan. From 1903 to 1913, he represented the county in 56 matches, the last of which came against Berkshire.

From 1914 to 1916, Cruwys was curate at Ilfracombe; by 1916, he was shown as a rector at Cruwys Morchard. The following year he acted as a witness to the marriage of his brother Lewis George Cruwys (who also played Minor counties cricket for Devon) and Margaret Abercrombie at St David's, Exeter. In 1934, he was shown as living at Cruwys Morchard Rectory. Cruwys married Annie Gwendoline, daughter of Lt-Col John Bennett IMS. He died in the parish of his birth on 25 August 1951. His son, Squadron-Leader Geoffrey Edgar Cruwys, RAF (1920-2015), succeeded to the family manor.
