= Carlos Cruz =

Carlos Cruz may refer to:

- Carlos Cruz (boxer) (1937–1970), Dominican lightweight world champion
- Carlos Cruz (television presenter) (born 1942), Portuguese presenter and convicted paedophile
- Juan-Carlos Cruz (born 1962), celebrity chef on Food Network
- Carlos de la Cruz, Cuban-American businessman
- Carlos Roberto da Cruz Júnior (born 1986), Brazilian footballer
- Carlos Cruz González (1930–2018), Spanish artist
- Carlos Cruz (actor) (born 1960), Venezuelan actor
- Carlos Da Cruz (born 1974), French road bicycle racer

== See also ==
- Carlos Cruz-Diez (1923–2019), Venezuelan artist
