= Nomansland, Devon =

Hamlet in Devon, England

Coordinates: 50.911°N 3.650°W

Nomansland
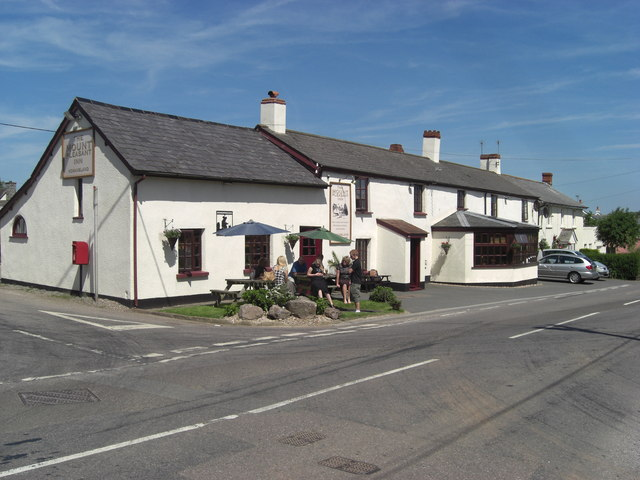
- Nomansland – The Mount Pleasant Inn (2008)

- Location within Devon
- OS grid reference: SS 83963 13812
- Civil parish: Cruwys Morchard, Thelbridge
- Shire county: Devon
- Region: South West
- Country: England
- Sovereign state: United Kingdom
- Postcode district: EX16
- Police: Devon and Cornwall
- Fire: Devon and Somerset
- Ambulance: South Western
- UK Parliament: Central Devon

Nomansland is a hamlet in Devon, England, with a population of about 150. It is eight miles west of Tiverton. It is so named because it was at one time a remote extra-parochial area where the Parishes of Witheridge, Thelbridge and Cruwys Morchard met (as they still do, but Nomansland is no longer extra-parochial). The hamlet is administered by Mid Devon District Council but is very close to the boundary between the Mid Devon District Council and North Devon District Council. It is in the parliamentary constituency of Central Devon.

There is a pub, the Mount Pleasant Inn, in the hamlet. The pub was listed for sale in 2024.
