= Cruz (disambiguation) =

Cruz is a surname of Iberian origin.

Cruz or La Cruz may also refer to:

== Places ==
Brazil:

- Cruz, Ceará, a municipality in the state of Ceará,
- Osvaldo Cruz, a municipality and county in the state of São Paulo

Chile:

- La Cruz, Chile, a city in the Quillota province, Valparaíso region

Costa Rica:

- La Cruz Canton, a canton in the province of Guanacaste
- La Cruz District, a district of and the capital of La Cruz canton, in the Guanacaste province

Mexico:

- La Cruz Municipality, one of the 67 municipalities of the state of Chihuahua
- La Cruz, Chihuahua, a town in La Cruz municipality, Chihuahua
- La Cruz, Sinaloa, a small city in Elota municipality, Sinaloa 1
- La Cruz, Tamaulipas, a community in Nuevo Laredo municipality, Tamaulipas
- La Cruz de Huanacaxtle, a village in Bahía de Banderas municipality, Nayarit

Peru:

- La Cruz District, Tumbes, a district of Tumbes province, in the Tumbes region '

Portugal:

- Achadas da Cruz, parish in the district of Porto Moniz, Madeira
- Cruz, Vila Nova de Famalicão, parish in the municipality of Vila Nova de Famalicão
- Porto da Cruz, parish in the district of Machico, Madeira

Puerto Rico

- Cruz, Moca, Puerto Rico, barrio in the municipality of Moca, in Puerto Rico

Spain:

- Puerto de la Cruz, a city on the island of Tenerife

United States:

- Cruz Bay, a city on the island of St. John in the U.S. Virgin Islands

Uruguay:

- La Cruz, Florida a town in the department of Florida

Venezuela:

- Puerto la Cruz, a coastal city in the state of Anzoátegui

== Other ==
- Cruz, a 1998 Mexican film
- Cruz family (Chile), founded by a naval captain in Chile
- Cruz family (Philippines), a Filipino family of entertainers
- Cruz Records, an American record label
- Cruz Azul, a Mexican football team
- Oswaldo Cruz Foundation, a biomedical research institute in Brazil
- Ilha de Vera Cruz (Island of the True Cross), the first name given to Brazil by early Portuguese explorers
- La cruz (film), a 1997 Argentine film
- USS Point Cruz, an escort aircraft carrier of the U.S. Navy commissioned just after World War II
- Cruz (Velocity Micro), a line of Android-based e-book readers and tablet PCs by Velocity Micro
- "Cruz", a song by Christina Aguilera from Stripped
- La Cruz, a Venezuelan reggaeton artist

== See also ==
- De La Cruz
- Santa Cruz (disambiguation)
- Veracruz (disambiguation)
- Crus (disambiguation)
- Cruise (disambiguation)
- Kruz (disambiguation)
