= Cruising =

Cruising may refer to:

- Cruising, on a cruise ship
- Cruising (driving), driving around for social purposes, especially by teenagers
- Cruising (maritime), leisurely travel by boat, yacht, or cruise ship
- Cruising for sex, the process of searching in public places for sexual partners, especially by gay men
  - Cruising (film), a 1980 film starring Al Pacino
  - Cruising (novel), the 1970 novel upon which the 1980 film is based
- Cruising (play), an Australian play by Alexandra Edmondson
- "Cruising" (song), a 1984 pop song by Sinitta
- "Cruisin'", a 2024 song by Childish Gambino from Bando Stone & the New World
- Cruising, a motor milestone for infants where they can walk by holding onto something and they make the transition to being a toddler

== See also ==
- Cruise (disambiguation)
- Cruiser (disambiguation)
- Cruis'n, a 2007 racing game
- Cruisin' (disambiguation)
- Cruz (disambiguation)
