= Kruss =

Kruss or Krüss may refer to:

- Krüss Optronic, a German company
- Gerhard Krüss, German chemist
- James Krüss, German writer and illustrator

== See also ==
- Krus (disambiguation)
