= Velocity Micro =

Privately held computer manufacturer

- Type: Privately owned
- Industry: Computer hardware
- Founded: 1997; 29 years ago
- Headquarters: Richmond, Virginia, U.S.
- Products: Desktops; Servers; Laptops; Workstations
- Subsidiaries: Overdrive PC
- Website: velocitymicro.com

Velocity Micro is an American computer manufacturer headquartered in Richmond, Virginia. Founded in 1997 by Randy Copeland, the company designs and assembles custom desktop computers as well as laptops. With its focus on professional workstations, gaming PCs, and servers, it primarily sells to consumers, businesses, educational institutions, and government organizations.

Though it was initially recognized as a boutique builder of high-performance desktop computers, the company has since expanded its product offerings to include engineering workstations, GPU-accelerated computing systems, rack-mount servers, and enterprise computing platforms.

The company assembles its PCs and supports its customers from its headquarters in Richmond, and takes particular pride in its domestic manufacturing.

== History ==
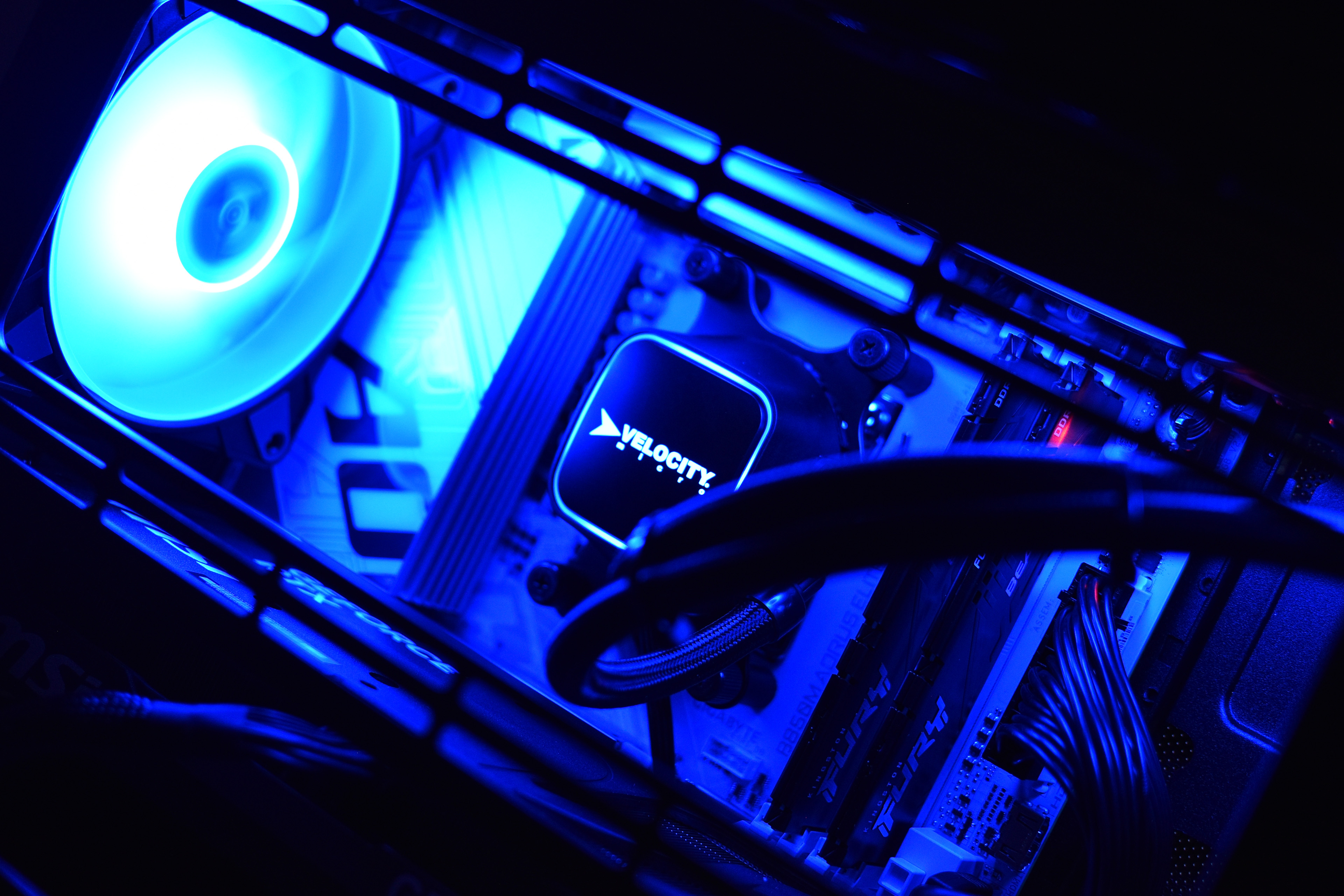
Since its inception, Velocity Micro customizes all LEDs within a PC, if present, to the company's signature blue.

Velocity Micro traces its origins to 1992 when founder Randy Copeland began designing and producing high-performance computer systems to run CAD software and other demanding applications. These computer systems were custom-built to facilitate the design process and tailored to the extreme needs of each client. Velocity Micro was officially founded in 1997 as an extension of this highly individualized, high-performance computing philosophy.

In 2001, Copeland accepted the opportunity to appear in Maximum PC's boutique roundup article entitled "Minor League, Major Performance". The quote which appeared in that February 2002 issue – "put together with the kind of care and craftsmanship the behemoth manufacturers can't offer" – propelled Velocity Micro forward and is still used by the company today.

In May 2007, Velocity Micro acquired former competing boutique builder, Overdrive PC, known for their extreme overclocking capabilities they term "HyperClocking." Since the acquisition, Velocity Micro has incorporated HyperClocking into many of its extreme gaming systems. Overdrive PC remains a separate brand under Velocity Micro ownership.

In 2010, Velocity Micro entered the eReader and tablet computer markets with the release of the first Cruz products: the Cruz Reader and the Cruz Tablet (T100). These Android-based devices featured 7" full-color screens. Five product generations of Cruz tablets were later produced and sold in 7", 8", and 10" screen models with close to a million units in the market by 2012. As of 2013, Velocity Micro no longer supports or offers these or any other Android-based devices for sale.

In 2011, Copeland was named a "Tech Icon" by the PC Magazine staff in an article celebrating 30 years of the PC for his contributions to the industry. He continues to have an active role at Velocity Micro as president and CEO.

In January 2024, Velocity Micro launched VelocityAI, a line of computer workstations designed to power local artificial intelligence models which include a bundled powerstack of development software.

== Products and services ==
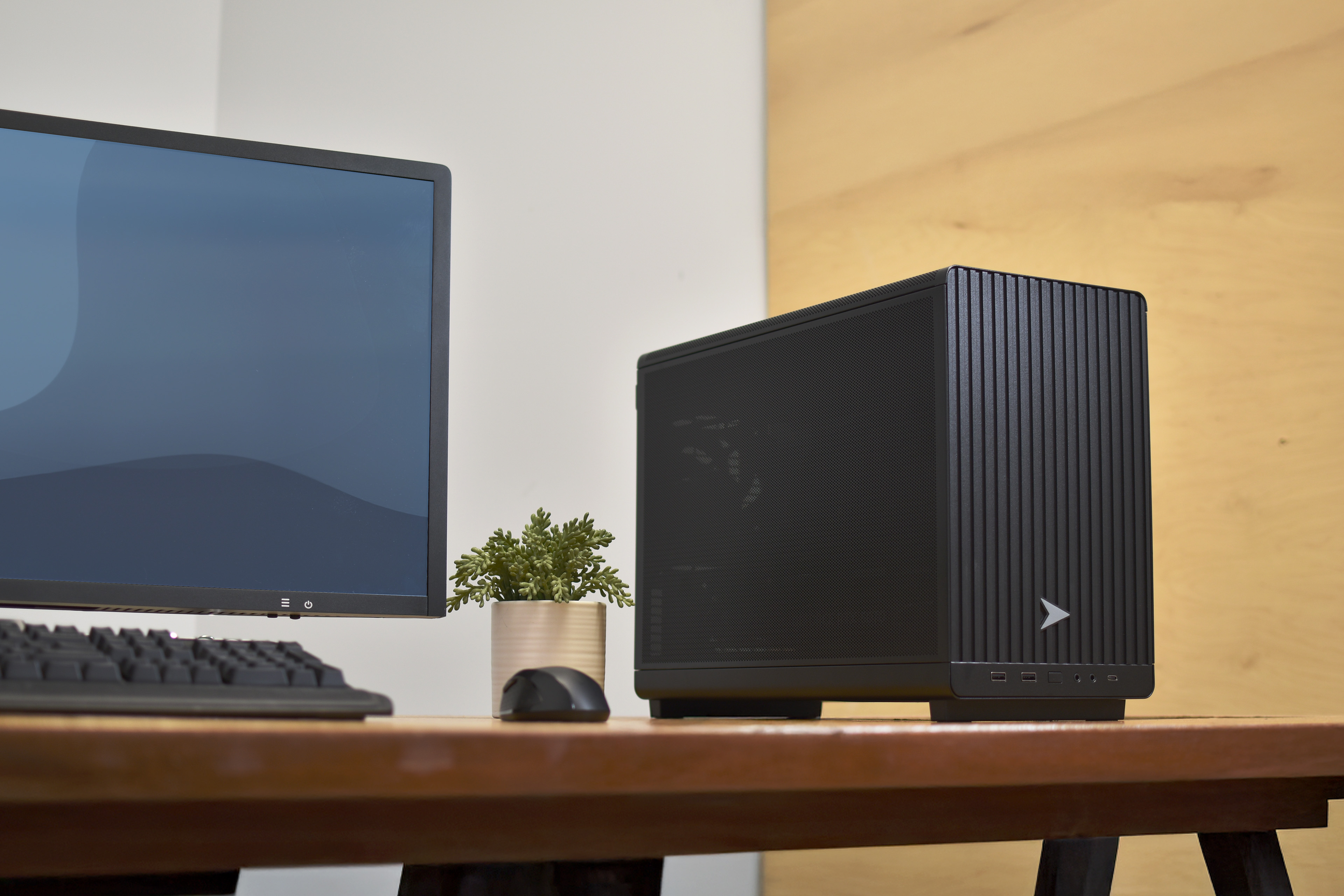
Velocity Micro's "ProMagix HD60" Workstation PC

Velocity Micro manufactures configurable computer systems for consumer, professional, and enterprise markets.

Its product lines currently include:

- "Raptor" series gaming desktops and laptops
- "ProMagix" series professional workstations and GPU computing systems
- "NoteMagix" series professional laptops
- "Vector" series home office desktops and laptops

Historically, the company also produced home theater PCs, netbooks, and the Cruz line of Android tablets and e-readers.

Velocity Micro assembles its systems in the United States and offers configurable hardware options to individual customer requirements.

== Partnerships ==
Velocity Micro has collaborated with hardware and software vendors to produce systems certified or optimized for professional applications.

In October 2019, Velocity Micro announced a partnership with Ansys that would provide access to resources, licenses, and benchmarks allowing Velocity Micro to build custom computers that are tailored to be integrated with Ansys applications.

Velocity Micro is an AMD Elite System Builder, and many of its current products feature AMD processors. The company has also incorporated hardware platforms from Intel and NVIDIA into all of its product lines.

== Retail ==
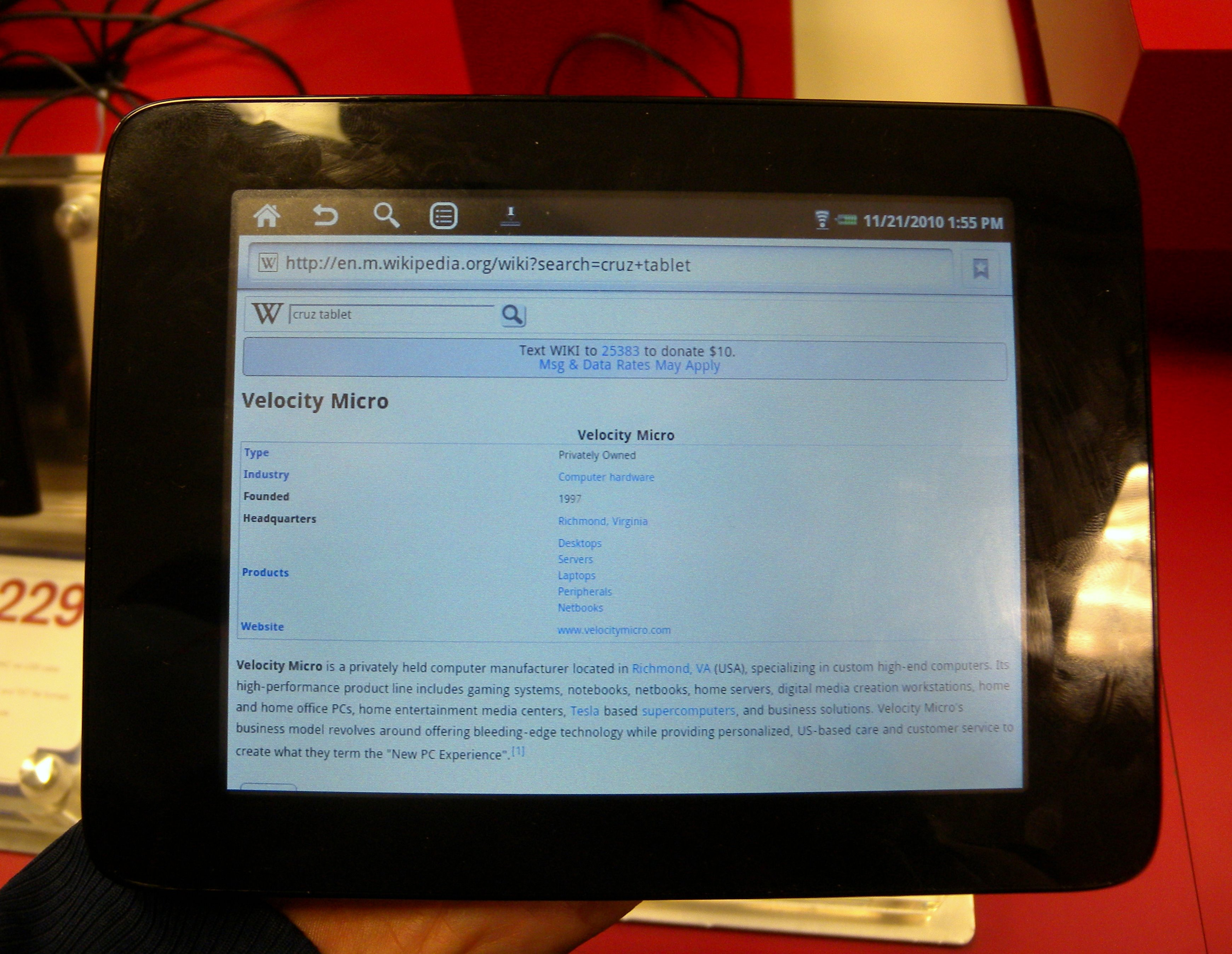
Cruz Reader

During the 2000s, Velocity Micro products were sold through several national retailers:

- In August 2005, Velocity Micro began offering pre-configured, high-performance desktops in select Best Buy stores across the country, followed by BestBuy.com that September.
- In July 2007, Velocity Micro began offering notebooks and desktops in Circuit City Stores across the country.
- In November 2008, Velocity Micro announced they were also moving into the online retail outlets Amazon.com, Newegg, TigerDirect, and Staples.
- In January 2009, Velocity Micro announced they were moving into Fry's stores nationwide.

In the mid-2010s, the company returned its primary emphasis to business-to-business and direct sales, pulling out of brick-and-mortar retailers.

== Reception ==
Velocity Micro systems have frequently been reviewed by technology publications, particularly within the enthusiast desktop and workstation markets.

Reviewers have generally praised the company's system assembly, component selection, customer support, and performance. These praises often manifest into awards: the company is currently decorated with over 75 industry media awards for performance and craftsmanship including 20 Editor's Choice awards from PC Magazine. CNET, Maximum PC, PC World, HardOCP, Computer Gaming World, and Computer Shopper have all awarded Velocity Micro machines high marks.

In one of its most publicly notable achievements, Velocity Micro participated in the 2018 Intel Extreme Rig Challenge and won the award for Best Performance, providing a 40% higher score than the previous year's entry.

In June of 2025, PC Magazine awarded Velocity Micro's Raptor Z55 their 20th Editors' Choice award, this one in the "cost-no-object gaming desktops" category. In November of that year, PC Magazine followed up by naming the Z55 their Best of the Year Gaming Desktop of 2025.

The company and its products have not been without criticism. Their android tablet line received mixed reception and was eventually discontinued. Currently, Velocity Micro products carry premium prices compared to their mass-market manufacturer competitors.
