= Bruce Cruse =

Australian former first-class cricketer

Personal information
- Full name: Bruce Andrew Cruse
- Born: 26 April 1967 (age 59); Launceston, Tasmania, Australia
- Batting: Right-handed
- Bowling: Slow left-arm orthodox

Domestic team information
- Years: Team
- 1985/86–1992/93: Tasmania

Career statistics
Competition	First-class	List A
Matches	25	2
Runs scored	1,040	43
Batting average	26.66	43.00
100s/50s	2/4	0/0
Top score	120	43
Balls bowled	930	60
Wickets	4	0
Bowling average	129.00	–
5 wickets in innings	0	–
10 wickets in match	0	–
Best bowling	1/12	–
Catches/stumpings	14/–	0/–
- Source: CricketArchive, 15 August 2010

Bruce Andrew Cruse (born 26 April 1967) is an Australian former first-class cricketer who played for Tasmania from 1985 to 1992. Cruse emigrated to the UK in 1993 and after time at Lancashire County Cricket Club he worked for the England and Wales Cricket Board in various roles, including as Director of Facilities and Infrastructure. In this role Cruse led a programme that delivered over £150million investment into grassroots cricket.
