= Veracruz Canyon =

The Veracruz Canyon is an underwater canyon. It is located off the eastern coast of Mexico in the Gulf of Mexico not far from the port city of Veracruz, Veracruz. Pemex is considering drilling for oil in the area in and around Veracruz Canyon.
