= Crus =

Crus can refer to:

- Crus, a subgenus of the fly genus Metopochetus
- Crus (lower leg)
- Crus, a plural of Cru (wine)
- CRUs, an abbreviation of Civil Resettlement Units
- Rektorenkonferenz der Schweizer Universitäten (CRUS; English: Rectors' Conference of the Swiss Universities)

Crus (pl.: crura) can also refer to other anatomical structures that are leg-shaped:

- crura of antihelix
- crus of cerebrum
- crus of clitoris
- crus of diaphragm
- crus of fornix
- crus of heart
- crus of penis
- crura of the stapes
- crura of superficial inguinal ring
- a leg-like structure of the little skate, used for locomotion

== See also ==
- Cru (disambiguation)
