= Cruisin' Classics =

Cruisin' Classics was a series of oldies music compilations released onto audiocassette from 1989-1990 by Shell Oil.

== About the series ==
The idea of the tape albums as described in a 1990 edition of The Stanford Daily, was to tailor them to a different cruising era. The covers of the cassette albums would feature a certain car from that era. A Chevy Bel-Air was on the cover of Volume VI album which featured the classics, "Blue Moon" by The Marcels, Runaround Sue by Dion, Yakety Yak by The Coasters and "Whole Lotta Shakin' Goin' On" by The Killer. The cover of Volume IV featured a Ford Mustang. The songs on the album were "Mr. Tambourine Man by The Byrds, "Chain Of Fools" by "Aretha Franklin" and "Monday Monday" by The Mamas and the Papas. Songs of a later era than the previous two were featured on Volume V. A Corvette was featured on the cover. The songs included "Listen To The Music" by The Doobie Brothers, "Could It Be I'm Falling In Love by The Spinners, and "Wake Me Up Before You Go-Go" by Wham!.

In 1990, it was announced in the May 21 issue of U.S. Oil Week that Shell was again launching its promotion of the cassettes to begin just before the 4th of July holidays with certain tapes being featured in lots of 3. Later that year in September, Shell petrol stations in L.A. were selling the tapes for $1.99 along with an 8 gallon fill-up of petrol.

=== Example ===
An example of seventies hits and eighties hits can be found on Cruisin' Classics Vol. V. This compilation album included "Listen To The Music" by The Doobie Brothers, "It's So Easy" by Linda Ronstadt, "Ventura Highway" by America, "Could It Be I'm Falling In Love" by The Spinners, "Can't Fight This Feeling" by REO Speedwagon, "The Heat Is On" by Glenn Frey, "Wake Me Up Before You Go-Go" by Wham!, "Kiss on My List" by Hall & Oates, "September" by Earth, Wind & Fire, and "Footloose" by Kenny Loggins.

== Note ==
Musician John Fogerty was surprised one day to find a song of his had ended up on what he described as "some schlocky cassette called Cruisin' Classics. This was surprising to him as he recounted in his book Fortunate Son: My Life, My Music, he thought that they, meaning Creedence Clearwater Revival members, had the right to approve what went on to compilation albums. He had come across this compilation album in 1989. A song by The Beach Boys was also on it. The song was licensed to the cassette's company by Fantasy Records. This wasn't supposed to occur and caused great annoyance.

There is a typo on one compilation. The Four Seasons are mistakenly given as "The Four Seasons (Spring)", with the printer obviously having mistaken the name for the classical piece.

== Releases (selective) ==
List
Title	Label	Series	Year	Notes #
Cruisin' Classics Vol. I 60's & 70's	CBS Special Products BT 21104	Cruisin' Classics	1989	
Cruisin' Classics Vol. II 70's & 80's	CBS Special Products BT 21105	Cruisin' Classics	1989	
Cruisin' Classics Vol. III 50's & 60's	CBS Special Products BT 21103	Cruisin' Classics	1989	Also Shell BT 21103
Cruisin' Classics Vol. IV	CBS Special Products BT 21718	Cruisin' Classics	1990	
Cruisin' Classics Vol. V	CBS Special Products BT 21719	Cruisin' Classics	1990	
Cruisin' Classics Vol. VI	CBS Special Products BT 21720	Cruisin' Classics	1990	
