= Cruz (Velocity Micro) =

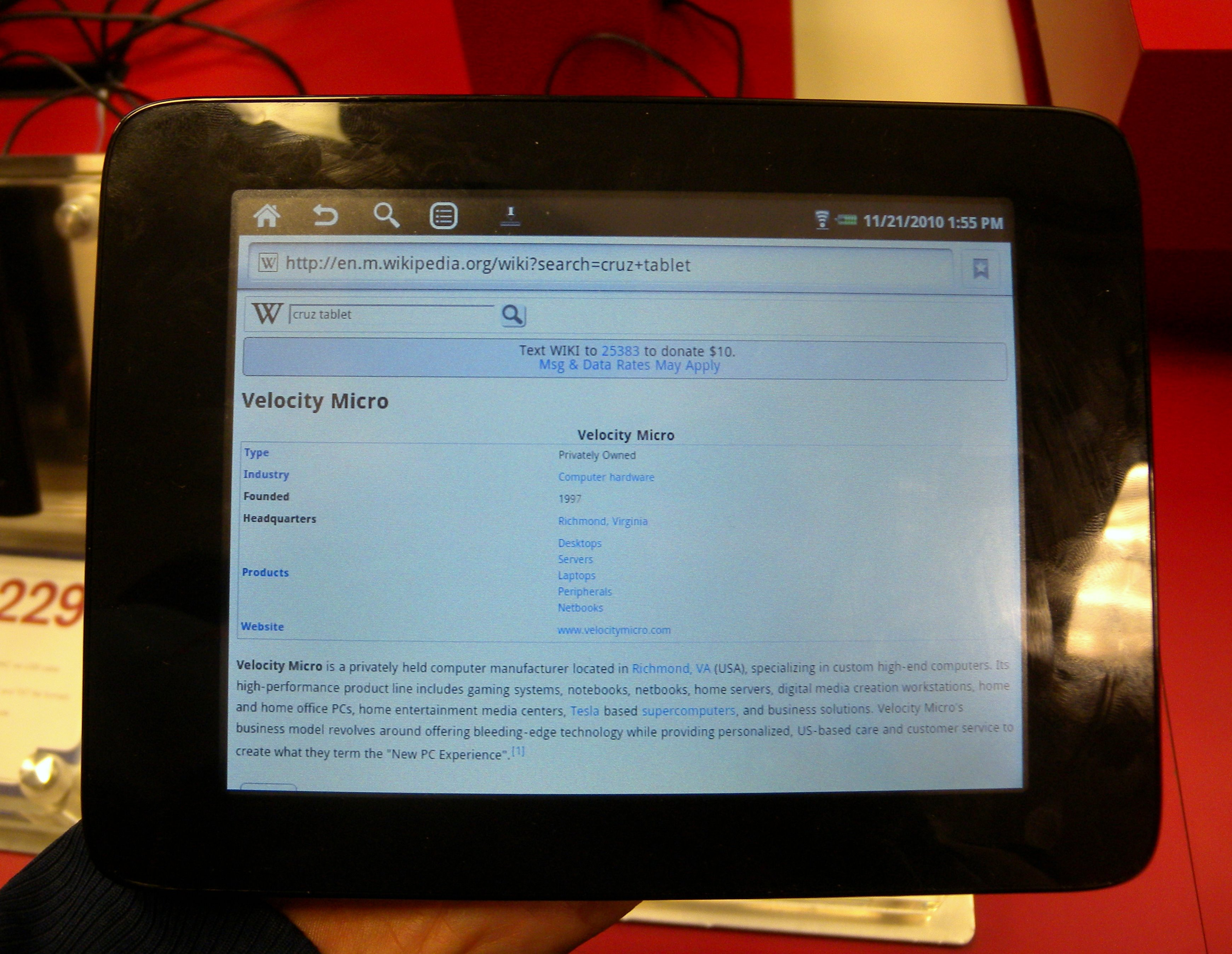
- Cruz Reader
- Type: E-book reader and tablet computer
- Operating system: Android 2.0, 2.2, 2.3, or 4.0

Cruz is a line of Android-based e-book readers and tablet computers by Velocity Micro, a privately held computer manufacturer located in Richmond, Virginia that specializes in custom high-end computers.

== History ==
Cruz debuted in 2010, when Velocity Micro announced the release of the Cruz Reader and Cruz Tablet. These devices are Android-based multimedia gadgets. Both devices feature 7" full color screens. The Cruz Reader utilizes a resistive touchscreen, whereas the Cruz Tablet makes use of the more advanced and responsive capacitive touch screen.

At CES 2011, Velocity Micro unveiled plans to release three new tablets, including 10" and 8" models, as well as another 7" tablet. The specific release dates and estimated retail prices are not currently available. It was reported that these new tablets, operating on Android 2.2 or Android 2.3, would feature dual cameras, Tegra processors, Bluetooth 2.1, GPS, and Micro HDMI out. Velocity Micro also announced plans to release in 2011 the Android-based Cruz Watch.

== Cruz Reader ==
The Cruz Reader is an Android 2.0-based e-book reader. It has a 7-inch full color, 800 × 600 resolution resistive touchscreen. The Cruz Reader's pre-installed e-book reading app is the Borders e-book reader application. However, because Borders is now defunct, Velocity Micro has released a firmware update that changes the e-book reader application to Kobo Inc.'s. The only models are the R101, R102, and R103.

== Cruz Tablet ==
Cruz Tablets represent Velocity Micro's higher-end Android-based devices. They all use a capacitive touchscreen. The original Cruz Tablet (model T103, 104, or 105) is a widescreen-format (16:9) device. A later version of the Cruz Tablet (model T301) was released in December 2010 with a 4:3 7" screen and Kindle for Android application pre-installed. In addition, the T408 and T410 have refurbished models available.

Models include:

- Cruz T100 series (Android 2.0, upgradable to Android 2.2)
  - T103
  - T104
  - T105
- Cruz T301 (Android 2.0, upgradable to Android 2.2)
- Cruz PS37 (Android 2.3)
- Cruz T400 series (Android 2.3)
  - Cruz T408
  - Cruz T410
- Cruz T500 series (Android 4.0.3)
  - Cruz T501 (not yet available)
  - Cruz T507 (not yet available)
  - Cruz T508
  - Cruz T510

The T100 and T301 tablets have a problem where the browser will crash when google.com or websites that use Google Analytics are accessed. Velocity Micro addresses this on its website as a Google JavaScript problem. Attempts at addressing this issue through the velocitymicro.com support receive this response: "The update Google has implemented to their search engine isn't compatible to the T100 series hardware. The device is a legacy model."

== Model comparison ==
	R100	T100	T301	PS47	T400 series	T500 series
Display	7" TFT LCD resistive	7" TFT capacitive	7"/8"/10" TFT multi-touch capacitive (Note: The T301 and PS47 each have a screen diagonal of 7 inches. The T408 has a screen diagonal of 8 inches, while the T410 has a screen diagonal of 10 inches.)			7"/8"/10" LCD multi-touch capacitive (Note: The T501 and T507 each have a screen diagonal of 7 inches. The T508 and T510 have screen diagonals of 8 and 10 inches, respectively.)
Dimensions	7.56" × 5.62" × 0.58"	7.5" × 4.8" × 0.6"	7.5" × 5.6" × 0.6"	7.5" × 5.8" × 0.3"	8.5" × 6.5" × 0.4" (T408); 10.8" × 6.8" × 0.4" (T410)	7.6" × 4.7" × 0.3" (T507); 7.9" × 6.1" × 0.4" (T508); 9.5" × 7.5" × 0.4" (T510)
Aspect ratio	4:3	16:9	4:3	4:3	4:3 (T408); 16:9 (T410)	16:9 (T501, T507); 4:3 (T508, T510)
Screen resolution	800 × 600	800 × 480	800 × 600	800 × 600	800 × 600 (T408); 1024 × 600 (T410)	1024 × 600 (T507); 1024 × 768 (T508, T510)
Processor	600 MHz	800 MHz		1 GHz Cortex A8		1.2 GHz Cortex A8
Memory	256MB	512MB	256MB	512MB		1GB DDR3
OS	Android 2.0	Android 2.0 (Note: The T100 series and the T301 are both upgradable to Android 2.2. Currently, all T301 tablets bought directly from Velocity Micro have the update pre-installed.)		Android 2.3		Android 4.0.3
GPU	Yes	Yes	Yes	Yes	SGX540	Dual Mali-400 2D/3D Core
Adobe Flash	No	No	No	Yes (Note: Flash is not pre-installed.)	Flash 10.3	Flash 11.1
Storage	256MB (Note: The Cruz Reader has an internal 2GB microSD card (Special-Edition) or 4GB microSD card (regular) as well.)	1GB	2GB		4GB	8GB
Wireless	Wi-Fi (802.11b/g)	Wi-Fi (802.11b/g/n)		Wi-Fi (802.11b/g/n), Bluetooth 2.1	Wi-Fi (802.11b/g/n)	
External ports	Mini USB, SD/SDHC, DC in, 3.5mm headphone jack			Micro USB, microSD, 3.5mm headphone jack		Micro USB, Mini HDMI out, microSD, DC-5V, (Note: A DC-5V port exists for at least the T510.) 3.5mm headphone jack
Camera	No	No	No	Front-facing		Front-facing (T507); Front and rear (T508, T510) (Note: The T508's and T510's rear-facing cameras have 2.0 megapixels.)
Microphone	No	No	No	No	Yes	Yes
Battery life	≈10+ hours, 6 hours of video	≈10+ hours	6 hours of video	≈6.5 hours	≈7 hours	5+ hours

== Retailers ==
Cruz devices were sold in several major consumer electronics retailers in the United States including Best Buy, Borders, Sears, QVC, and Amazon.

The model T104 was sold by woot.com on 29 May 2012.
