= Leslie Fields-Cruz =

American journalist

Leslie Fields-Cruz is an American journalist and media executive, who as of 2025 serves as the Executive Director of Black Public Media (BPM).

Fields-Cruz joined BPM in 2001, and has had a number of roles there since. She is a producer of the award-winning PBS series AfroPoP: The Ultimate Cultural Exchange.

Fields-Cruz is the chair of the president's circle and a former president of New York Women in Film & Television, the board secretary of the New Era Creative Space, and was listed in Crain's New York's 2021 list of Notable Black Business Leaders.
