= Cruse =

Cruse may refer to:

- Cruse (surname), a list of people and a fictional character with this name
- Cruse Bereavement Care, a UK charity
- Cruse Memorial Heliport, a private heliport in Douglas County, Oregon, United States

== See also ==
- Cruise (disambiguation)
- Cruz (disambiguation)
- Cruze (disambiguation)
- Widow's cruse: a reference to a story involving Elijah
