= Cruizer =

Cruizer may refer to

- Cruizer-class brig-sloop, a Royal Navy ship class in service 1797–1826
- Cruizer-class sloop, a Royal Navy ship class in service 1852–1912
- HMS Cruizer, eleven ships of the Royal Navy that have borne the name Cruizer or Cruiser

== See also ==
- Cruiser
