= Alex Cruz =

Alex Cruz may refer to:

- Alex Cruz (astronomer), American astronomer
- Álex Cruz (businessman) (born 1966), Spanish businessman, ex Chief Executive of Vueling Airlines, and Chief Executive of British Airways
- Alex Cruz (footballer, born 1985), Brazilian football attacking midfielder
- Álex Cruz (footballer, born 1986), Spanish football left-back
- Álex Cruz (footballer, born 1990), Spanish football midfielder
