= George Kruse =

Australian rules footballer

Personal information
- Full name: George Thomas Kruse
- Born: 2 February 1880; Pleasant Creek, Victoria
- Died: 30 March 1965 (aged 85); Preston, Victoria
- Original team: Footscray (VFA)

Playing career^{1}
Years	Club	Games (Goals)
1902	Fitzroy	1 (0)
- ^{1} Playing statistics correct to the end of 1902.

George Thomas Kruse (2 February 1880 – 30 March 1965) was an Australian rules footballer who played with Fitzroy.
