= Veracruz (disambiguation) =

Veracruz is a state in Mexico. Veracruz or Vera Cruz (literally "True Cross") may also refer to:

== People ==
- María González Veracruz (born 1979), Spanish politician
- Philip Vera Cruz (1904–1994), Filipino American labor leader
- Tomé Vera Cruz (born 1955?), São Tomé and Príncipe politician
- Vera Cruz, a fictional character in Pedro Almodóvar's 2011 Spanish-language film The Skin I Live In

== Places ==
Brazil:

- Ilha de Vera Cruz, the name originally given to Brazil by its first Portuguese colonizers
- Vera Cruz, Bahia
- Vera Cruz, Rio Grande do Sul
- Vera Cruz, São Paulo

East Timor:

- Vera Cruz (East Timor), a subdistrict of Dili District

Honduras:

- Veracruz, Copán

Mexico:

- Veracruz (city), largest city in the state of Veracruz (formerly spelled "Vera Cruz")
- Veracruz (Mexibús), a BRT station in Ecatepec de Morelos

Panama:

- Veracruz, Panama

Portugal:

- Vera Cruz, Aveiro, former civil parish, incorporated into Glória e Vera Cruz

Spain:

- Veracruz, Huesca

United States:

- Vera Cruz, Indiana
- Vera Cruz, Missouri
- Vera Cruz, Ohio
- Vera Cruz, Pennsylvania

== Arts and entertainment ==
- Vera Cruz (film), 1954 motion picture starring Gary Cooper and Burt Lancaster
- Vera Cruz (album), 2021 release by Edu Falaschi
- "Veracruz", a song from Warren Zevon's 1978 album Excitable Boy
- Verra Cruz, an English rock band

== Other ==
- Glória e Vera Cruz, civil parish in the municipality of Aveiro
- C.D. Veracruz, defunct Mexican football club
- VeraCruz (computer virus), alternative name for the extinct Ping-Pong virus
- Veracruz Canyon, deep-sea canyon in the Gulf of Mexico.
- Hyundai Veracruz, mid-size 5-door SUV
- Vera Cruz Futebol Clube, Brazilian football club
- Classic Veracruz culture (c. 100 to 1000 CE), a cultural area of the present-day Mexican state of Veracruz

== See also ==
- Battle of Veracruz (disambiguation)
