= Johannes Hohlenberg =

Danish painter (1881–1960)

Johannes Hohlenberg (21 May 1881 – 10 May 1960) was a Danish author, artist and Anthroposophist.

== Early life and work ==
Hohlenberg was born in Copenhagen, the son of assistant pastor at Holmens Church Ove Hohlenberg (1835–98) and Emilie Dahlerup (1852–1923). His paternal great-grandfathers were Chief Ship Builder at the Royal Danish Dockyard Frantz Hohlenberg and historian and former Danish prime minister Ove Malling. His maternal grandfather was royal physician to Frederik VII Edvard Dahlerup (1812-1882). His maternal grandmother was the daughter of librarian at the Classen Library and former planter in the Danish West Indies Georg Gordon Mac Dougall.

Hohlenberg studied painting under Kristian Zahrtmann from 1896 and lived as a painter in Paris from 1906 until 1911. He was a member of Le Salon de la Société Nationale and later of the Salon d'Automne.

== Anthroposophy ==
In Paris, Hohlenberg became acquainted with Mirra Alfassa and met her nearly every evening for studying the teachings of occultism. When Paul and Mirra Richard had travelled to Pondicherry in 1914 to meet Sri Aurobindo, they invited Hohlenberg to join them and help publishing a journal. But due to the war and other circumstances he could come only in 1915, staying for a month. During this brief stay he took one of the few photos of Sri Aurobindo and prepared some sketches on whose basis he created an oil painting later on.

Through his participation in talks of Sri Aurobindo with his disciples, Hohlenberg had acquired some basic knowledge which he used in 1916 for publishing his book titled Yoga i dens betydning for Europa (Yoga and its significance for Europe). In 1954 the title was also published in a German translation in whose Preface Hohlenberg referred to his stay with Sri Aurobindo and the talks with him as a source. At a later stage he started taking an interest in Anthroposophy and became a disciple of Rudolf Steiner, playing an important role as the general secretary of a newly founded anthroposophical society in Denmark and helping to spread Steiner's thought there.

== Publications ==
Among Hohlenberg's works are Goethes Faust i det 20. Aarhundrede from 1928, a biography of Søren Kierkegaard from 1940, and further treatments of Kierkegaard's works. He published the cultural magazine Øjeblikket between 1947 and 1954, and contributed to the Norwegian magazines Samtiden and Janus. He also brought out the whole text of the Bhagavad Gita as well as two essays of Sri Aurobindo and an extract from his work "The Life Divine" in Danish translation.

== Literature ==
- Johannes Hohlenberg. In: Klaus J. Bracker: Veda and Living Logos. Anthroposophy and Integral Yoga. Lindisfarne Books 2018, p. 227-232. ISBN 978-1-58420-938-6
