= Ricardo Cruz =

Ricardo Cruz may refer to:

- Ricardo Cruz (athlete) (born 1946), Salvadoran Olympic athlete
- Ricardo Cruz (Brazilian footballer) (born 1962), Brazilian football manager and former goalkeeper
- Ricardo Cruz (lawyer) (1943–1993), American lawyer
- Ricardo Cruz (singer) (born 1982), Brazilian singer
- Ricardo Cruz (Mexican footballer) (born 1997), Mexican football midfielder
