= Cruwys Morchard =

Village in Devon, England

- Village
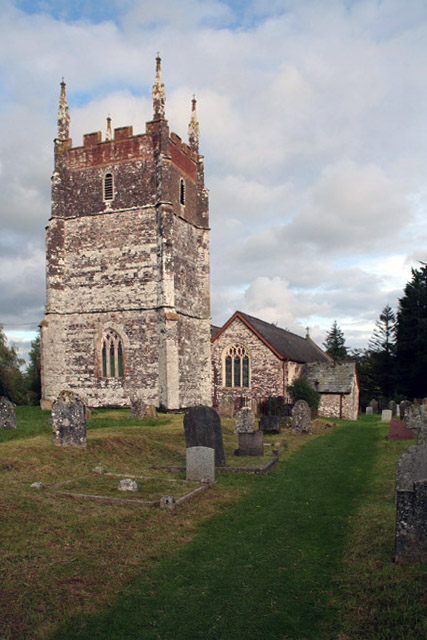
- Church of the Holy Cross, Cruwys Morchard (2005)

- Location within Devon Location within the United Kingdom
- Coordinates: 50°53′52″N 3°36′07″W
- Country: England
- County: Devon
- District: Mid Devon

Area
  - Total: 2,333 ha (5,765 acres)

Population (2000)
  - Total: 461
  - Density: 19.8/km^{2} (51.2/sq mi)
- Time zone: UTC+0:00 (GST)

Cruwys Morchard /ˌkruːz ˈmɔːrtʃɑːrd/ is an ecclesiastical and civil parish in the Mid Devon district of the county of Devon, England. It is located about four to five miles west of Tiverton along the road to Witheridge. The town had a population of 461 at the time of the 2001 census.

The parish covers about 5,765 acres (23.33 km^{2}) of land, and comprises a number of scattered houses and farms, and three small hamlets, namely Pennymoor, Way Village and Nomansland. The church and the manor house are in the centre of the parish. The parish takes its name from the Cruwys family who have been Lords of the Manor here since the reign of King John (1199–1216).

== Etymology ==
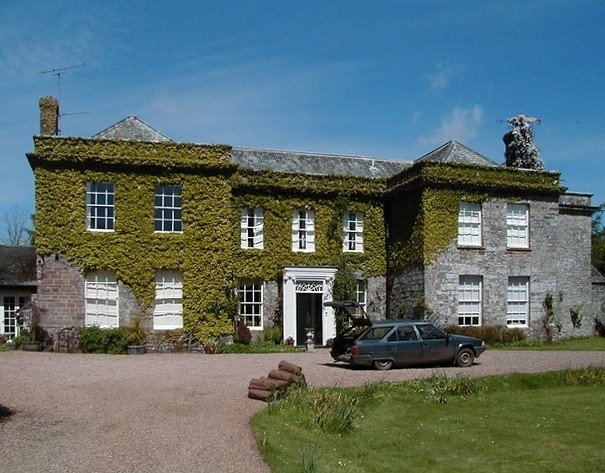
Cruwys Morchard House, birthplace of Robert Cruwys

The name Morchard is first attested in the Domesday Book of 1086, in the forms Morchet, Morceth, and Morcet. It is derived from the Common Brittonic words mǭr ("big") and cę̃d ("wood") (corresponding to modern Welsh mawr coed; thus it once meant "large wood". The affix of Cruwys, first attested as part of the place-name between 1257 and 1280, is from the settlement's possession by the de Crues family, who held the manor there in the thirteenth century, and to distinguish the settlement from the nearby Morchard Bishop.

== History ==
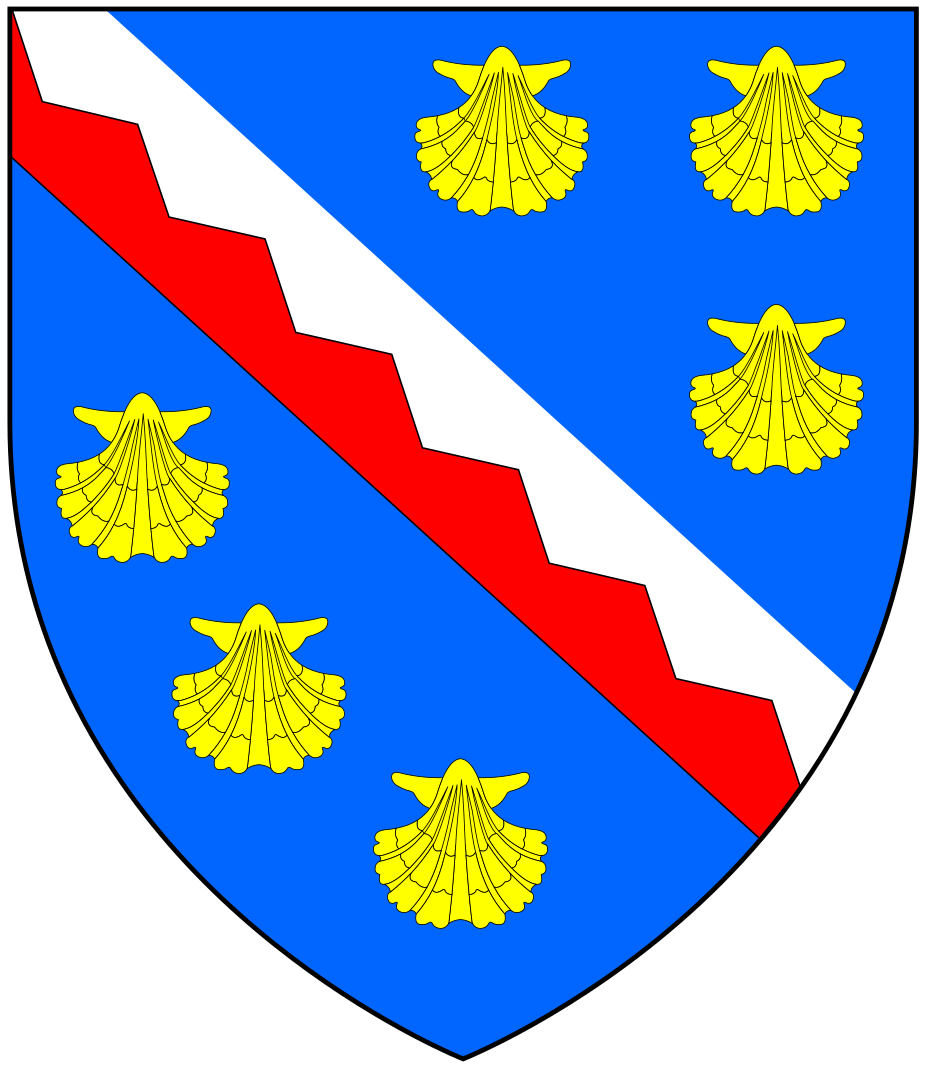
Arms of Cruwys: Azure, a bend per bend indented argent and gules between six escallops or

The manor of Morceth is mentioned twice in the Domesday Book of 1086, with part being held in-chief by William Cheever, the 35th of his 46 Devonshire holdings, and part being held in-chief by Geoffrey de Montbray, Bishop of Coutances, the 73rd of his 99 Devonshire holdings. William Cheever's lands later formed the feudal barony of Bradninch from which Cruwys Morchard was later held by the Cruwys family.

== Church of Holy Cross ==
It is believed that a wooden church existed in Cruwys Morchard from the time of Godfrey de Sowy, who was the first rector in 1262. The Church of the Holy Cross was built in 1529 with a spire on top of the church tower. This, however, was struck by lightning in 1689, and the consequent major fire, which melted the bells, necessitated the rebuilding of the top stage of the tower in brick. It also destroyed painted windows which bore the arms of the Cruwys family. The repairs, which also involved a new roof and new pews, took thirteen years to complete. The windows were replaced with stained glass renderings of the Cruwys arms.

There was also a chapel belonging to Cruwys Morchard House which was the burial place of the Cruwys family, but the chapel was destroyed by Oliver Cromwell, and it is believed that many family monuments were destroyed at the same time.

== People ==
- Robert Cruwys (1884–1951), cricketer and clergyman
- Margaret Campbell Speke Cruwys (1894–1968), Devon historian.
- Sir Robert Cruwys (d 1362) was knighted for his service in France in the Hundred Years War; he probably fought at the Battle of Crecy on 26 August 1346 and the Battle of Poitiers on 19 September 1356
- Robertus de Cruwes was a Member of Parliament for Devon in 1340 and 1344
- Hugh Peters (1598–1660), the preacher and regicide, spent much of his childhood at Cruwys Morchard House with his uncle and aunt Lewis Cruwys and Sarah Cruwys née Treffry.
- Cruwys Morchard is the alias of Clytie Potts, a fictional character in the 2006 novel A Darkling Plain, written by Devon resident Philip Reeve.
