= Amina Cruz =

American photographer

Amina Cruz is a photographer known for capturing queer punk scenes within the Latino community and breaking cultural barriers with her work. Cruz captures the intimate moments shared between queer folk and is trying to expand the Latino identity with their work.

== Biography ==
Cruz was born in Los Angeles, California and has lived in Tampa, Florida as well as New York and received a BFA in photography in 2002 from Parsons School of Design in New York. Cruz graduated from the University of California, Los Angeles with an MFA in photography in 2023 where she worked under the tutelage of Catherine Opie.

She first starting taking film photographs when she was a 14 year old teenager as a way of navigating her emotions. During her teen years she was inspired by punk music and the photography that accompanied it via magazines and album inserts, as well as news and war photography that she encountered at her school library.

She has gone on to develop a unique style; Spin Magazine described Cruz’s photographs as utopias and landscapes filled with conversations, power, relationships, memories, music, joy, and fantasies that you can feel.

== Exhibitions ==
- Staring Into The Sun, Webber Gallery, Los Angeles, CA, 2023
- as we exit we enter, No Moon, Los Angeles, CA, 2023
- Queer Califas, Highways, Santa Monica, CA, 2023
- Forging Territories: Queer Afro and Latinx Contemporary Art, San Diego Art Institute, San Diego, CA, 2019
- Round Hole Square Peg: LGBTQ Photo Show, Long Hall, West Hollywood, CA, 2018
- Paraisos: Queer LA Latinx Art, The Village at Ed Gould Plaza, Hollywood, CA, 2018
