= Alberto Cruz =

Alberto Cruz may refer to:

- Alberto Cruz (basketball) (born 1999), Mexican basketball player
- Alberto Cruz (race walker) (born 1972), Mexican race walker
- Alberto Cruz (soccer) (born 1971), American soccer player
- Alberto Segismundo Cruz (1901–1987), Filipino poet, short story writer and novelist
