= Cru =

Cru or CRU may refer to:

== Music ==
- Cru (group), an American hip hop group
- Cru (album), an album by Seu Jorge
- CRU (EP), an EP by Gnarwolves

== Organizations ==
- Amsterdam Crusaders, an American football team in the Netherlands
- Cru (Christian organization), an interdenominational Christian parachurch organization
- The Crusader Union of Australia, a Christian youth organisation
- Commission for Regulation of Utilities, Ireland
- Civil Resettlement Unit, for repatriated WWII British POWs
- Climatic Research Unit, University of East Anglia, UK

== Other uses ==
- Crux (Cru), a constellation
- Cru (wine), a high-quality vineyard or group of vineyards
