= Max Kruse (disambiguation) =

Max Kruse may refer to:

- Max Kruse (born 1988), German footballer
- Max Kruse (Australian footballer) (born 1958), Australian footballer
- Max Kruse (author) (1921–2015), German author, known mostly for his children's books
- Max Kruse (sculptor) (1854–1942), German sculptor; father of the above
