= Fanny Tuxen =

Danish writer (1832–1906)

Fanny Tuxen née Seemann (1832–1906) was a Danish writer who initially used the pen name Eva.

In connection with her daughter's wedding in 1880, she wrote Til Bruden fra en Sølvbrud (To the Bride from a Silver Wedding Bride), expressing her views on how to develop a good Christian home. But she first became really successful in 1866, when she published some of the stories she had told her young daughter as En moders fortællinger for små børn (A Mother's Tales for Small Children). She continued writing short stories for small children, publishing several collections until the mid-1890s. In parallel, she wrote equally successful novels for teenage girls which emphasized the virtues of family life. The last of these, Den anden Hustru (The Second Wife), was published in 1895. Thanks to her clear writing style and stories which always ended happily, Tuxen remained popular for many years.

== Biography ==
Born on 9 June 1832 in Copenhagen, Fanny Seemann was the daughter of the actor and later customs inspector Corfitz Seemann (1800–75) and his wife Victorine Mathilde Tertia née Ryge (1810–75). She was the oldest of the family's six children. In January 1852, she married the naval officer Lieutenant Captain Elias Christian Carl Tuxen (1812–91) with whom she had a daughter, Harriet Kirstine Mathilde (1860–92).

Brought up in a prosperous upper-class family, after her marriage she told her little daughter stories she made up herself. Compared to other published works she discovered, she felt her own tales were more attractive. As a result, she became an author in her own right, publishing a collection titled En moders fortællinger for små børn in 1866. Thanks to its success, she published further collections of children's stories, including Fra Barnets Verden (From a Child's World, 1883), Tre Smaapiger (Three Little Girls, 1886), Naar Lampen er tændt (When the Lamp is Lit, 1889), Julehistorier for Børn (Christmas Stories for Children, 1894) and Nye Julehistorier (New Christmas Stories, 1900). Her stories typically feature children living in the town or countryside, often gaining happiness as a result of their faith in God. As they were exciting, they became popular with children.

Her novels for teenage girls were equally successful. These included Ellinor Falsen (1887), Paa Lovens Grund (In the Name of the Law, 1891), Eva Ross (1895), Et Plejebarn (A Foster Child, 1903), Hjemvendt (Returning Home, 1904) and Den anden Hustru (The Second Wife, 1905). In a clearly written style, all her novels were set in families where conflicts were resolved, resulting in happy endings. They remained popular for many years.

Fanny Tuxen died in Hellerup on 24 April 1906 and was buried in Copenhagen's Holmen Cemetery.
