= Frederik Vinding Kruse =

Danish jurist

Louis Frederik Vinding Kruse (1880–1963) was a Danish jurist. From 1914 to 1950 he was a professor at the school formerly known as Rets- og Statsvidenskabelige Fakultet (Jurisprudence and Political Science Faculty) (today known as the Juridiske Fakultet, or Legal Faculty) of the University of Copenhagen.

== Biography ==
He was one of the most beloved jurists of his time and was awarded the Hans Christian Ørsted Medal in 1933 for his five-volume work Ejendomsretten (Property Law).

In 1940, he was offered a position with the German government which he refused, although he had sympathy with the goals of the right-wing political current in Europe.

After World War II, he was accused of having been a Nazi by rival professor Alf Ross, but he continued his work as a legal scholar and author.

Vinding Kruse was an adherent to the pure philosophy of natural law and was a sharp critic of the idea that courts should consist of an elite group to compel the masses toward a higher moral condition by controlling man's natural evil tendencies. In this respect also Alf Ross came to be a major opponent of Vinding Kruse, and the main focus of Vinding Kruse's sharp criticism was Alf Ross' dissertation, Læren om Retskilderne (1926), which was a major factor in Vinding Kruse's recommendation that Alf Ross not remain part of the Faculty.

Louis Frederik Vinding Kruse was born on 30 July 1880 in Thisted, the son of Christoffer Vinding Kruse and Maren Oline Nielsen. On 20 December 1920 he married, in Jerusalem kirke in Copenhagen, Pouline Petersen, born 24 February 1884 in Helsingør, who had previously married Aage Viggo Gertsen Kempel in 1904 but had divorced him.

Frederik and Maren had one son, Anders Vinding Kruse, born 4 May 1921 in Copenhagen. Anders followed his father in the law: 1947 Bachelor of Laws, 1950 Doctor of Laws. 1951 professor at the Aarhus University and 1955–91 at the Copenhagen University. 1968 a guest professor at the University of California, Berkeley. Anders married a social worker, Tove V.K.Stormlund in 1951 and they had a daughter Sysette Vinding Kruse in 1954 and a son Søren Vinding Kruse in 1958. Anders died on 15 January 1995.

For an in-depth biography, see Frederik Vinding Kruse (1880–1963): En Juridisk Biografi by Jens Evald (ISBN 87-574-1242-1), published in 2006, Jurist- og Økonomforbundets Forlag (Danish).
