= Rupert D'Cruze =

British conductor

Rupert D'Cruze is a British conductor who resides in New Zealand.

His earliest musical training was as a chorister in the Temple Church Choir, London. He later performed in the London Schools Symphony Orchestra and the European Union Youth Orchestra. He played and taught the trombone prior to becoming a conductor.

In 1987, at the Royal Academy of Music, D'Cruze was awarded the Philharmonia Conducting Prize. He also has received prizes at the Tokyo International Conducting Competition in 1991 and at the Hungarian International Conducting Competition in 1992.

In 2006, D'Cruze moved to New Zealand, and was appointed musical director of the Trust Waikato Symphony Orchestra in 2009, and in March 2010 became the music director for the Dalewool Auckland Brass. He is also a founder member of the Waikato Brass Quintet.
