= Margaret Cruwys =

British historian

Margaret Campbell Speke Cruwys
- Born: 20 October 1894; Ayr, Ayrshire, Scotland
- Died: 12 March 1968 (aged 73); 31 St Peter Street, Tiverton, Devon
- Burial place: Church of the Holy Cross, Cruwys Morchard, Devon
- Occupations: Archivist and Devon historian
- Spouse: Lewis George Cruwys (m. 1917)
- Parent: Alexander Houghton Abercrombie (father)
- Awards: Fellowship of the Society of Antiquaries of London (1950)

Margaret Campbell Speke Cruwys née Abercrombie (20 October 1894 – 12 March 1968) was a British archivist and historian, specializing in the history of Devon. She was born in Ayr, Ayrshire, Scotland, and was the daughter of Alexander Houghton Abercrombie, an officer in the 21st Royal Scots Fusiliers. She married Lewis George Cruwys of Cruwys Morchard, Devon, on 19 November 1917 at St David's Church, Exeter. She became a member of the Devonshire Association in 1931 and was elected president in 1952. She was a member of the Devon and Exeter Institution, serving first as their secretary and then as president. Cruwys was editor of Devon and Cornwall Notes and Queries for thirty years. She was awarded a Fellowship of the Society of Antiquaries of London in 1950 for the work she did indexing and cataloguing the large collection of family papers held at Cruwys Morchard House. She died on 12 March 1968 at 31 St Peter Street, Tiverton, Devon, and was buried on 18 March 1968 at the Church of the Holy Cross, Cruwys Morchard, Devon.

== Work ==
- The Diary of John Cruwys of Cruwys Morchard (1682-8). Devon and Cornwall Notes & Queries, Vol. XVIII, (1933-4), pp. 259–264.
- A Cruwys Morchard Notebook, 1066-1874. Exeter: J. Townsend & Sons, 1939.
- Records at Cruwys Morchard [presidential address], Trans. Dev. Assoc. 84, 1952, pp. 1–19.
- The Register of Baptisms, Marriages and Burials of the parish of St Andrew's Plymouth, Co. Devon, A.D. 1581-1618, with baptisms 1619-1633. Exeter: Devon and Cornwall Record Society, 1938–1954.
