= Juan-Carlos Cruz =

Dominican American chef

- Born: 1962 (age 63–64); Dominican Republic
- Citizenship: United States
- Education: California Culinary Academy 1993
- Occupation: Chef
- Years active: 1994–2010
- Criminal charges: Solicitation of murder
- Criminal penalty: No contest
- Criminal status: Incarcerated
- Spouse: Jennifer Campbell
- Culinary career
- Cooking style: Low calorie
- Television shows: Calorie Commando; Weighing In

Juan-Carlos Cruz (born ca. 1962) is a Dominican American chef and the former host of Calorie Commando and Weighing In on the Food Network. Cruz lost 43 pounds on the Discovery Health Channel show Discovery Health Body Challenge, which encouraged him to change directions from being a pastry chef to do low-calorie cooking. In 2010, Cruz was sentenced to prison for nine years in California for soliciting homeless people to murder his wife, Jennifer Campbell.

== Early life and education ==
Juan-Carlos Cruz was born around 1962 in the Dominican Republic. He has two older brothers. He moved to the United States with his family when he was three, settling in California. He learned how to cook watching Graham Kerr, Jeff Smith, and Julia Child on television.

Cruz graduated in 1993 from the California Culinary Academy with a focus on pastry and found work in Los Angeles.

== Career ==
After graduation from the Culinary Academy in 1993, Cruz joined Hotel Bel Air as a pastry sous-chef. While at the Bel Air he created pastries for celebrities such as Jack Nicholson, Oprah Winfrey and Julia Roberts.

Cruz struggled with weight gain due to his work with pastries. In 2000, he appeared on the Discovery Health Channel program "Discovery Health Body Challenge" and lost 43 pounds. He called himself the "Calorie Commando" and began focusing on low calorie cooking. In 2004, he began starring in the Food Network show named after his nickname, "Calorie Commando." The following year, 2005, he began hosting Food Network's "Weighing In." As a result, he published a cookbook, "The Juan-Carlos Cruz Calorie Countdown Cookbook," in 2006.

== Personal life ==
Cruz was married to Jennifer Campbell, who he met in high school.

=== Legal issues ===
On Thursday, May 13, 2010, Cruz was arrested in Los Angeles, CA at Cheviot Hills Park on suspicion of murder for hire after three homeless individuals reported Cruz soliciting them to kill his wife, Jennifer Campbell. Cruz had asked the men to slit Campbell's throat or to strangle her for $1,000 and gave one of the men, Big Dave, the security code to Cruz's apartment so he could kill Campbell. He was held on a $5 million bail, which was eventually lowered to $2 million.

Cruz's motivation to have Campbell killed stemmed from the couple's struggle to have a child due to fertility issues. The couple spent over $200,000 on fertility treatments, resulting in Campbell struggling with depression. Cruz believed having Campbell killed would be a "merciful" way to help her end her life. Cruz was charged with murder for hire and attempted murder. On December 13, 2010, Cruz pleaded "no contest" to murder for hire and the attempted murder count was dropped. As a result of a plea agreement, Cruz was ordered to pay $1,870 in restitution and to serve nine years in prison.

== Works by Juan-Carlos Cruz ==
- with Martha Rose Shulman. The Juan-Carlos Cruz Calorie Countdown Cookbook: A 5-Week Eating Strategy for Sustainable Weight. New York: Gotham Publishing (2006). ISBN 1592402585
