= Cruz family (Philippines) =

Filipino family of entertainers

The Cruz family is a Filipino family of entertainers.

== List of members ==
1. Tirso Cruz Sr.
  1. ∞ married Unknown
    1. Cesar Cruz, Sr.
      1. ∞ married Milagros Velez; they had three children: Ricky, Beth and Danny.
        1. Ricky Belmonte
          1. ∞ married Rosemarie Sonora, they had three children: Renzo, Sheryl and Patrick.
            1. Sheryl Cruz
            2. Renzo Cruz
        2. Beth Cruz
          1. ∞ married Rodolfo L. Ilustre, they had three children: Rayver, Rodjun and Omat.
            1. Rodjun Cruz
              1. ∞ married Dianne Medina
            2. Rayver Cruz
        3. Danny Cruz
          1. with Unknown, they had four children, Sunshine, Maritess, Michael and Maricel.
            1. Sunshine Cruz
              1. ∞ married Cesar Montano (annulled), they have three daughters: Angelina, Samantha, Cheska.
    2. Tirso Bailey Cruz Jr.
      1. ∞ married Elma Acosta Silvano; they had three children
        1. Tirso Cruz III
          1. ∞ married Erlinda Ynchausti, they had three children: TJ, Bodie and Djanin.
            1. TJ Cruz
            2. Bodie Cruz
            3. Djanin Cruz
    3. Father
      1. ∞ married Unknown
        1. Boyet Cruz
          1. ∞ married Unknown, they had three children: Geneva, Aubrey, Vannessa, and EJ.
            1. Geneva Cruz
              1. with Paco Arespacochaga, had one son: Heaven.
        2. Yolly
          1. ∞ married Unknown, they have two children: Donna and Jomar.
            1. Donna Cruz
              1. ∞ married Yong Larrazabal, they have three children.
