= Kroos =

Kroos is a surname. Notable people with the surname include:

- Felix Kroos (born 1991), German footballer, younger brother of Toni
- Toni Kroos (born 1990), German footballer, older brother of Felix

== See also ==
- Kroos (film), a documentary about Toni Kroos
