= Kru =

Kru, KRU may refer to:

- Kanchanaburi Rajabhat University (KRU)
- Kru people, ethnic group in Liberia and Côte d'Ivoire
- Kru languages, the group of dialects spoken by the Kru of Liberia and Côte d'Ivoire
- KRU, Malaysian boy band
- KRU Interactive, a gaming company
- Kru, a fictional character in the film Chang: A Drama of the Wilderness
- Korea Rugby Union
- Kuzbassrazrezugol, a Russian coal-mining company.
- Kids "R" Us, defunct subdivision of Toys "R" Us that operated from 1983 to 2004
