= Kruse =

Kruse is a surname. It may refer to:

- Anine Kruse (born 1977), Norwegian music conductor
- Anja Kruse (born 1956), German actress
- August von Kruse (1779–1848), German general during the Napoleonic Wars
- Frank Kruse, German sound engineer
- Frederik Vinding Kruse (1880–1963), Danish jurist
- George Kruse (1880–1965), Australian footballer
- Kai Kruse (born 1991), German former cyclist and rower
- Käthe Kruse (1883–1968), German dollmaker
- Kevin M. Kruse, American historian
- Line Damkjær Kruse (born 1988), Danish basketball player
- Line Kruse (actress) (born 1975), Danish actress
- Line Kruse, a composer and violinist based who played on albums by Gotan Project, including Lunático
- Lowen Kruse (1929–2017), American politician from Nebraska
- Max Kruse, several people
- Michael Kruse (judge) (born 1948), chief justice of the High Court of American Samoa
- Michael Kruse (politician) (born 1983), German politician
- Robbie Kruse (born 1988), Australian footballer
- Rüdiger Kruse (born 1961), German politician
- Sigrid Kruse (1867–1950), Swedish educator, children's writer and suffragist
- Tom Kruse (inventor), inventor of the Hoveround, a type of electric wheelchair
- Tom Kruse (mailman) (1914–2011), Australian mailman, featured in documentary The Back of Beyond
- William F. Kruse (1894–1952), American socialist journalist and functionary
- Wulf Traugott Kruse (1936–2025), German politician
