= Tabanera =

Tabanera may refer to:

- Tabanera de Cerrato, municipality located in the province of Palencia, Castile and León, Spain
- Tabanera de Valdavia, municipality located in the province of Palencia, Castile and León, Spain
- Tabanera la Luenga, municipality located in the province of Segovia, Castile and León, Spain
