= Villavega =

Coordinates: 42°27′49″N 4°28′50″W

Villavega, Spain
- Interactive map of Villavega, Spain
- Country: Spain
- Autonomous community: Castile and León
- Province: Palencia
- Municipality: Villavega
- Time zone: UTC+1 (CET)
  - Summer (DST): UTC+2 (CEST)

Villavega is municipality located in the province of Palencia, Castile and León, Spain. It is placed in the confluence between two comarcas, Tierra de Campos and Vega-Valdavia. This little village is in the left side of the Valdavia river.

The village is built around its main road Calle Real, which comes from an extension of an old way that has its start in Santa Cruz de Boedo. In the last years, this village has grown thanks to a new piece of land which was said to be developable.

== Local economy ==
Agriculture and animal breeding.

== History ==
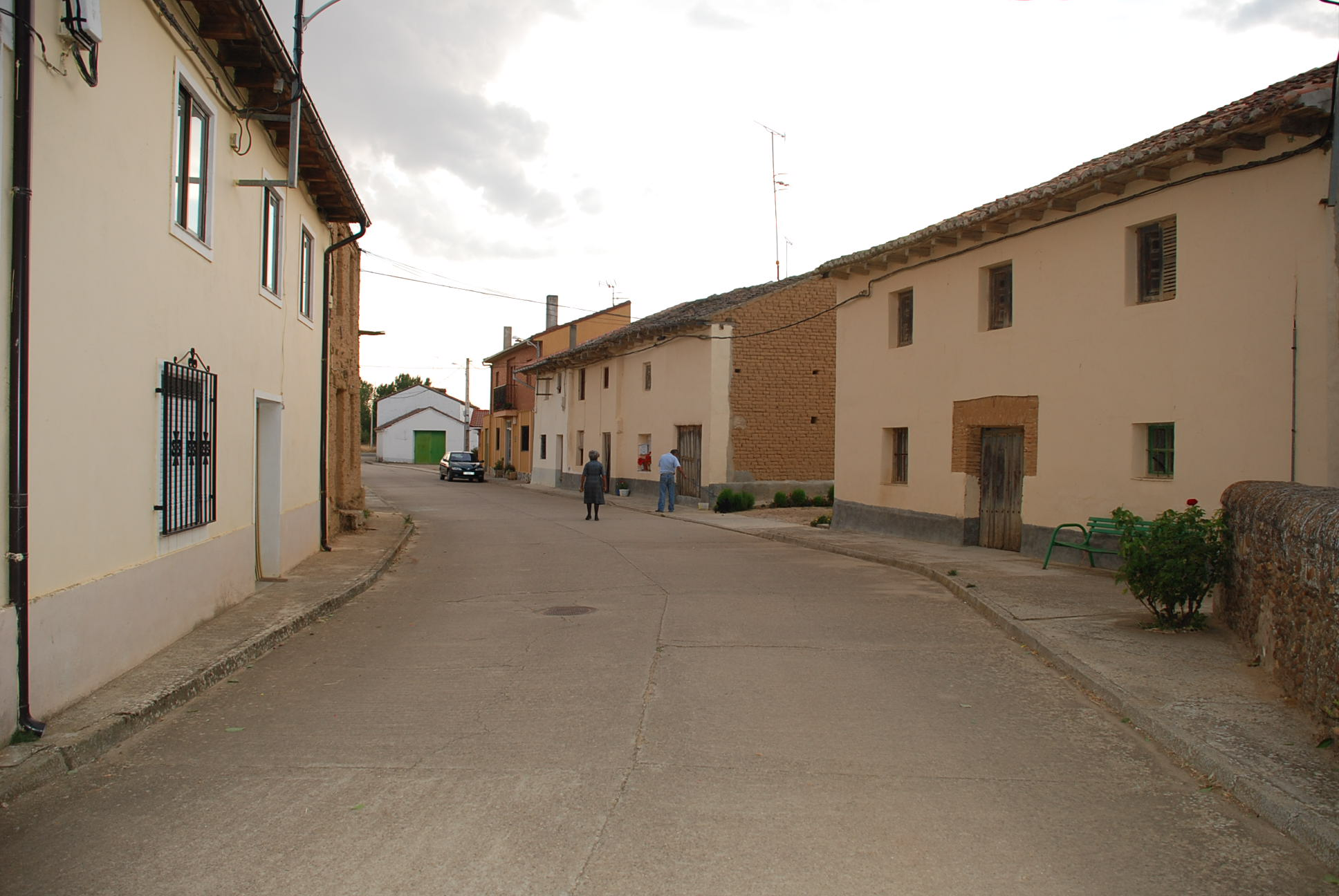
A general view of Calle Real in Villavega

Villavega was first named in an ancient quote of Castrillo de Villavega. It was named in Alfonso VIII´s last will, in 1204, about 300 years after the establishment of this monument when this monarch ordered the delivery of the castle to the institution named as Orden Militar de San Juan de Jerusalem also known as Orden del Hospital, which was in charge of the security in this area.

According to the historian Gonzalo Martínez Díez, during the Middle Ages Villavega belonged to Meryndat de Monçon. However, this information does not appear in the book Becerro de las Behetrías de Castilla.

== Patrimony ==
=== San Andres Apostol Church ===
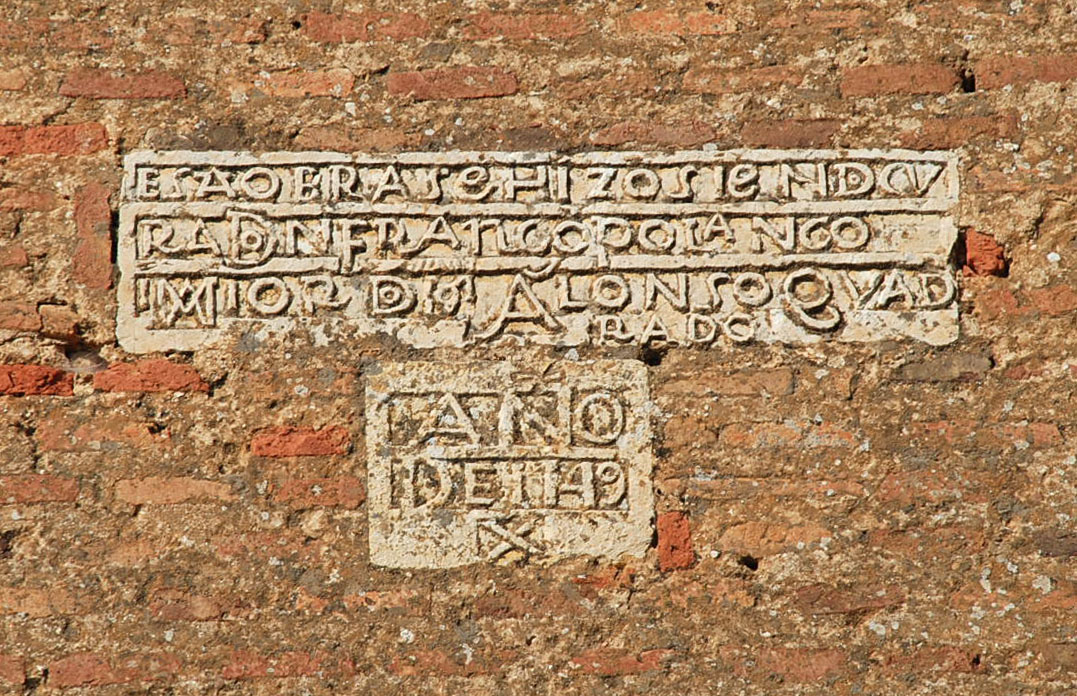
The headstone written when the church was built

The church is of Romanesque origin. In the front side of the church there is a picture of a head, sculpted in stone. There are also two little quotations sculpted in the stone. The first and the biggest one says:

ESTA OBRA SE HIZO SIENDO CURA DON FRANCISCO POLANCO MAYORDOMO ALONSO QUADRADO

And the little one below:

AÑO DE 1449

Although the outside shows a Renaissance style, the inside is in a Romanesque style from the 12th and 13th centuries. There are two pictures from the 12th and 13th centuries. One of the pictures shows Santa Bárbara and the other San Sebastián. These pictures and some silver objects were removed from the church in 1980. They were recovered some years later.

=== Osario deciochesco ===
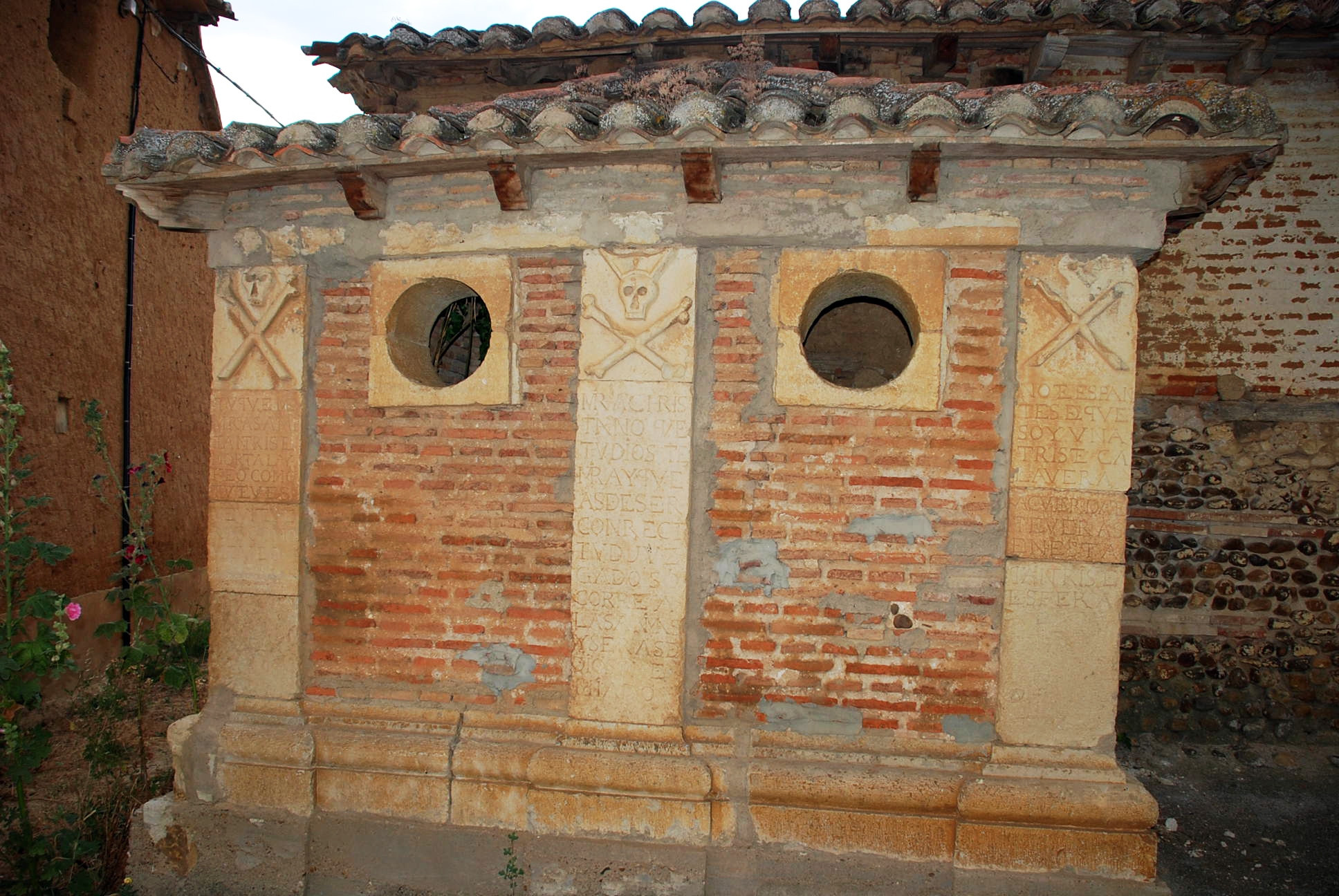
The ossuary of the San Andres Apostol church in Villavega

It is placed outside the church. It is just a building with three pillars and decorated with skulls and inscriptions talking about how short life is. Between each pillar there is a hole which gives access to the inside part of the ossuary. Beginning from the left side, the inscriptions say:

TV QVE ME MIRAS A MI TAN TRISTE MORTAL Y FEO COMO TV TE VES ME VI TE VERAS COMO ME VEO

MIRA CHRISTIANO QVE TV DIOS TE MIRA Y QVE AS DE SER CON RECTITVD JVZGADO SOCORRE A LAS ANIMAS Y SERAS DE DIOS PREMIADO

NO TE ESPANTES DE QVE SOY VNA TRISTE CALAVERA ACVERDATE TE VERAS EN ESTA TAN TRISTE ESFERA

== Image gallery ==
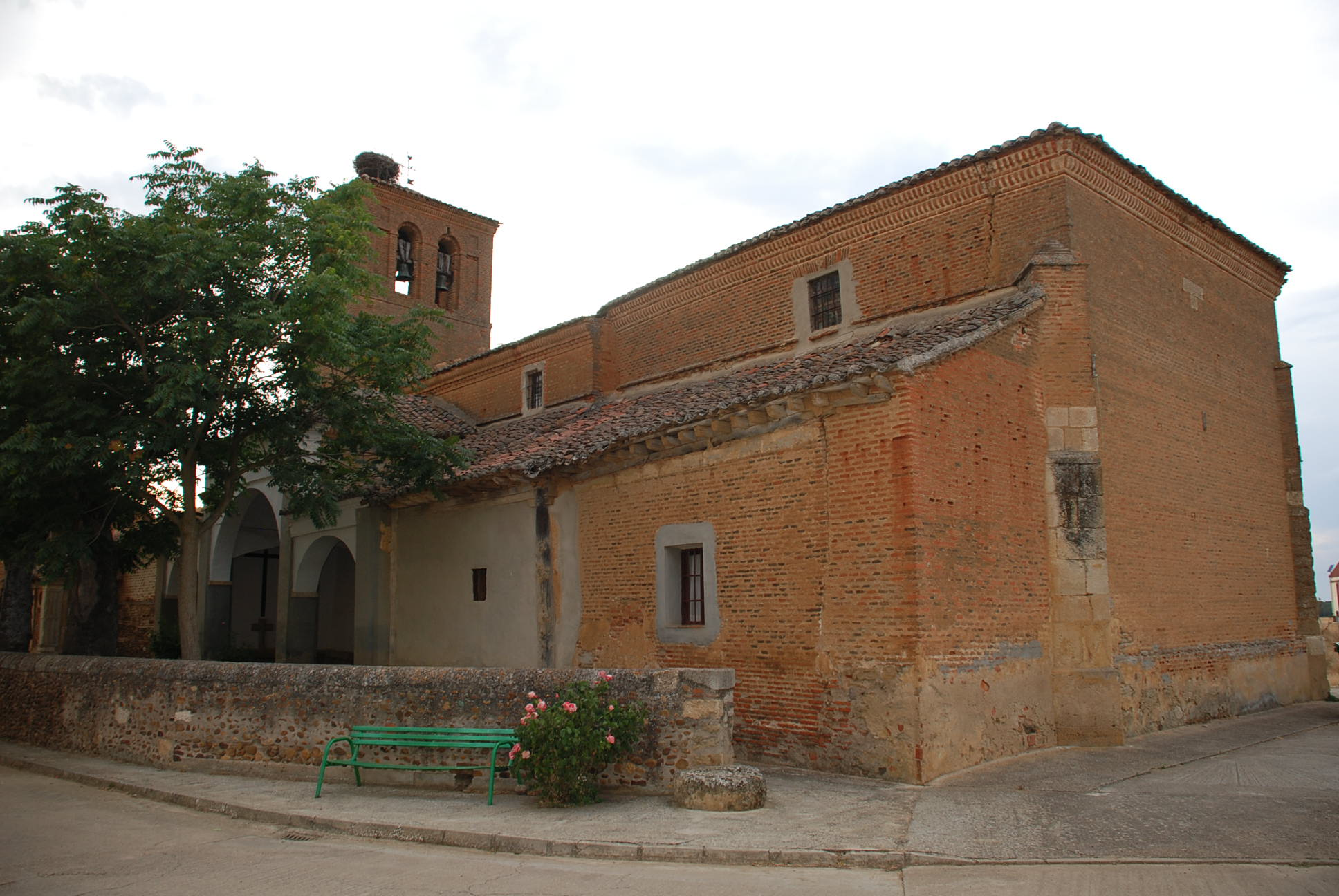
View of the frontside of the San Andres Apostol church

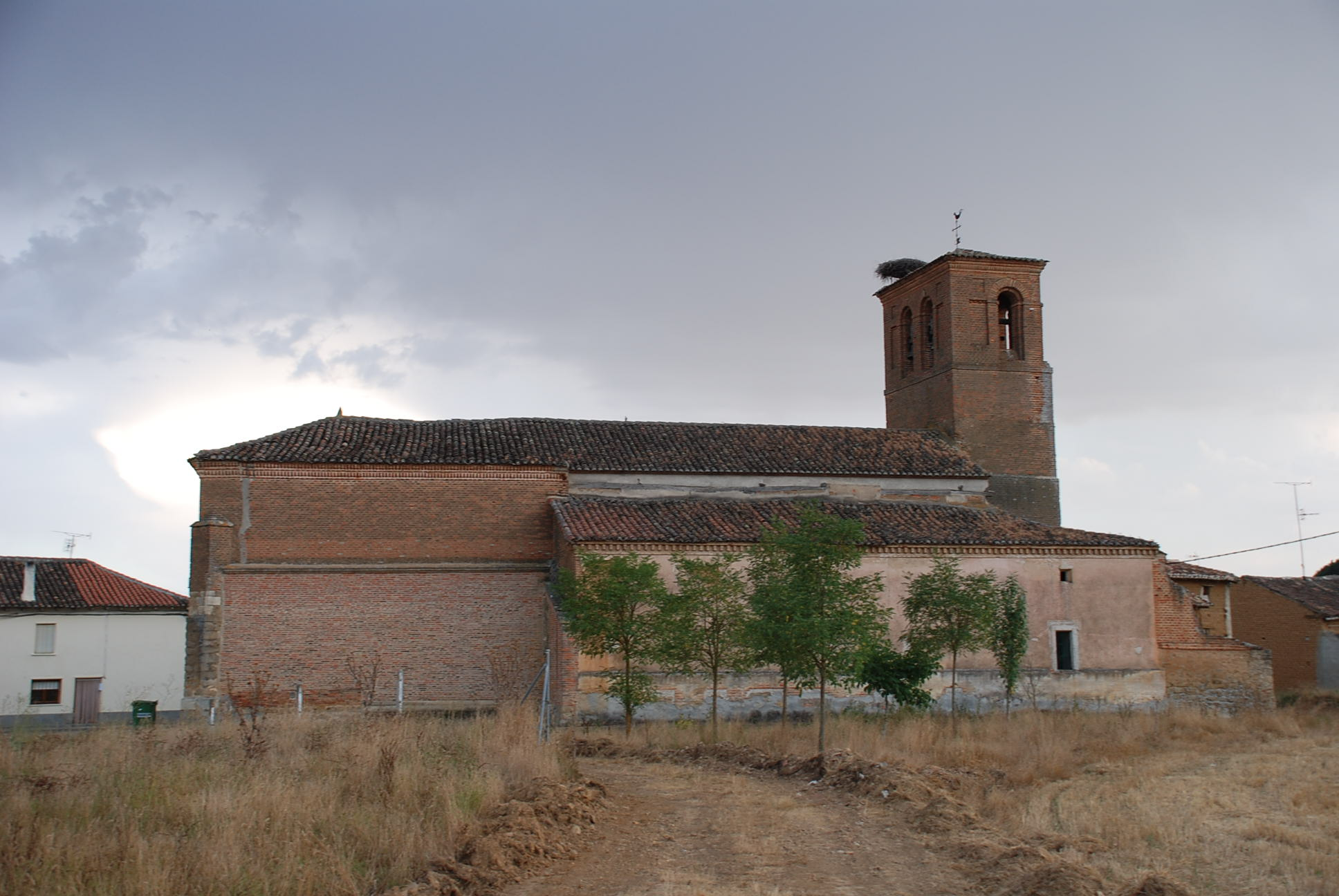
View of the northside of the San Andres Apostol church

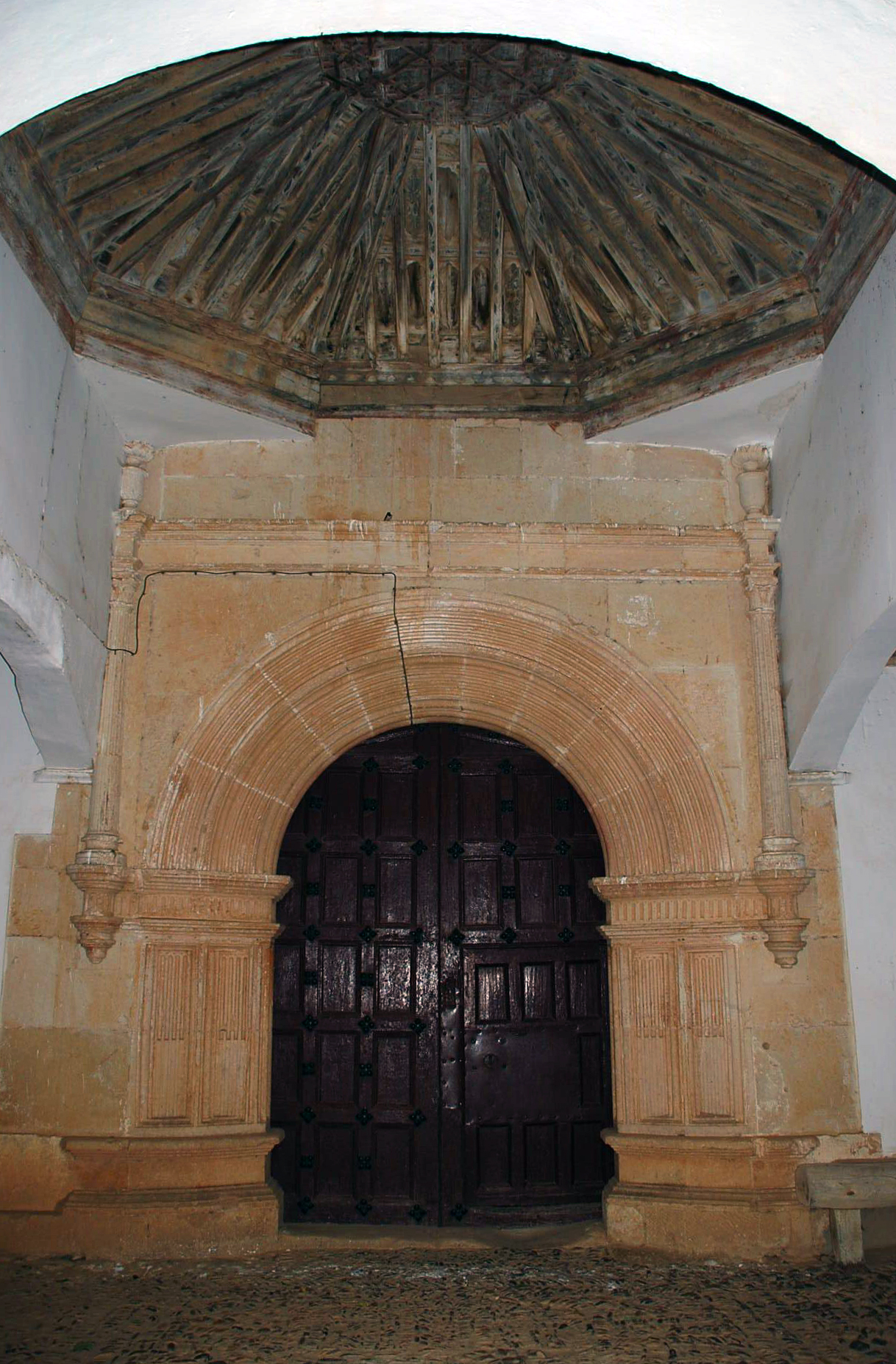
Example of the renaissance style of the san Andres Apostol church

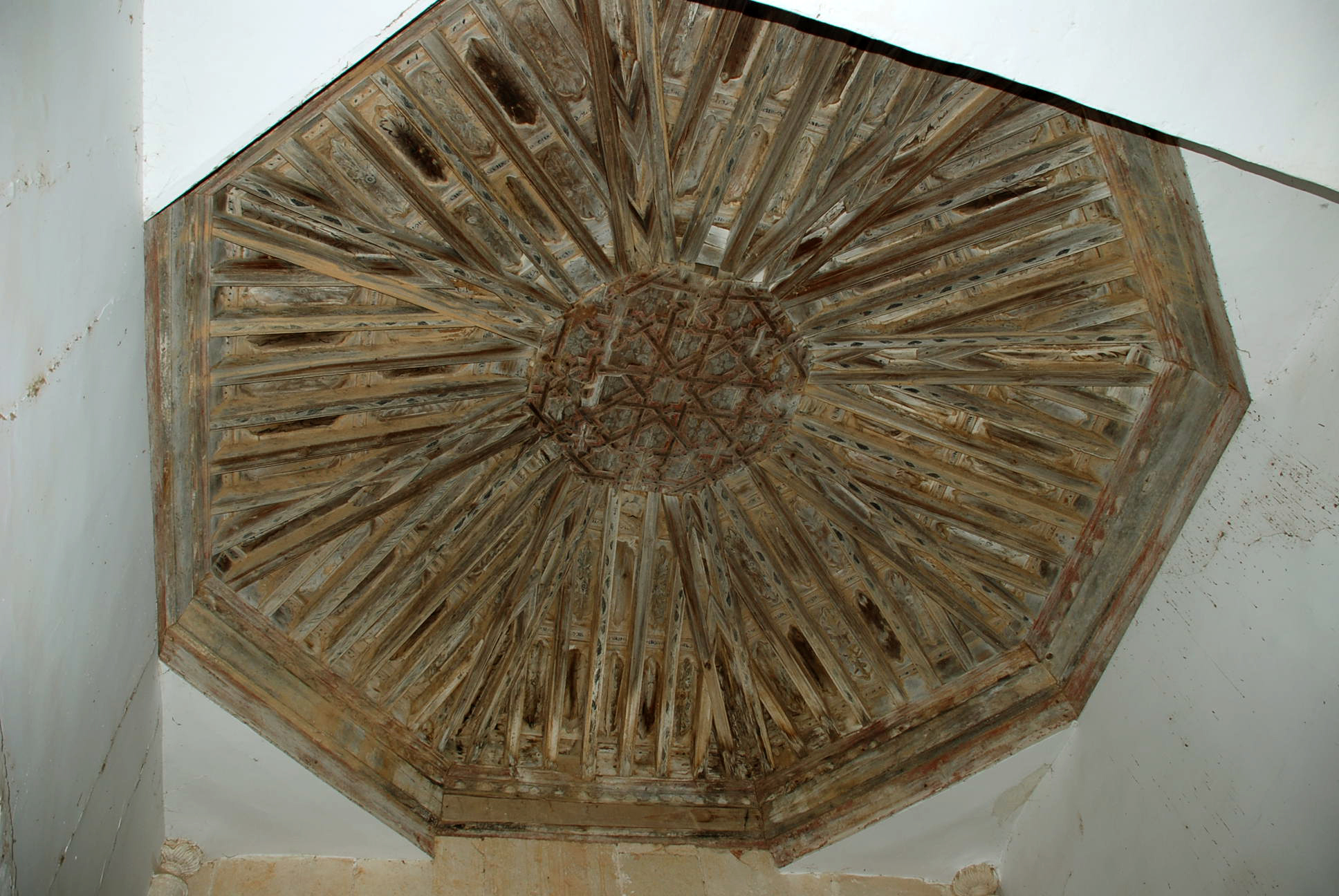
Detailed view of the dome of the San Andres Apostol church

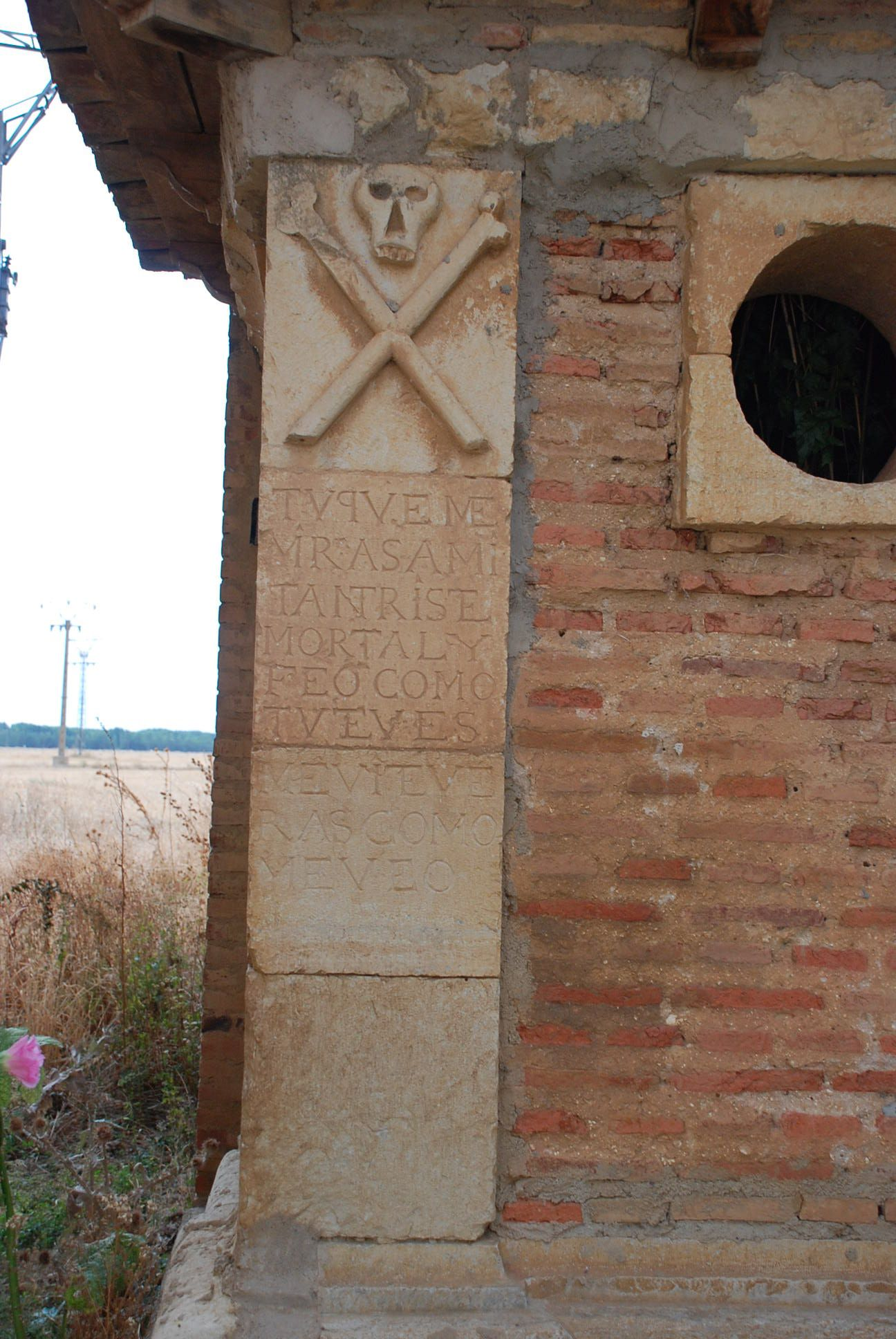
Detailed view of the first pillar of the ossuary: "TV QVE ME MIRAS A MI TAN TRISTE MORTAL Y FEO COMO TV TE VES ME VI TE VERAS COMO ME VEO"

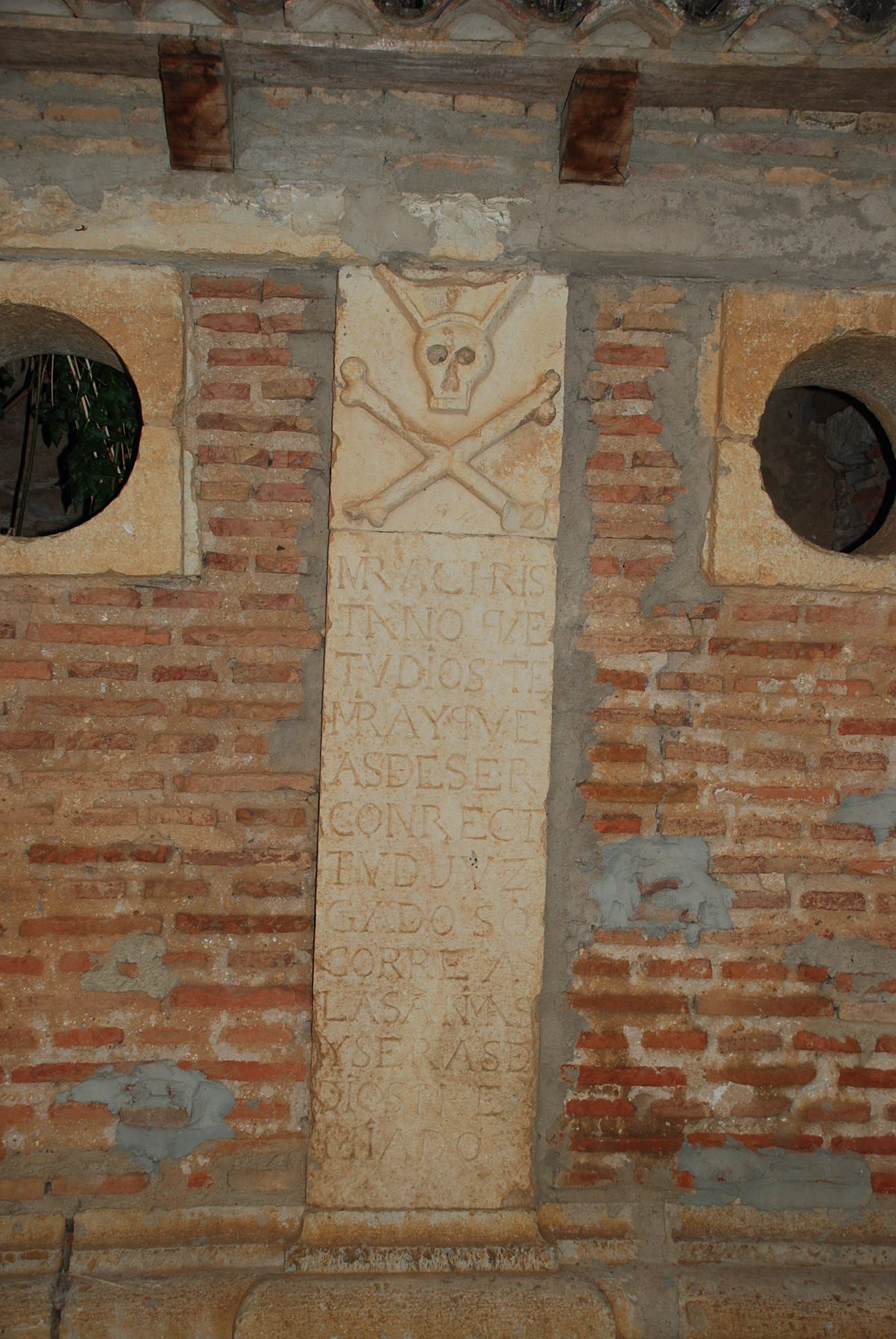
Detailed view of the second pillar of the ossuary: "MIRA CHRISTIANO QVE TV DIOS TE MIRA Y QVE AS DE SER CON RECTITVD JVZGADO SOCORRE A LAS ANIMAS Y SERAS DE DIOS PREMIADO"

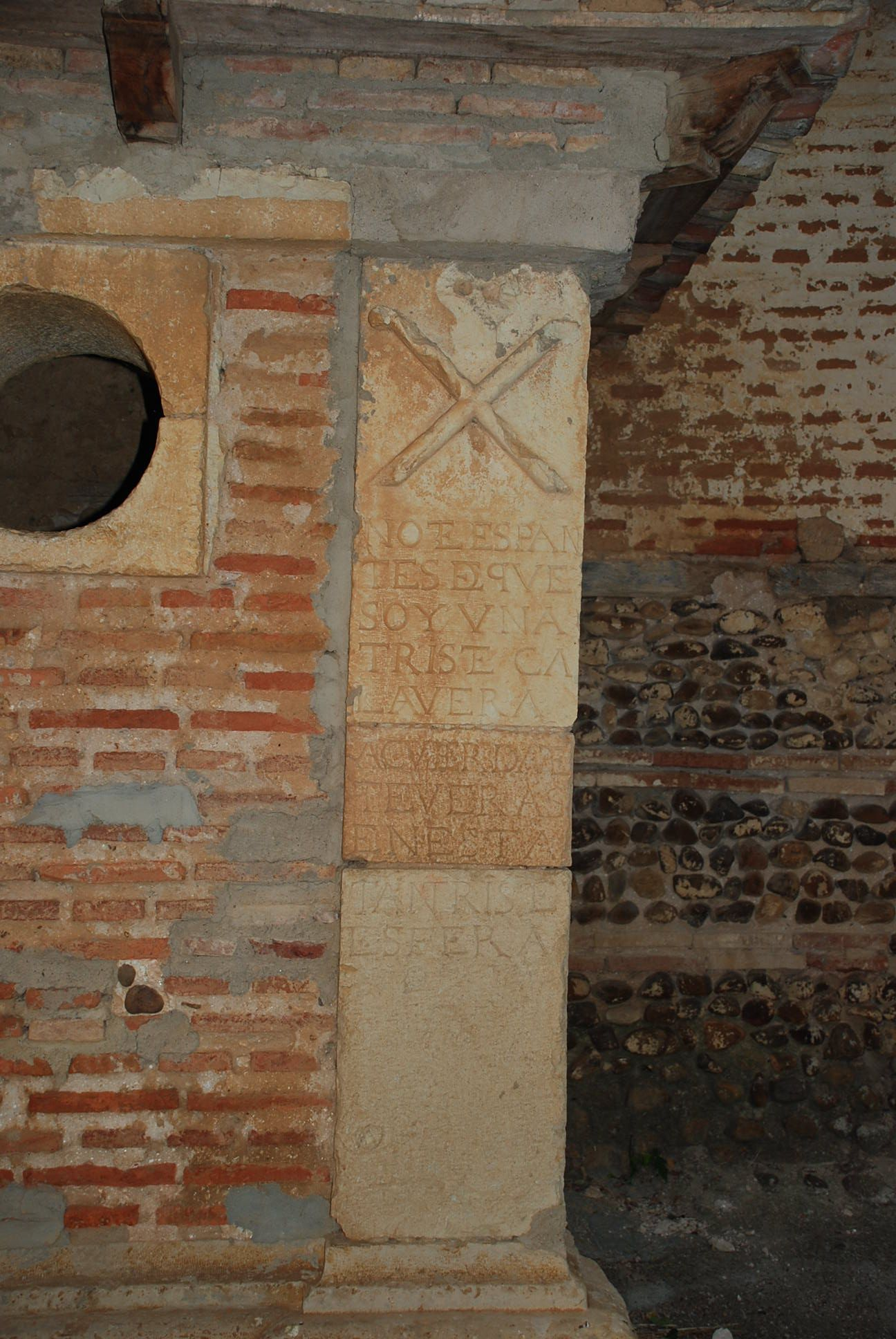
Detailed view of the third pillar of the ossuary: "NO TE ESPANTES DE QVE SOY VNA TRISTE CALAVERA ACVERDATE TE VERAS EN ESTA TAN TRISTE ESFERA"
