= Autilla del Pino =

Coordinates: 41°59′N 4°38′W

- municipality
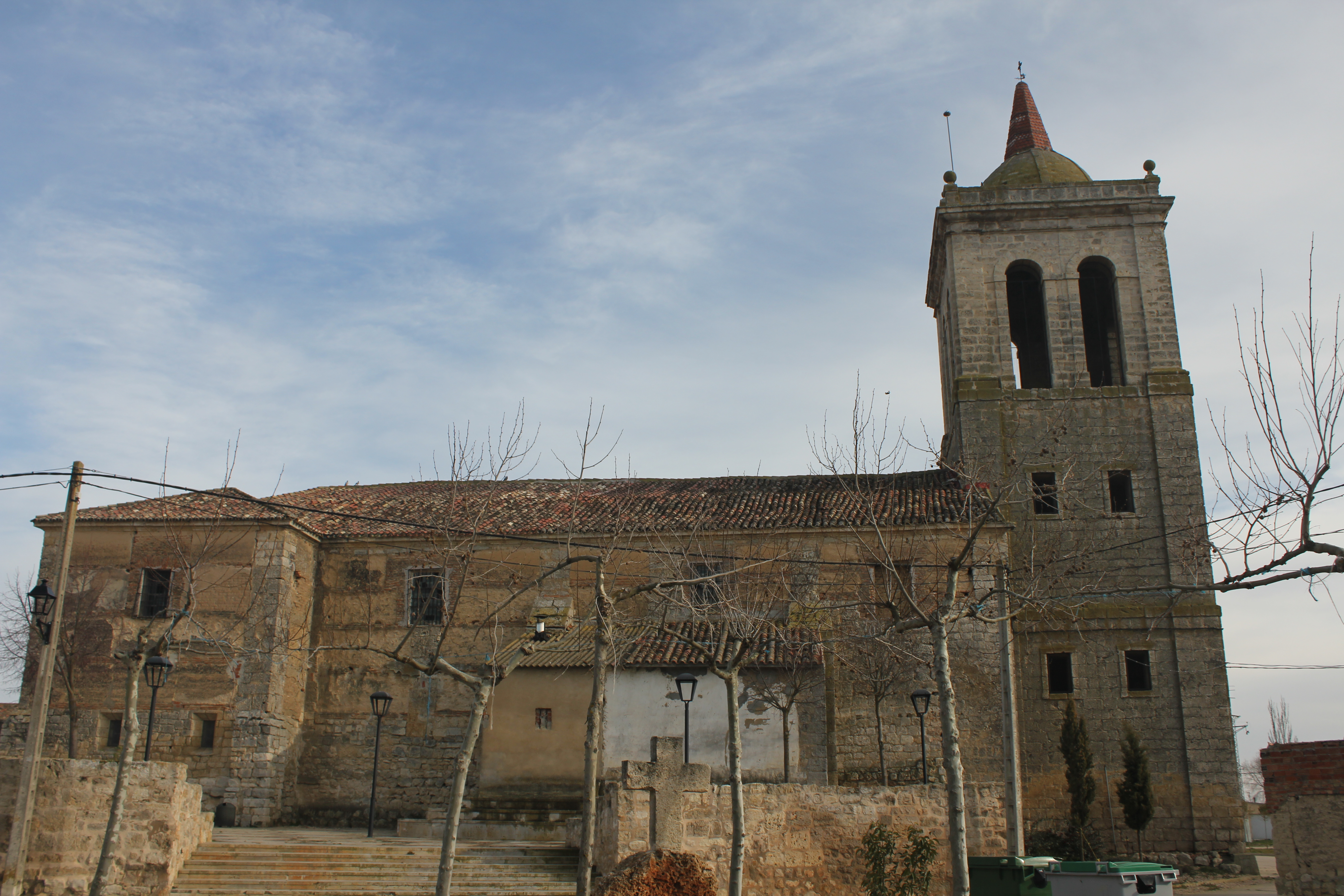

- Flag Coat of arms
- Interactive map of Autilla del Pino
- Country: Spain
- Autonomous community: Castile and León
- Province: Palencia
- Municipality: Autilla del Pino

Area
  - Total: 34 km^{2} (13 sq mi)

Population (2025-01-01)
  - Total: 223
  - Density: 6.6/km^{2} (17/sq mi)
- Time zone: UTC+1 (CET)
  - Summer (DST): UTC+2 (CEST)

Autilla del Pino is a municipality located in the province of Palencia, Castile and León, Spain.

According to the 2004 census (INE), the municipality had a population of 243 inhabitants.
