= Tabanera de Valdavia =

Coordinates: 42°39′N 4°41′W

- municipality
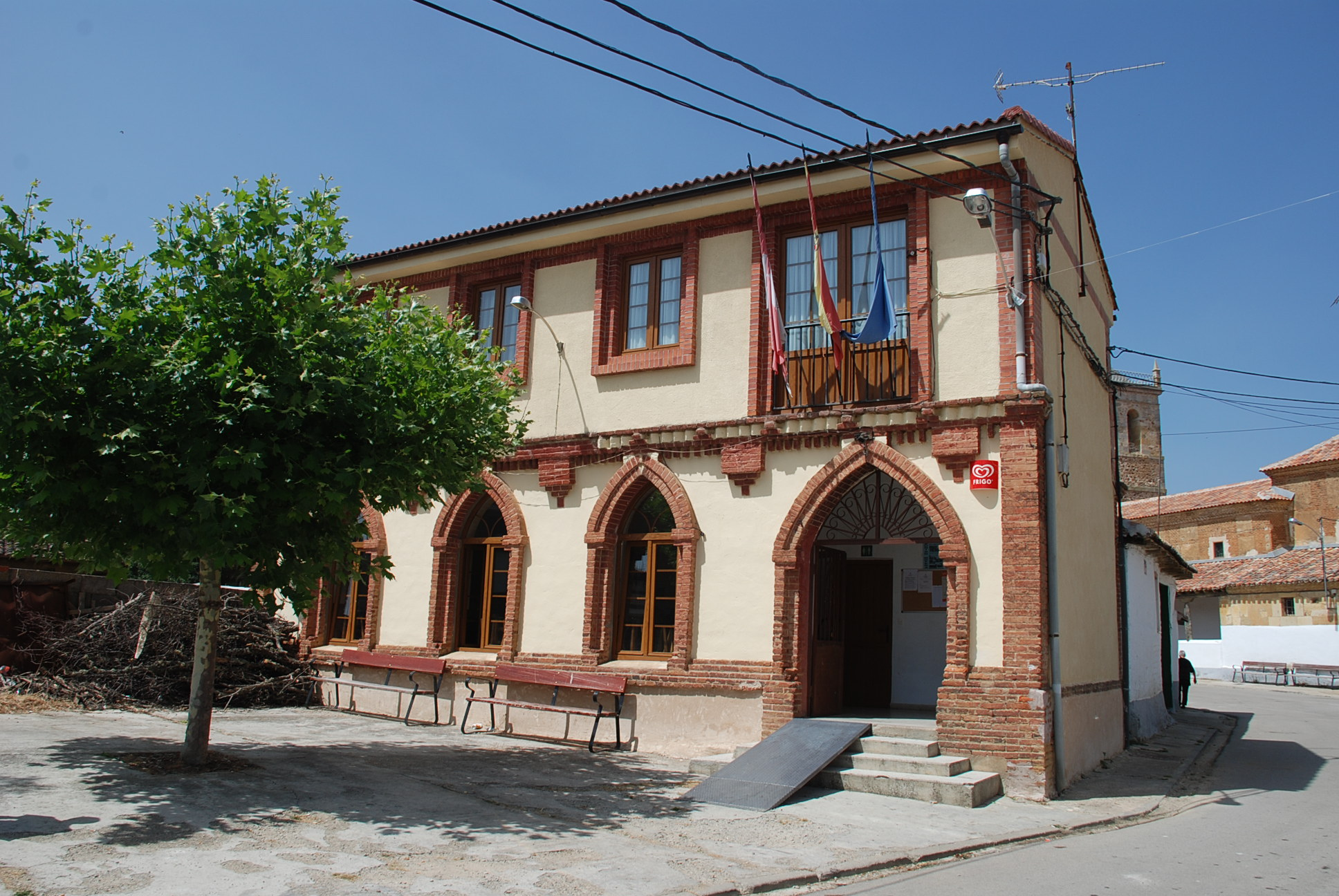
- Interactive map of Tabanera de Valdavia
- Country: Spain
- Autonomous community: Castile and León
- Province: Palencia
- Municipality: Tabanera de Valdavia

Area
  - Total: 21 km^{2} (8.1 sq mi)

Population (2025-01-01)
  - Total: 20
  - Density: 0.95/km^{2} (2.5/sq mi)
- Time zone: UTC+1 (CET)
  - Summer (DST): UTC+2 (CEST)
- Website: Official website

Tabanera de Valdavia is a municipality located in the province of Palencia, Castile and León, Spain. According to the 2004 census (INE), the municipality had a population of 48 inhabitants. By 2018, the population had dropped to 25 people.
