= Tabanera de Cerrato =

Coordinates: 42°01′N 4°07′W

- municipality
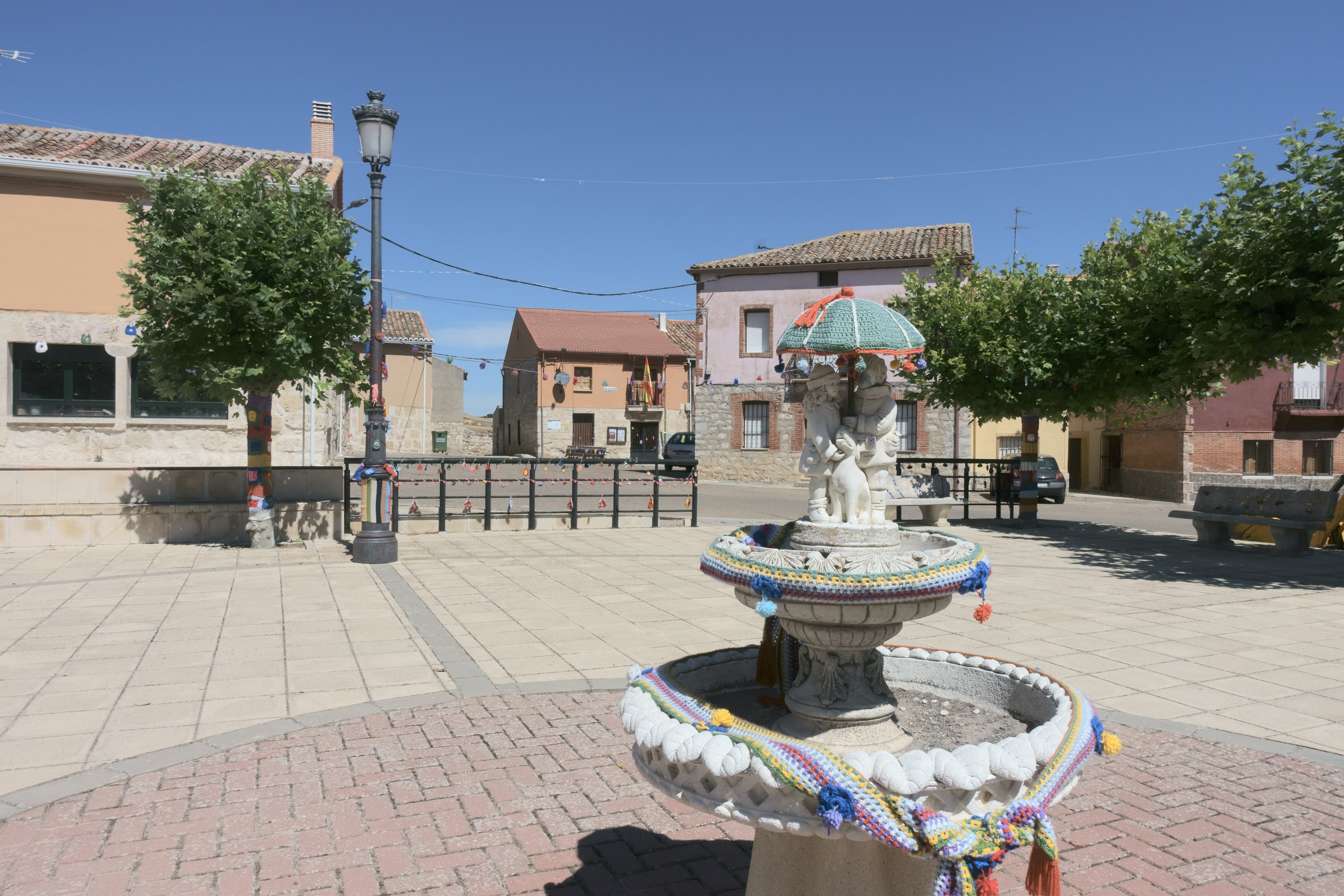

- Flag Coat of arms
- Interactive map of Tabanera de Cerrato
- Country: Spain
- Autonomous community: Castile and León
- Province: Palencia
- Municipality: Tabanera de Cerrato

Area
  - Total: 46.34 km^{2} (17.89 sq mi)
- Elevation: 840 m (2,760 ft)

Population (2025-01-01)
  - Total: 133
  - Density: 2.87/km^{2} (7.43/sq mi)
- Time zone: UTC+1 (CET)
  - Summer (DST): UTC+2 (CEST)
- Website: Official website

Tabanera de Cerrato is a municipality located in the province of Palencia, Castile and León, Spain. According to the 2013 census (INE), the municipality had a population of 121 inhabitants.
