= Santa Cruz de Boedo =

Coordinates: 42°32′N 4°22′W

- municipality
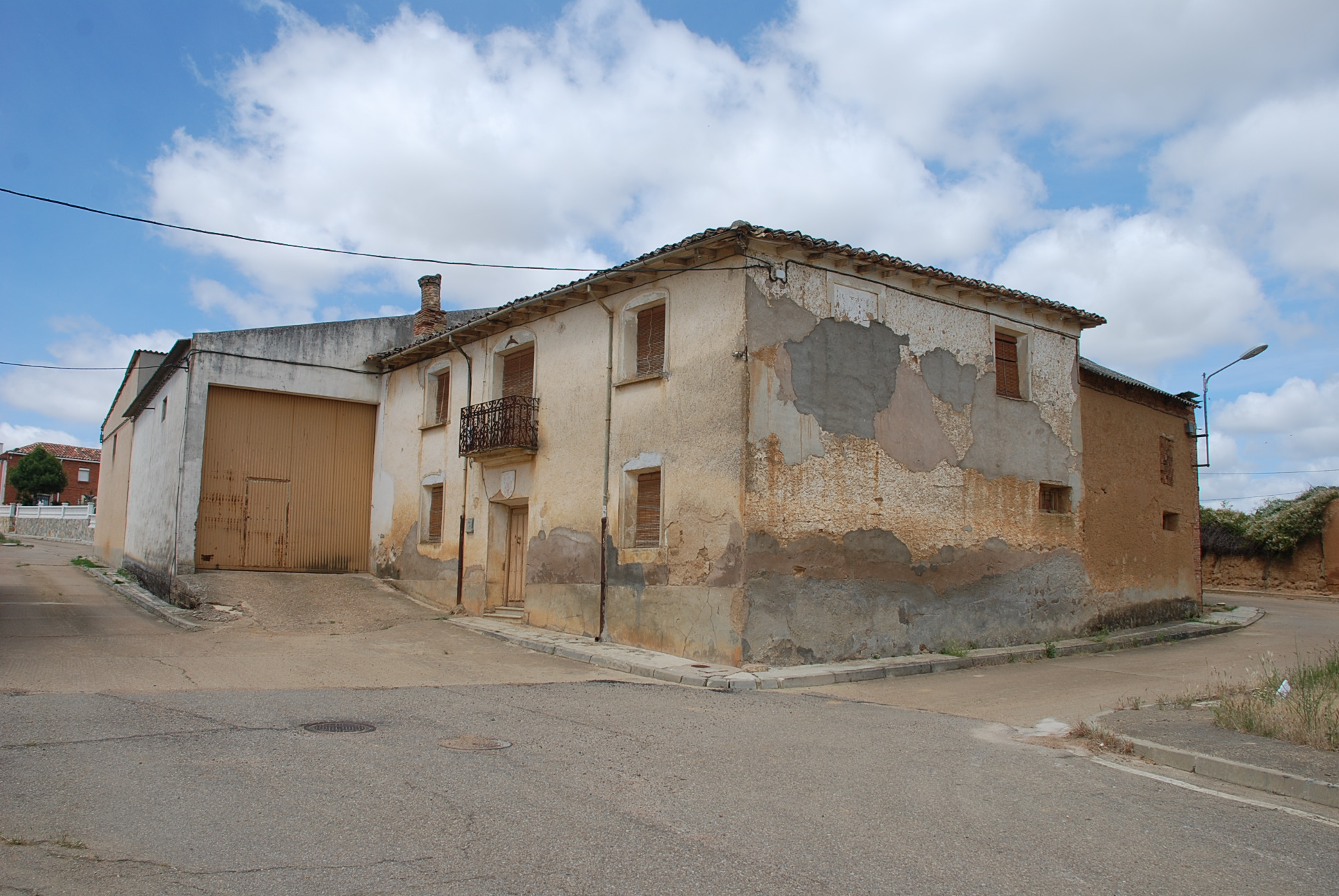
- Interactive map of Santa Cruz de Boedo
- Country: Spain
- Autonomous community: Castile and León
- Province: Palencia
- Municipality: Santa Cruz de Boedo

Area
  - Total: 25 km^{2} (9.7 sq mi)

Population (2025-01-01)
  - Total: 51
  - Density: 2.0/km^{2} (5.3/sq mi)
- Time zone: UTC+1 (CET)
  - Summer (DST): UTC+2 (CEST)
- Website: Official website

Santa Cruz de Boedo is a municipality located in the province of Palencia, Castile and León, Spain. According to the 2004 census (INE), the municipality has a population of 52 inhabitants.
